= Longju Road station =

Metro station in Shanghai, China

Longju Road 龙居路

General information
- Location: Longju Road and Pudong Avenue, Pudong, Shanghai; China
- Coordinates: 31.259098°N 121.553972°E
- Line: Line 14
- Platforms: 2 (1 island platform)
- Tracks: 2

Construction
- Structure type: Underground
- Accessible: Yes

Other information
- Status: Pending

History
- Opening: To be determined

Services
Preceding station	Shanghai Metro	Following station
Xiepu Road towards Fengbang	Line 14	Yunshan Road towards Guiqiao Road
Location

Longju Road (Chinese: 龙居路) is a reserved station on the Line 14 of the Shanghai Metro. Located at the intersection of Longju Road and Pudong Avenue in Pudong, the station is expected to open after the rest of Line 14 due to difficulties in land acquisition.
