= Changshou Road Subdistrict =

Coordinates: 31.2413°N 121.4296°E

Changshou Road Subdistrict 长寿路街道
- Subdistrict
- Interactive map of Changshou Road Subdistrict
- Country: People's Republic of China
- Municipality: Shanghai
- District: Putuo
- Merger of Jiaozhou Road Subdistrict and Putuo Road Subdistricts: 23 October 1991
- Incorporation of sections of Baiyu Subdistrict, Shiquan Subdistrict and Dongxin Subdistrict: April 2004
- Named for: Changshou Road

Area
  - Total: 3.98 km^{2} (1.54 sq mi)

Population (2010)
  - Total: 128,647
  - Density: 32,300/km^{2} (83,700/sq mi)
- Time zone: UTC+8 (China Standard)
- Postal Code: 200060
- Guobiao administrative code: 310107015
- Website: http://csjd.shpt.gov.cn/website/pages/index.html

Changshou Road Subdistrict (simplified Chinese: 长寿路街道; traditional Chinese: 長壽路街道; pinyin: Chángshòu Lù Jiēdào; lit. 'Longevity Road Subdistrict') is a subdistrict on the southern side of Putuo District, Shanghai. The subdistrict was formed on 23 October 1991 from the merger of Jiaozhou Road Subdistrict and Putuo Road Subdistrict and was expanded in April 2004 when parts of Baiyu Subdistrict, Shiquan Subdistrict and Dongxin Subdistrict during an area adjustment of Putuo District. There are 31 village-level divisions within Changshou Road Subdistrict.

Changshou Road Subdistrict is named for Changshou Road, a major road artery in the area.

The area is bounded by Suzhou Creek to the east, Caoyang Road and a small section of Wanhangdu Road to the west, the Inner Ring Road from the west passing along to Guangfu Road to the north and the western section of Changshou Road from the eastern end of Changning Road until it crosses over to Anyuan Road and meets Suzhou Creek to the south. To the west and the north, the area borders Changfeng Xincun Subdistrict, Caoyang Xincun Subdistrict, Shiquan Road Subdistrict and Yichuan Road Subdistrict. To the south of the Wanhangdu Road boundary, Changshou Road Subdistrict meets Changning District. To the east and south the subdistrict borders Jing'an District. It is the only subdistrict whose boundaries are across Suzhou Creek.

== History ==
The area around the current day Changshou Road Subdistrict had historically been the socially and economically developed area of Putuo District.

== Transportation ==
=== Metro ===
Changshou Road Subdistrict is currently served by five metro lines operated by Shanghai Metro:

- Line 3 and Line 4 - Caoyang Road Station 11 , Zhenping Road Station 7 .
- Line 7 - Zhenping Road Station 3 4 , Changshou Road Station 13 .
- Line 11 - Caoyang Road Station 3 4 , Longde Road Station 13 .
- Line 13 - Longde Road Station 11 , Wuning Road Station, Changshou Road Station 7 , Jiangning Road Station.

Changshou Road Subdistrict is to be served by Line 14 in the future.

=== Roads ===
==== Major arteries ====
- Jiangning Road
- Wuning Road
- Caoyang Road
- North Zhongshan Road
- Inner Ring Road
