= Pudong Football Stadium station =

Metro station in Shanghai, China

Pudong Football Stadium 浦东足球场
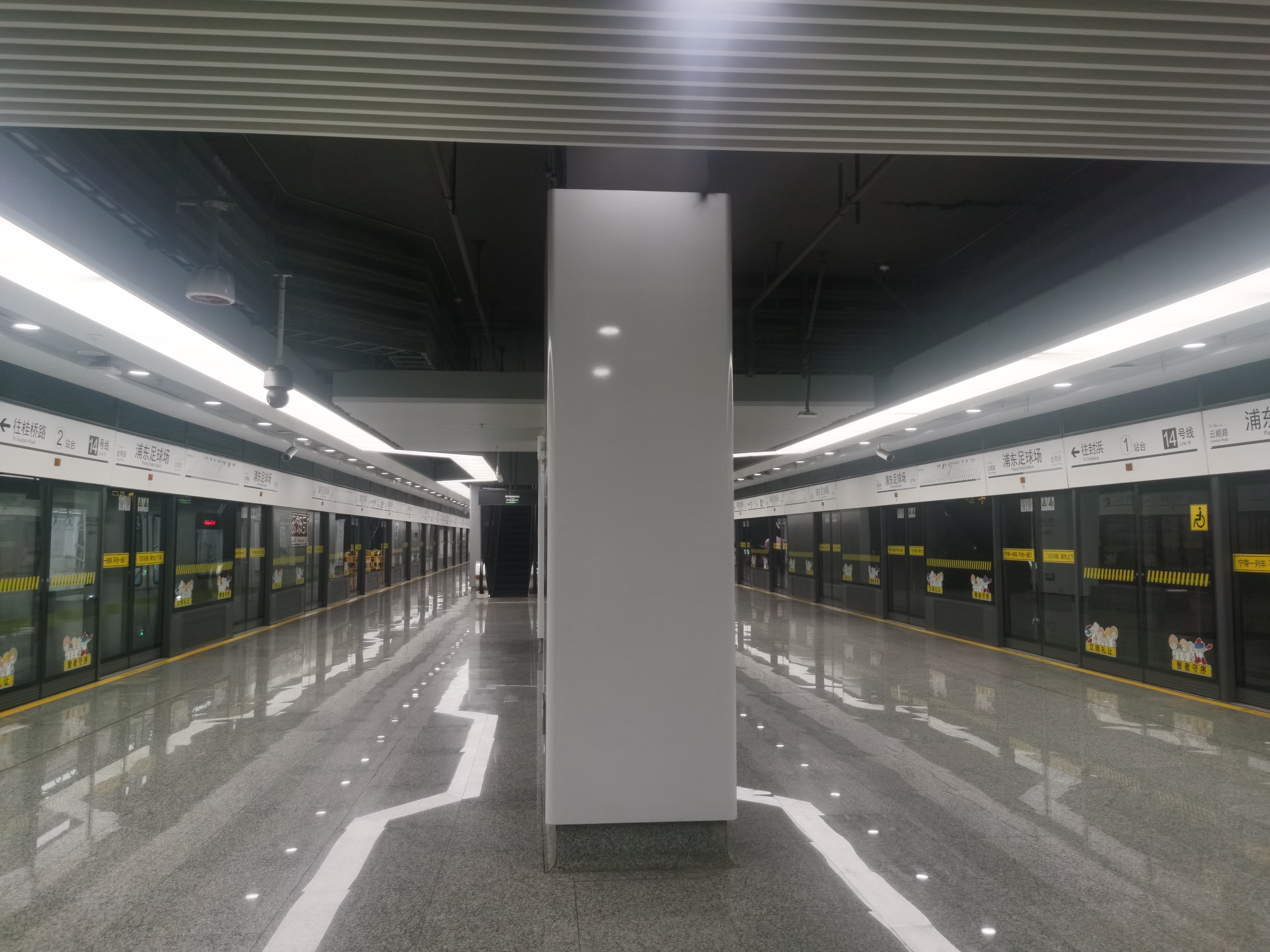
- Platform

General information
- Location: Jingang Road and East Jinxiu Road, Pudong, Shanghai; China
- Coordinates: 31.243731°N 121.610720°E
- Line: Line 14
- Platforms: 2 (1 island platform)
- Tracks: 2

Construction
- Structure type: Underground
- Accessible: Yes

History
- Opened: 30 December 2021
- Previous names: Jingang Road

Services
| Preceding station | Shanghai Metro | Following station |
|---|---|---|
| Yunshun Road towards Fengbang | Line 14 | Jinyue Road towards Guiqiao Road |
Location

Pudong Football Stadium (simplified Chinese: 浦东足球场; traditional Chinese: 浦東足球場; pinyin: Pǔdōng Zúqiúchǎng), formerly known as Jingang Road (Chinese: 金港路; pinyin: Jīngǎng Lù) is a station that is part of Line 14 of the Shanghai Metro. Located at the intersection of Jingang Road and East Jinxiu Road in Pudong, the station opened with the rest of Line 14 on December 30, 2021. It is named after the nearby Pudong Football Stadium.
