= Caoyang Road station =

Shanghai Metro interchange station

Coordinates: 31°14′23″N 121°25′06″E

Caoyang Road 曹杨路
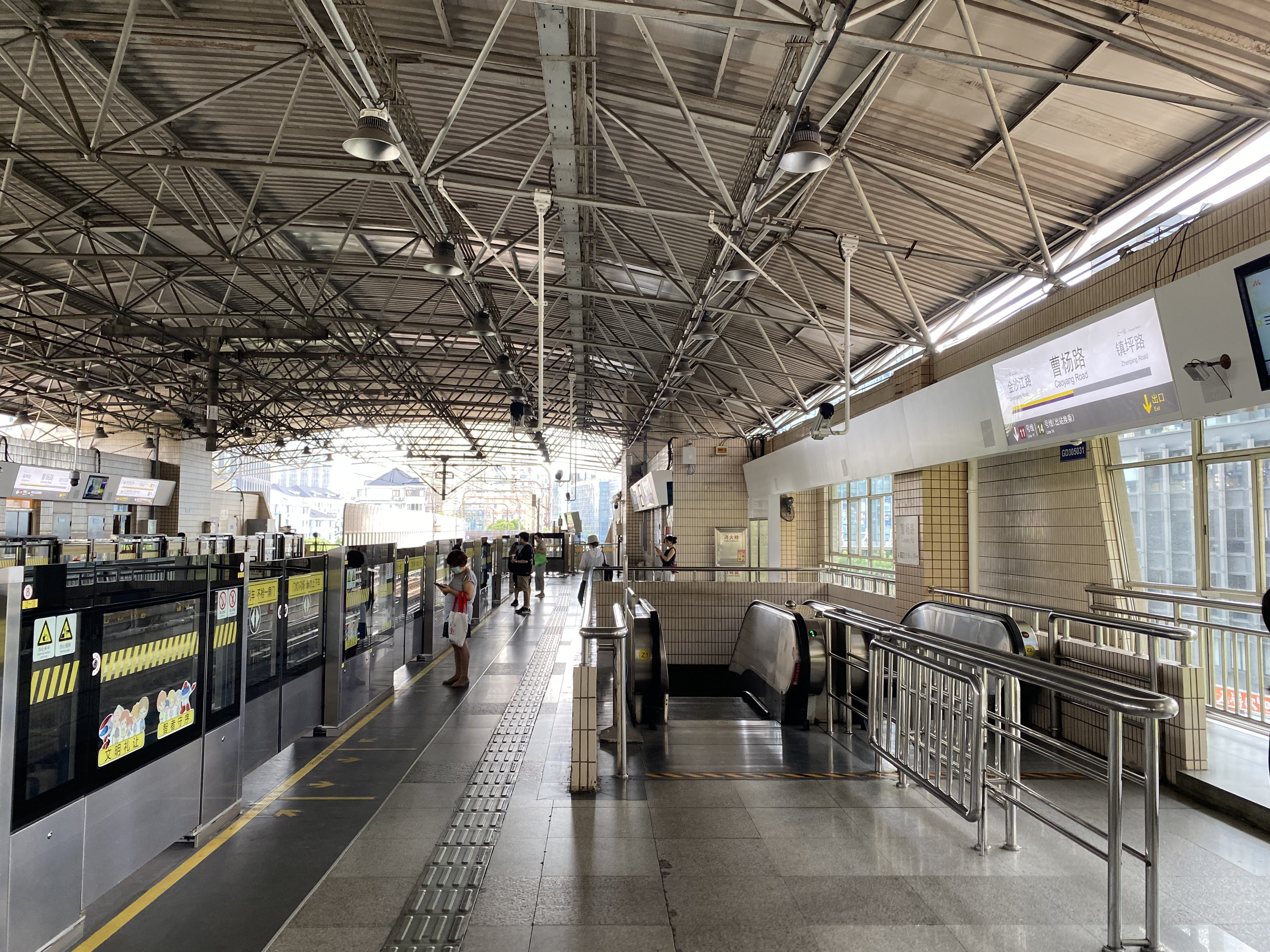
- Station platform for Lines 3 and 4

General information
- Location: North Kaixuan Road (凯旋北路) and Caoyang Road; Putuo District, Shanghai; China
- Operator: Shanghai No.2/3 Metro Operation Co. Ltd.
- Lines: Line 3; Line 4; Line 11; Line 14
- Platforms: 6 (3 side platforms and 3 island platforms)
- Tracks: 7

Construction
- Structure type: Elevated (Lines 3 & 4); Underground (Line 11 & 14)
- Accessible: Yes

History
- Opened: 26 December 2000; 25 years ago (Line 3); 31 December 2005; 20 years ago (Line 4); 31 December 2009; 16 years ago (Line 11); 30 December 2021; 4 years ago (Line 14)

Services
Preceding station	Shanghai Metro	Following station
Zhenping Road towards North Jiangyang Road	Line 3	Jinshajiang Road towards Shanghai South Railway Station
Zhenping Road Clockwise	Line 4	Jinshajiang Road Counter-clockwise
Fengqiao Road towards North Jiading or Huaqiao	Line 11	Longde Road towards Disney Resort
Zhongning Road towards Fengbang	Line 14	Wuning Road towards Guiqiao Road
Location
- Location within Shanghai

Caoyang Road (simplified Chinese: 曹杨路; traditional Chinese: 曹楊路; pinyin: Cáoyáng Lù) is an interchange station between lines 3, 4, 11 and 14 of the Shanghai Metro, and is located in Putuo District.

The station opened on 26 December 2000 as part of the initial section of Line 3 from Shanghai South Railway Station to Jiangwan Town, and Line 4 service began here on the final day of 2005. The interchange with Line 11 opened along with the first section of that line from Jiangsu Road to North Jiading. The interchange with Line 14 opened along with the line on 30 Dec. 2021, which is the virtual interchange.

== Station layout ==
=== Lines 3, 4 and 11 ===
2F	Side platform, doors open on the right
2F	Southbound/Counterclockwise	← Line 3 towards Shanghai South Railway Station (Jinshajiang Road) ← Line 4 to Jinshajiang Road
2F	Northbound/Clockwise	Line 3 towards North Jiangyang Road (Zhenping Road) → Line 4 to Zhenping Road →
2F	Side platform, doors open on the right
G	Line 3/4 Concourse	Faregates, Station Agent
G	Entrances and Exits	Exits 1–7
B1	Interchange Corridor
B2	Line 11 Concourse	Faregates, Station Agent
B3	Side platform, doors open on the left
B3	Southbound	Line 11 towards Disney Resort (Longde Road) →
B4	Side platform, doors open on the right
B4	Northbound	← Line 11 towards North Jiading or Huaqiao (Fengqiao Road)

=== Line 14 ===
1F	Ground level	Exits 8–13
B1	Concourse	Tickets, Service Center
B2	Side platform, doors open on the right
B2	Platform 5	← Line 14 towards Fengbang (Zhongning Road)
B2		Not in service
B2	Island platform, doors open on the left
B2	Platform 7	Line 14 towards Guiqiao Road (Wuning Road) →

=== Entrances/exits ===
Caoyang Road has 10 exits. Exits 2, 4-7 connect lines 3, 4 and 11, exits 8–10, 12-13 connect line 14.

- 2: Baiyu Road, Caoyang Road
- 4: Caoyang Road, Kaixuan Road (N)
- 5: Caoyang Road, Kaixuan Road (N)
- 6: Kaixuan Road (N), Caoyang Road
- 7: Kaixuan Road (N)
- 8: Dongxin Road, Wuning Road
- 9: Wuning Road, Puxiong Road
- 10: Wuning Road
- 12: Wuning Road, Kaixuan Road (N)
- 13: Kaixuan Road (N), Wuning Road, Zhongshan Road (N)

== Gallery ==
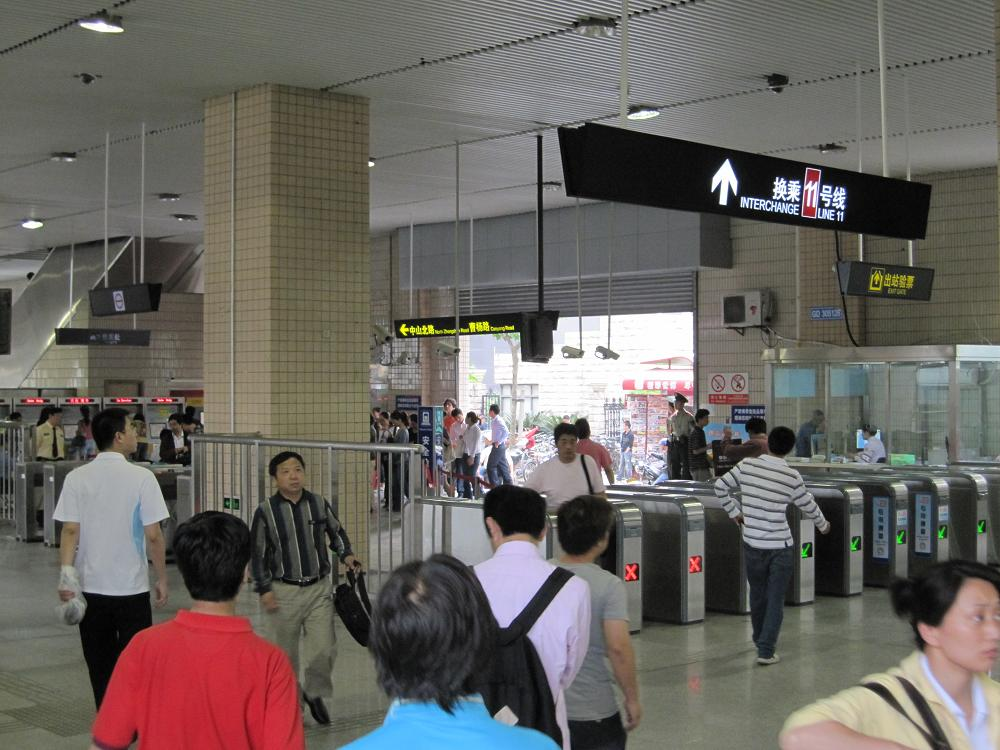
Line 3 & 4 Concourse

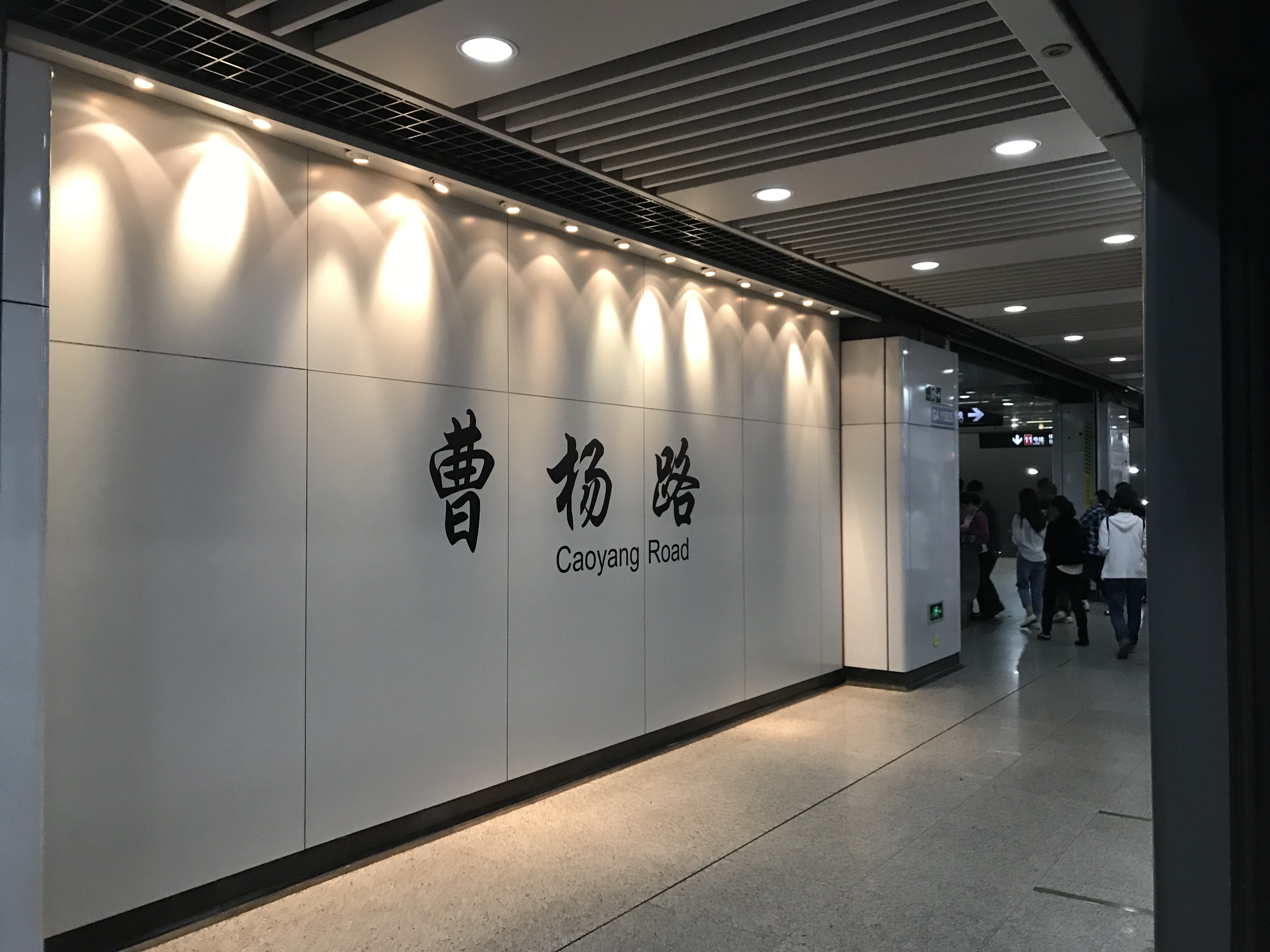
Line 11 platform

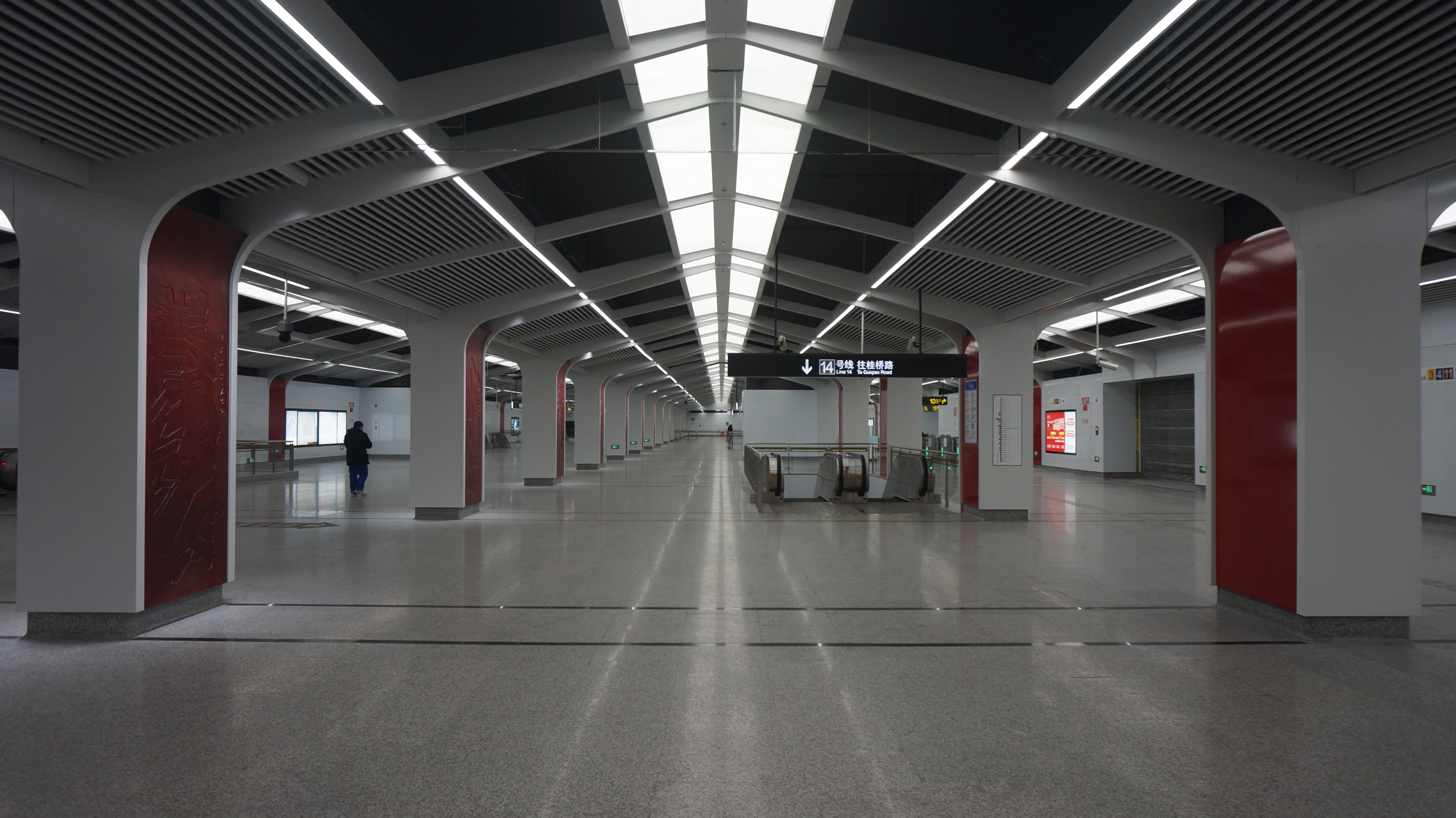
Line 14 station hall

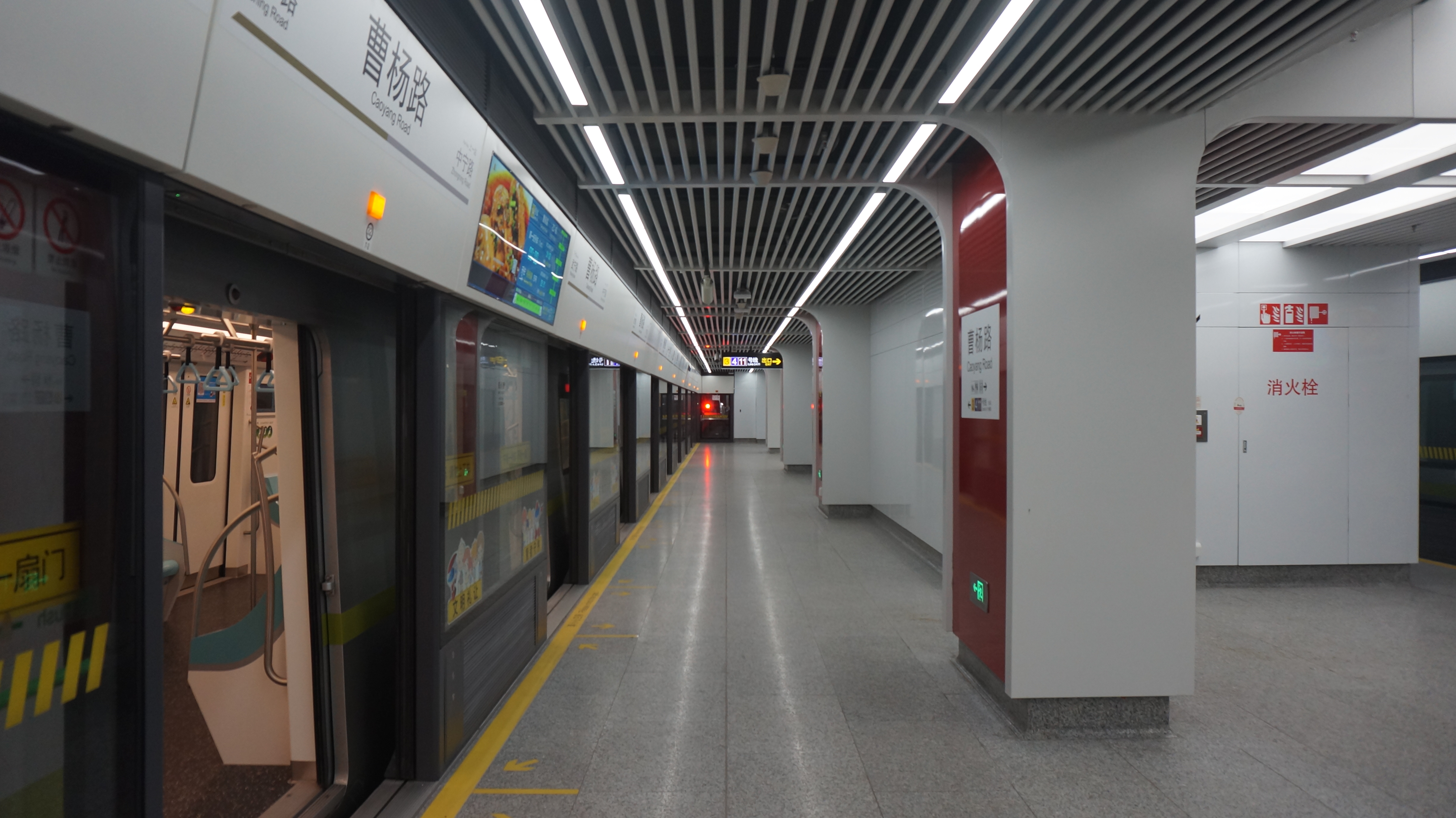
Line 14 platform
