= Lintao Road station =

Metro station in Shanghai, China

Lintao Road 临洮路
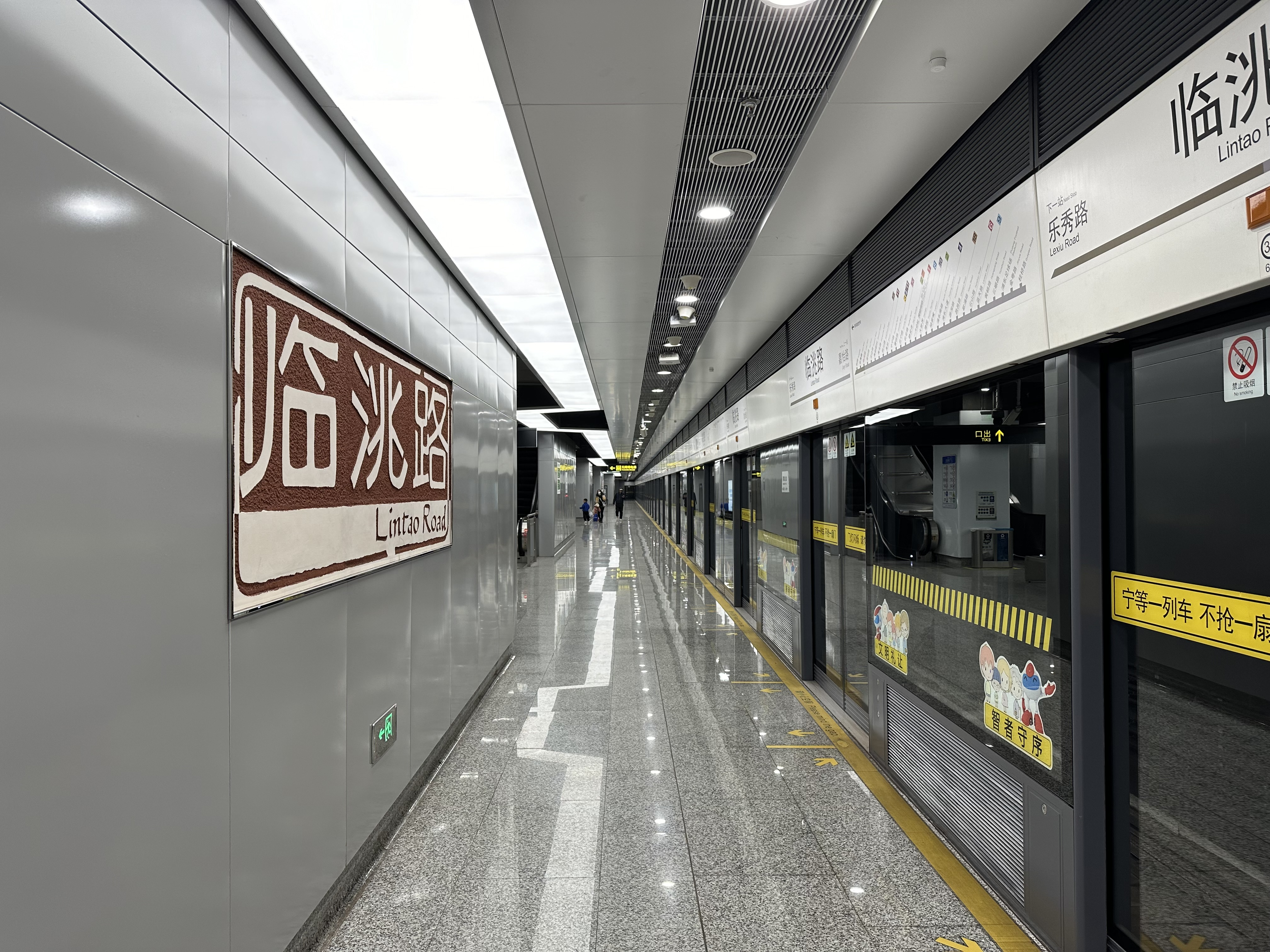
- Station platform

General information
- Location: Lintao Road and Cao'an Highway, Jiading District, Shanghai; China
- Coordinates: 31.265024°N 121.326354°E
- Line: Line 14
- Platforms: 2 (1 island platform)
- Tracks: 2

Construction
- Structure type: Underground
- Accessible: Yes

History
- Opened: 30 December 2021

Services
| Preceding station | Shanghai Metro | Following station |
|---|---|---|
| Lexiu Road towards Fengbang | Line 14 | Jiayi Road towards Guiqiao Road |
Location

Lintao Road (Chinese: 临洮路) is a station that is part of Line 14 of the Shanghai Metro. Located at the intersection of Lintao Road and Cao'an Highway in the city's Jiading District, the station opened with the rest of Line 14 on December 30, 2021.
