= Jing'an Temple station =

Metro station in Shanghai, China

Jing'an Temple 静安寺
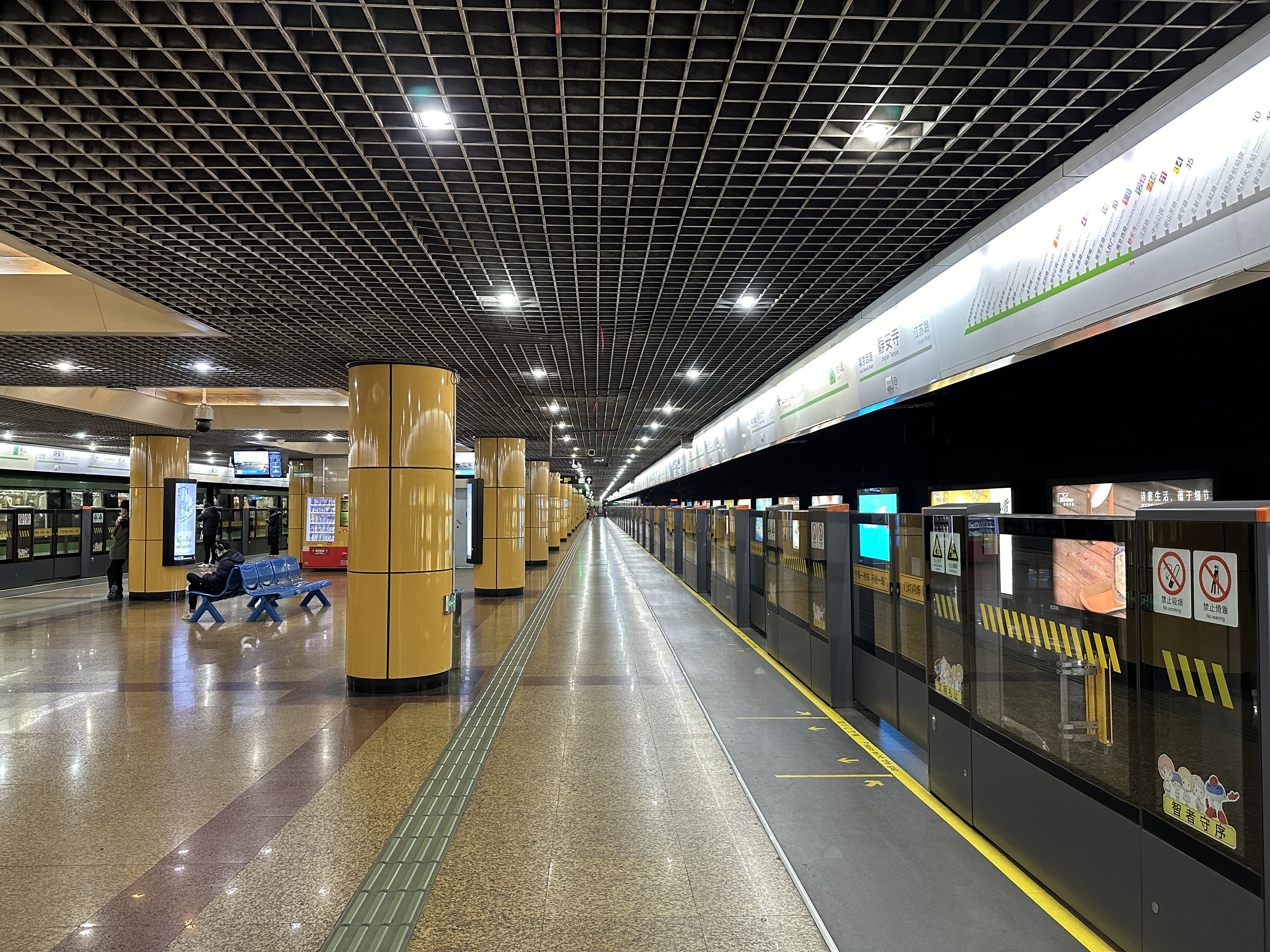
- Line 2 platform

General information
- Location: Nanjing West Road between Changde Road (常德路) and Huashan Road (华山路), Jing'an Temple; Jing'an District, Shanghai; China
- Coordinates: 31°13′23″N 121°26′46″E
- Operator: Shanghai No.2/3 Metro Operation Co. Ltd.
- Lines: Line 2; Line 7; Line 14
- Platforms: 6 (3 island platforms)
- Tracks: 6

Construction
- Structure type: Underground
- Accessible: Yes

History
- Opened: 20 September 1999 (Line 2); 5 December 2009 (Line 7); 30 December 2021 (Line 14)

Services
Preceding station	Shanghai Metro	Following station
Jiangsu Road towards Panxiang Road · Shanghai National Accounting Institute	Line 2	West Nanjing Road towards Pudong Airport Terminal 1&2
Changping Road towards Meilan Lake	Line 7	Changshu Road towards Huamu Road
Wuding Road towards Fengbang	Line 14	Site of the First CPC National Congress · South Huangpi Road towards Guiqiao Road
Location
- Location within Shanghai

Jing'an Temple (Chinese: 静安寺; pinyin: Jìng'ān Sì) is an interchange station between Lines 2, 7 and 14 of the Shanghai Metro. This station is located in Jing'an District, below the historic Jing'an Temple and the Jiu Guang shopping mall. It is part of the initial section of Line 2 that opened from Zhongshan Park to Longyang Road that opened on 20 September 1999; the interchange with line 7 opened on 5 December 2009 as part of that line's initial section between Shanghai University and Huamu Road and the interchange with line 14 opened on 30 December 2021.

There are shuttle buses between Jing'an Temple and Hongqiao or Pudong airports. The shuttle bus from Pudong leaves the airport as 'Airport Bus Line 2' towards the 'Airport City Terminal' which is the official name of the Jingan Temple shuttle bus station and costs 22 ¥ as of January 2015. The ride takes about half an hour from Hongqiao Airport and 45–60 minutes depending on traffic from Pudong Airport. From Pudong the bus is usually faster and more convenient than the subway connection.

== Incidents ==
Thirteen people were injured in 2014 when an escalator connecting Line 2 and Line 7 malfunctioned. The upward-moving escalator's drive chain snapped during the morning rush hour, according to Shanghai Shentong Metro Group, the city's metro operator.

== Station layout ==
1F	Ground level	Exits
B1	Line 2 concourse	Tickets, Service Center
B1	Line 7 mezzanine	Underground metro mall
B1	Line 14 concourse	Tickets, Service Center
B2	Platform 1	← Line 2 towards Panxiang Road · Shanghai National Accounting Institute (Jiangsu Road)
B2	Island platform, doors open on the left
B2	Platform 2	Line 2 towards Pudong Airport Terminal 1&2 (West Nanjing Road) →
B2	Line 7 concourse	Tickets, Service Center
B3	Platform 1	← Line 7 towards Meilan Lake (Changping Road)
B3	Island platform, doors open on the left
B3	Platform 2	Line 7 towards Huamu Road (Changshu Road) →
B3	Platform 5	← Line 14 towards Fengbang (Wuding Road)
B3	Island platform, doors open on the left
B3	Platform 6	Line 14 towards Guiqiao Road (Site of the First CPC National Congress · South Huangpi Road) →

== Places nearby ==
- Jing'an Temple
- Nanjing Road (W.)
- Jing'an Park
- Apple Jing'an

== Gallery ==
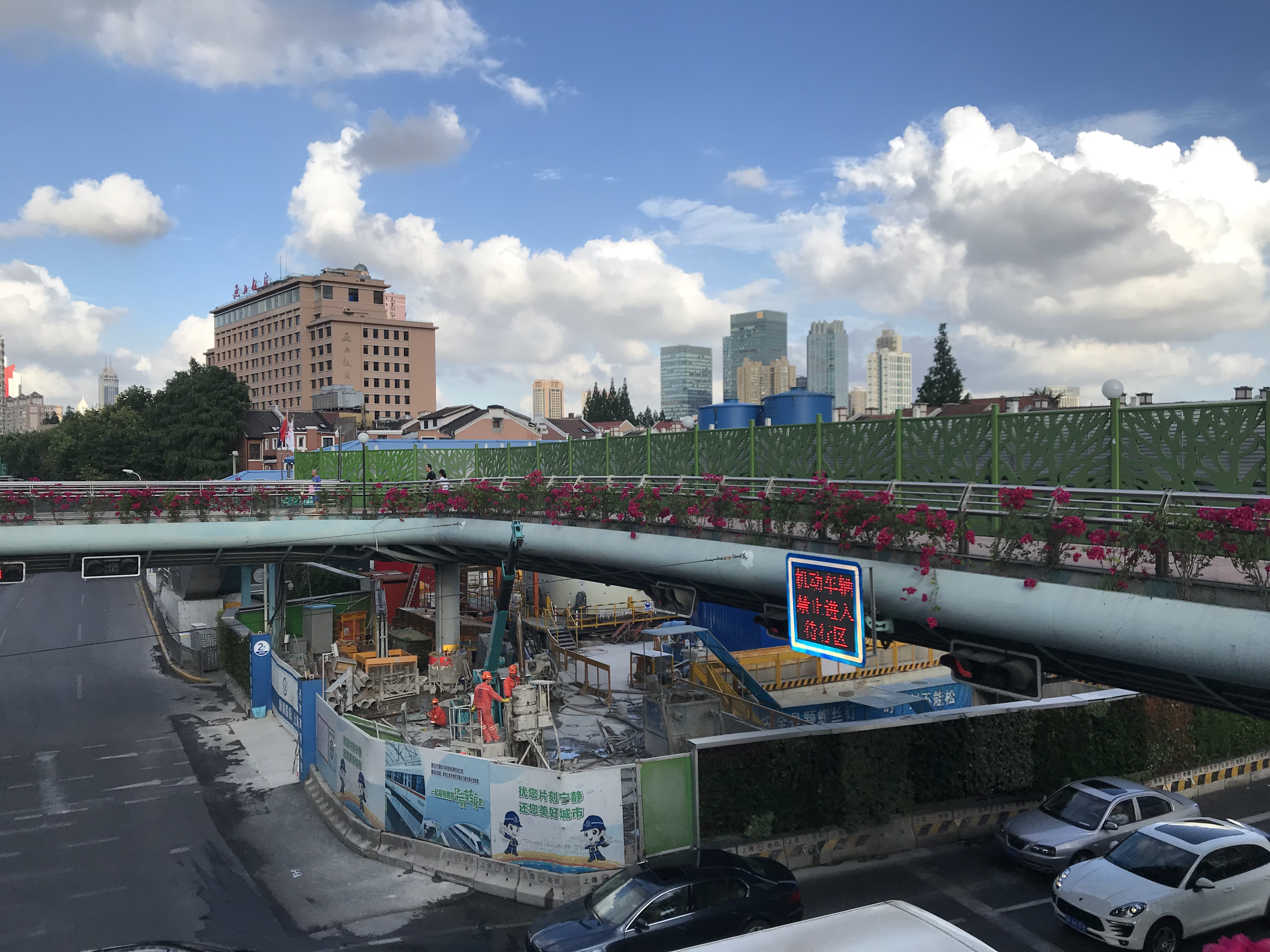
Line 14 station under construction

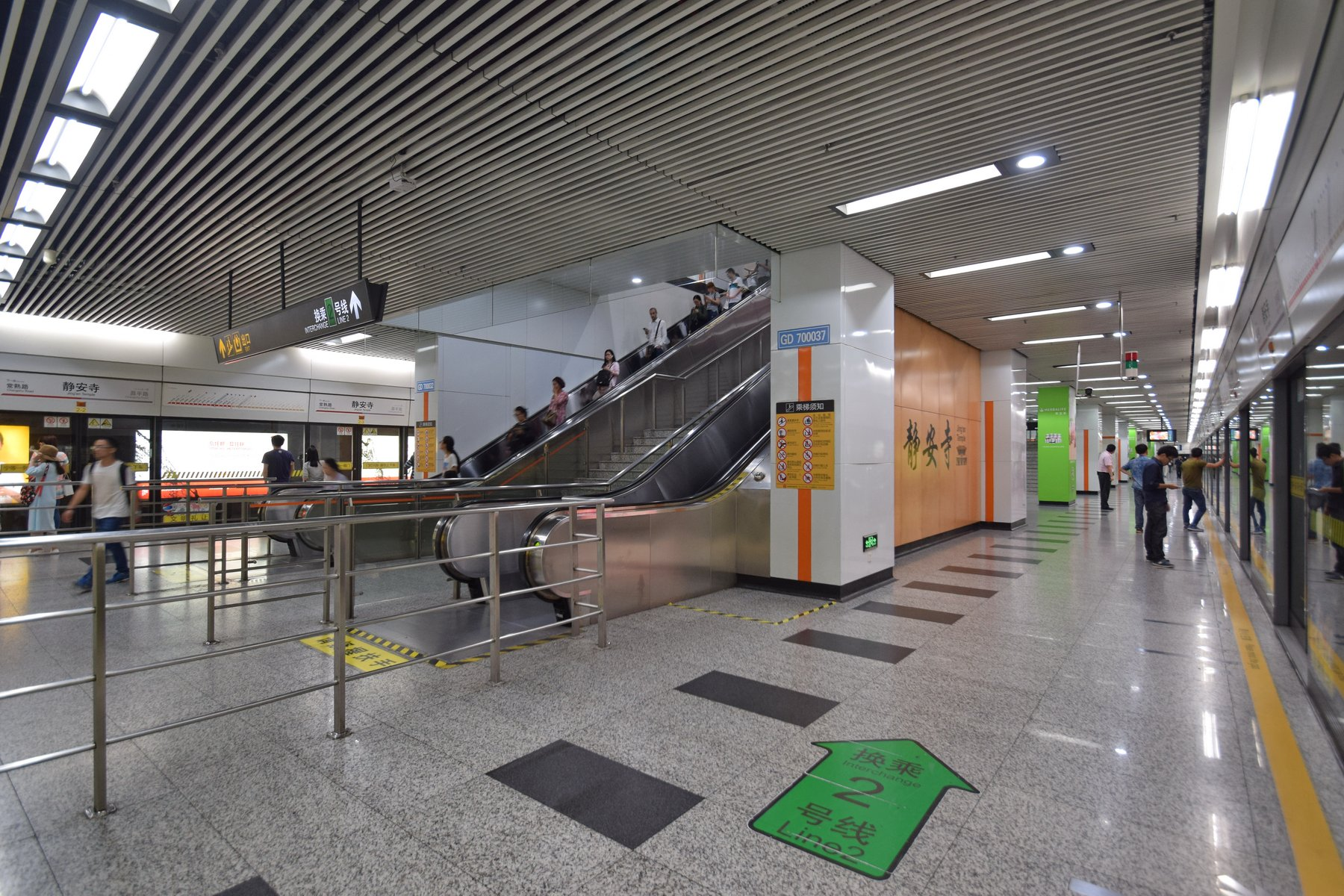
Line 7 platform

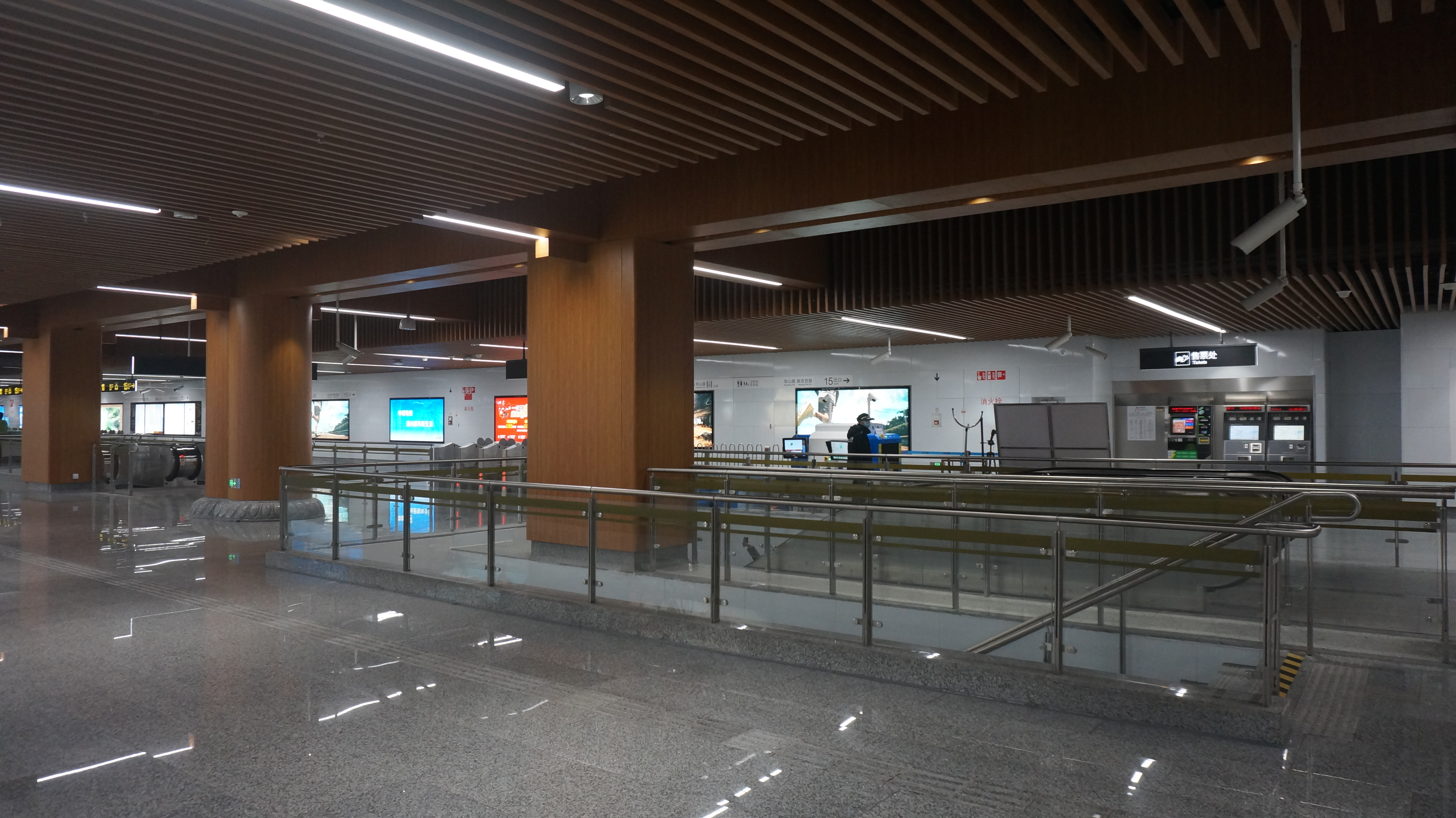
Line 14 station hall

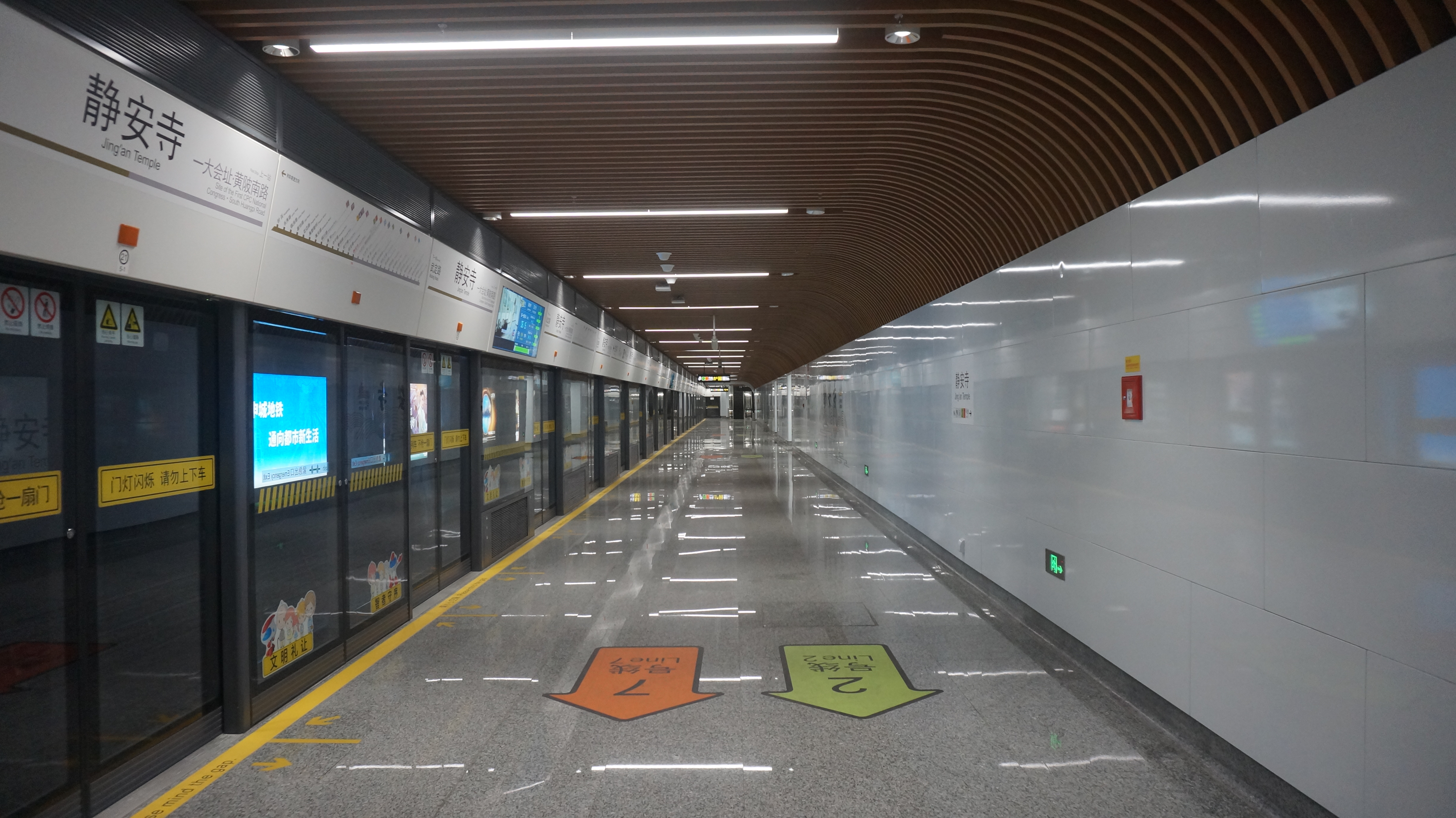
Line 14 platform
