= Zhongning Road station =

Metro station in Shanghai, China

Zhongning Road 中宁路
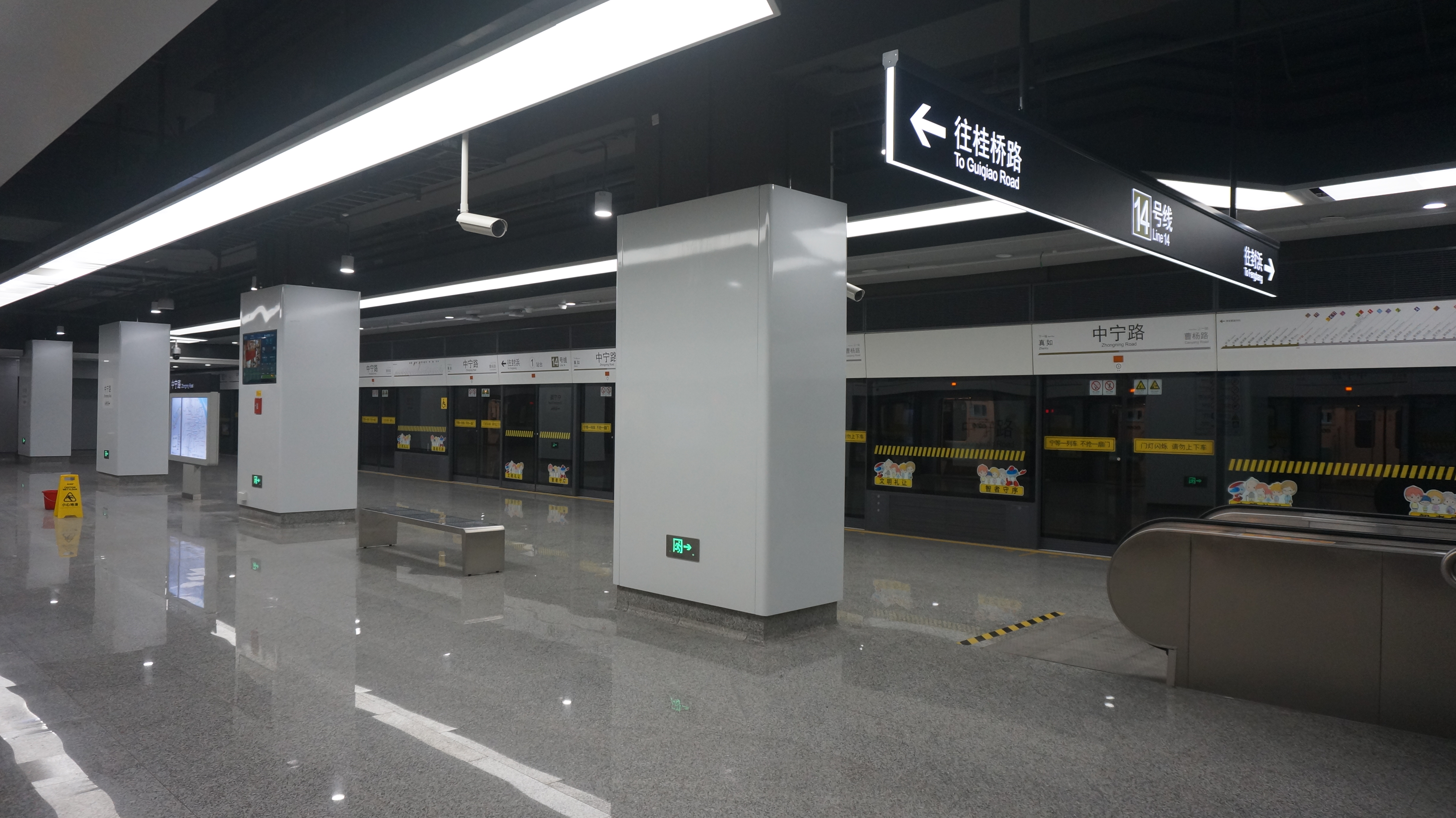
- Station platform

General information
- Location: Zhongning Road and Wuning Road, Putuo District, Shanghai; China
- Coordinates: 31.247343°N 121.408965°E
- Line: Line 14
- Platforms: 2 (1 island platform)
- Tracks: 2

Construction
- Structure type: Underground
- Accessible: Yes

History
- Opened: 30 December 2021

Services
Preceding station	Shanghai Metro	Following station
Zhenru towards Fengbang	Line 14	Caoyang Road towards Guiqiao Road
Location

Zhongning Road (Chinese: 中宁路) is a station that is part of Line 14 of the Shanghai Metro. Located at the intersection of Zhongning Road and Wuning Road in the city's Putuo District, the station opened with the rest of Line 14 on 30 December 2021.
