= Wuding =

Wuding may refer to:

- Wuding County, Yunnan, China
- Wuding River, in Shaanxi, China
- Yongding River, formerly known as Wuding River, a Chinese river that flows through Inner Mongolia, Shanxi, Hebei, Beijing, and Tianjin
- Wuding (543–550), an era name used by Emperor Xiaojing of Eastern Wei
- Wu Ding (fl. 13th–12th century BC), king of the Shang dynasty
- Wuding Road station of the Shanghai Metro
