= Jing'an Temple =

Buddhist temple in Shanghai, China

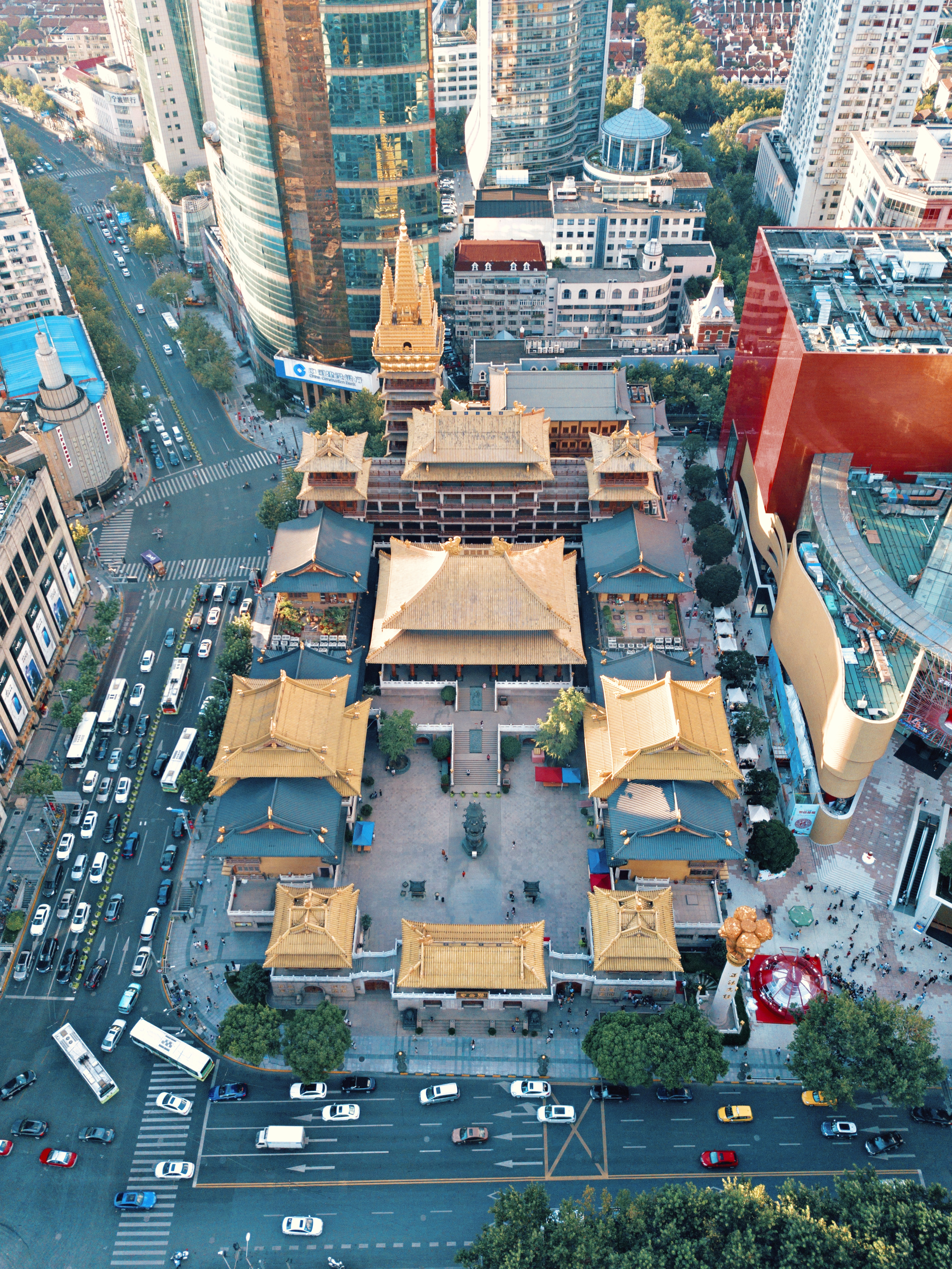
- Aerial view of Jing'an Temple

- Location in Shanghai

Religion
- Affiliation: Buddhism

Location
- Country: China
- Coordinates: 31°13′25″N 121°26′43″E

Architecture
- Completed: 1983 (rebuilt)

Jing'an Temple (simplified Chinese: 静安寺; traditional Chinese: 靜安寺; pinyin: Jìng'ān Sì; Shanghainese: Zin'oe Zy; lit. 'Temple of Peace and Tranquility'; historically Bubbling Well Temple) is an esoteric Tangmi Buddhist temple on West Nanjing Road (historically Nanking or Bubbling Well Road in English) in Shanghai.

== History ==
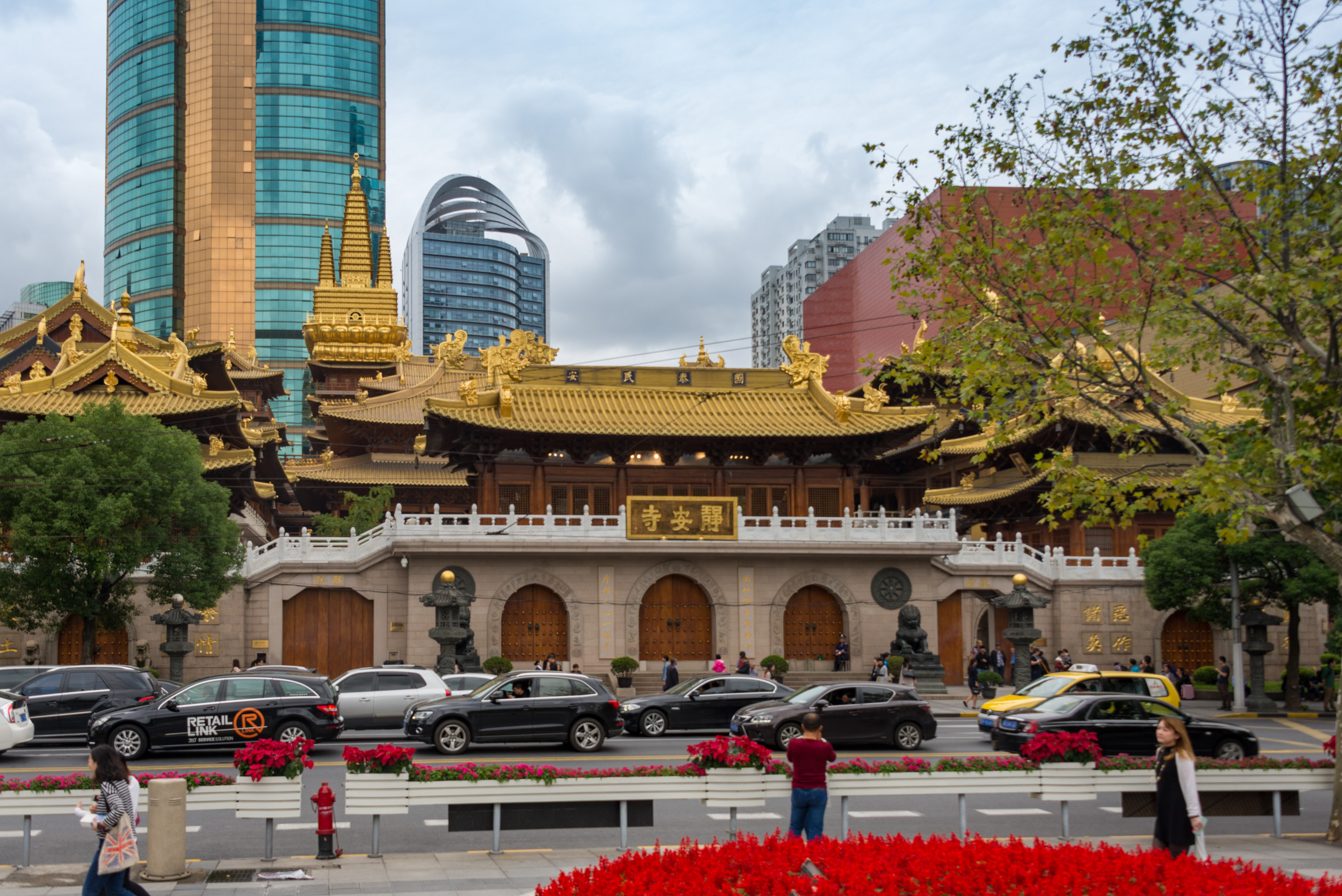
The front gates of Jing'an Temple

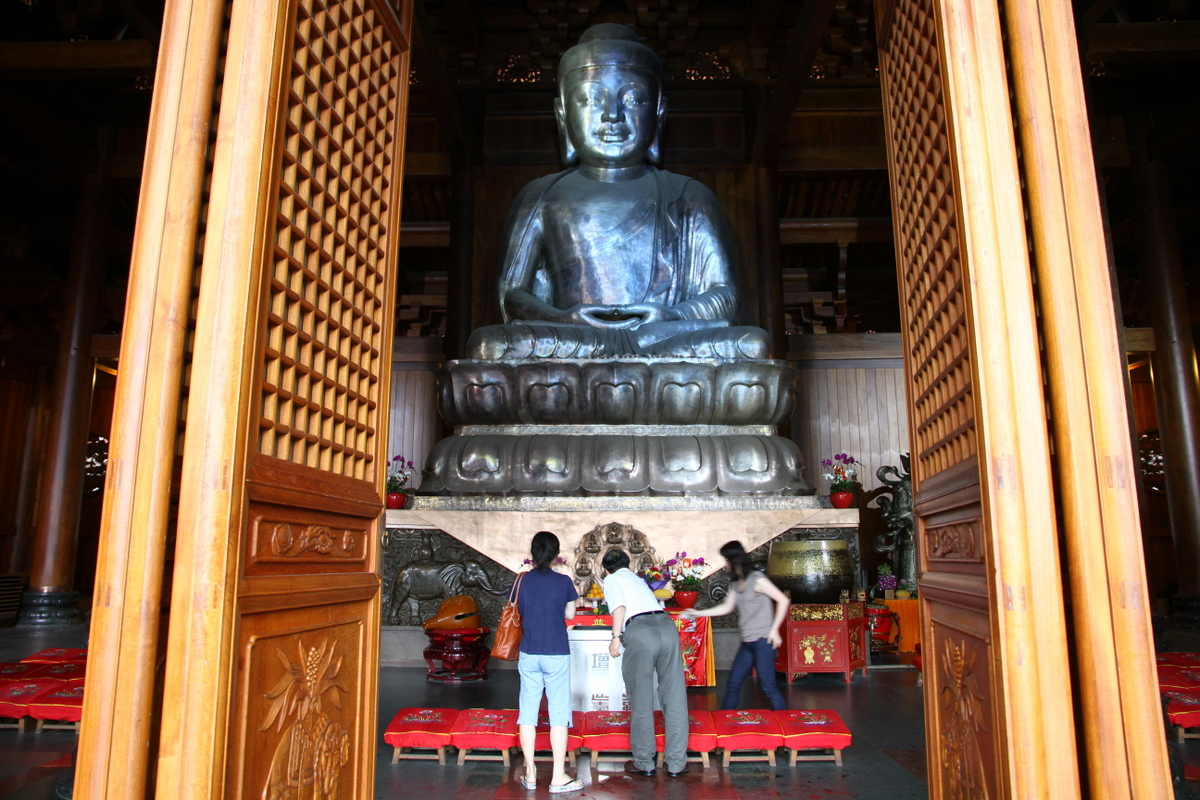
Buddha in the Daxiongbao Hall

The original temple was first built in 247 AD in the Wu Kingdom during the Three Kingdoms period of ancient China. Originally located beside the Suzhou Creek, it was relocated to the Jing'an site in 1216 during the Song dynasty. The temple was rebuilt in the Qing dynasty but, during the Cultural Revolution, the temple was razed and turned into a plastic factory. In 1983, the site was returned to its original purpose and the temple rebuilt. Over the years, the temple has been expanded, with the Jing'an Pagoda being completed in 2010. In 1953, Master Chisong (釋持松), a renowned Republican monk who had been initiated into Japanese esoteric Buddhism, including the Shingon and Tendai sect, and trained as an acharya, was appointed abbot of the temple. He reestablished the temple under the Tangmi Buddhist tradition and enshrined the Mandala of the Two Realms within the temple. In contemporary times, the temple still officially practices Tangmi Buddhism. On December 19, 2009, a 15-ton silver statue of Buddha Rudra cast in pure silver was installed in Jing'an Temple. More than ten 3-ton silver statues of the Bodhisattva and the disciples were added to the Daxiongbao Hall.

== Features ==
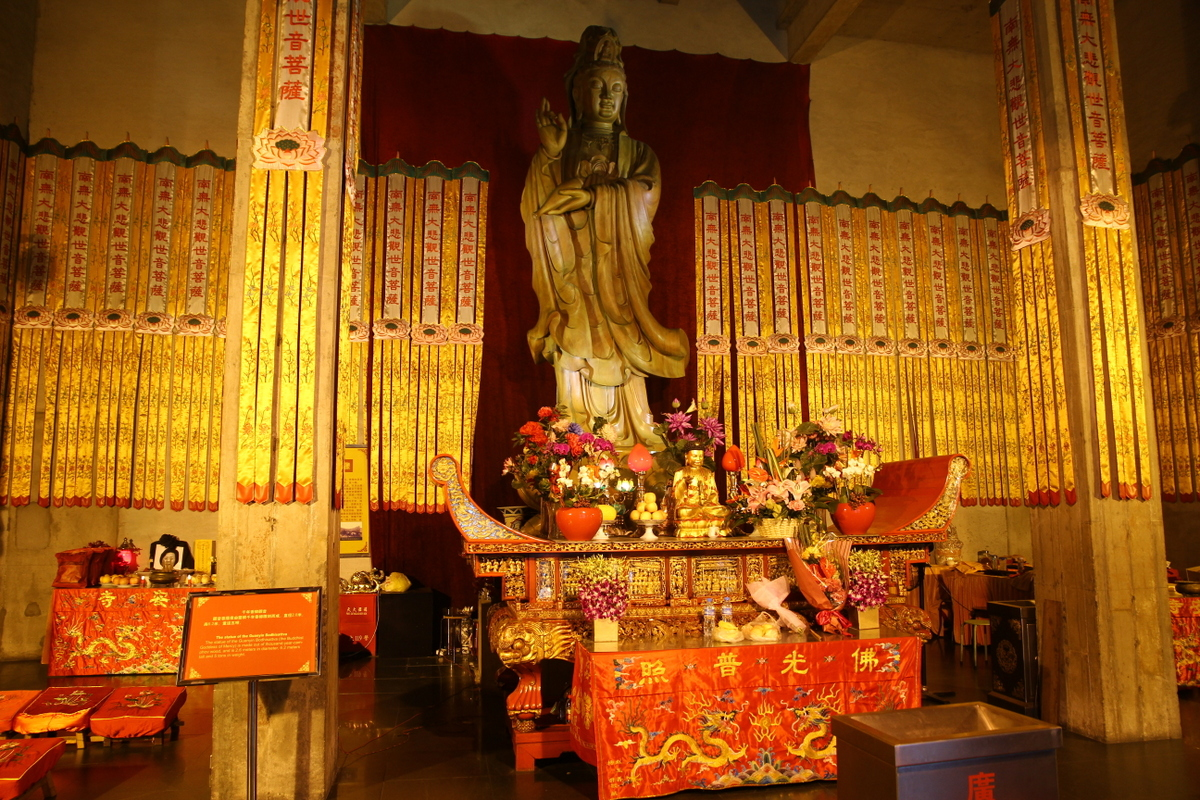
The Guanyin Hall

Three Southern-style halls, each with its own courtyard, dating from the most recent reconstruction (1880):

- Tianwang Hall
- Hall of the Three Saints
- Hall of Virtuous Works
- The Daxiongbao Hall ("Precious Hall of the Great Hero"), the main hall
- To the east of the main hall is the Guanyin Hall. In the center of the hall is a statue of the goddess made out of camphor wood. Standing on a lotus-shaped base, it is 6.2 meters tall and weighs 5 metric tons
- Opposite the hall is the Jade Buddha Hall, where a 3.8-meter jade Buddha sits in the center. It is the largest sitting jade Buddha statue in the country
- Abbot's Chambers
- Ming Dynasty copper bell (Hongwu Bell), weighing 3.5 tons
- Stone Buddhas from the Southern and Northern Dynasties period (420-589 AD)
- Paintings by master painters, Chu Zhishan, Zhang Daqian and Wen Zhenming
- Mandalas enshrined at a tantric altar on the upper floor

== Transportation ==
The temple sits on top of the Jing'an Temple Station, a major hub of the Shanghai Metro network where Line 2, Line 7, and Line 14 intersect.

You can take Bus No. 113, 40, 830, 824, 20, 15, 37, and 21 to arrive at Jing'an Temple.

There are also Shuttle Express Service provided from airports to Jing'an Temple. Pudong Airport Shuttle Bus Line No. 2 run from City Terminal (beside Jing'an Temple)

== Opening Time ==
The temple opens at 7:30AM and closes at 5:00PM daily in most times of the year.
