= Xiepu Road station =

Metro station in Shanghai, China

Xiepu Road 歇浦路
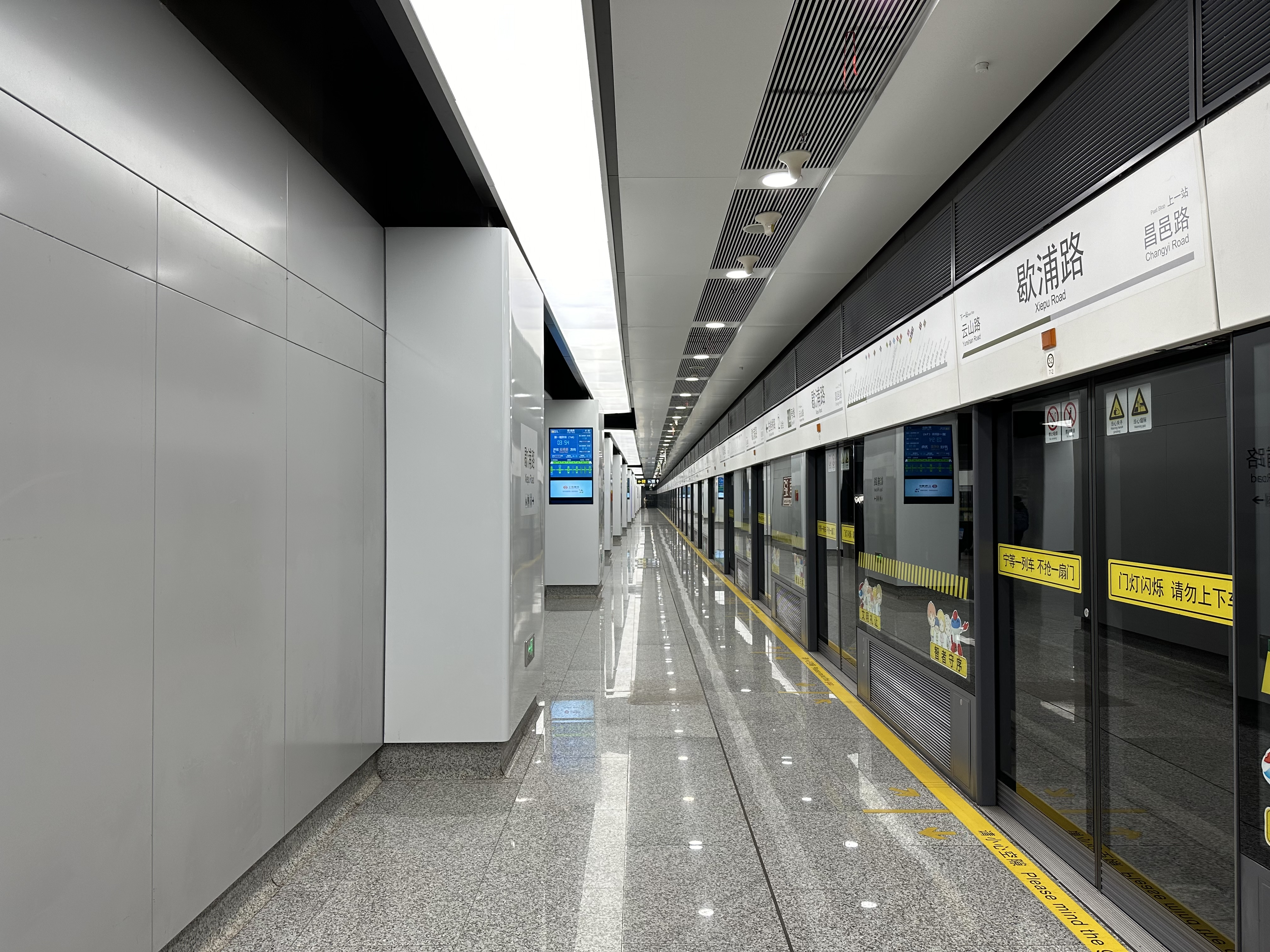
- Station platform

General information
- Location: Xiepu Road and Pudong Avenue, Pudong, Shanghai; China
- Coordinates: 31.252112°N 121.546284°E
- Line: Line 14
- Platforms: 2 (1 island platform)
- Tracks: 2

Construction
- Structure type: Underground
- Accessible: Yes

History
- Opened: 30 December 2021

Services
Preceding station	Shanghai Metro	Following station
Changyi Road towards Fengbang	Line 14	Yunshan Road towards Guiqiao Road
Location

Xiepu Road (Chinese: 歇浦路) is a station that is part of Line 14 of the Shanghai Metro. Located at the intersection of Luoshan Road and Pudong Avenue in Pudong, the station opened with the rest of Line 14 on December 30, 2021. The station is located on the south side of the Yangpu Bridge. The name of the station comes from Xiepu Road, the road parallel to Luoshan Road.
