= Wuding Road station =

Metro station in Shanghai, China

Wuding Road 武定路
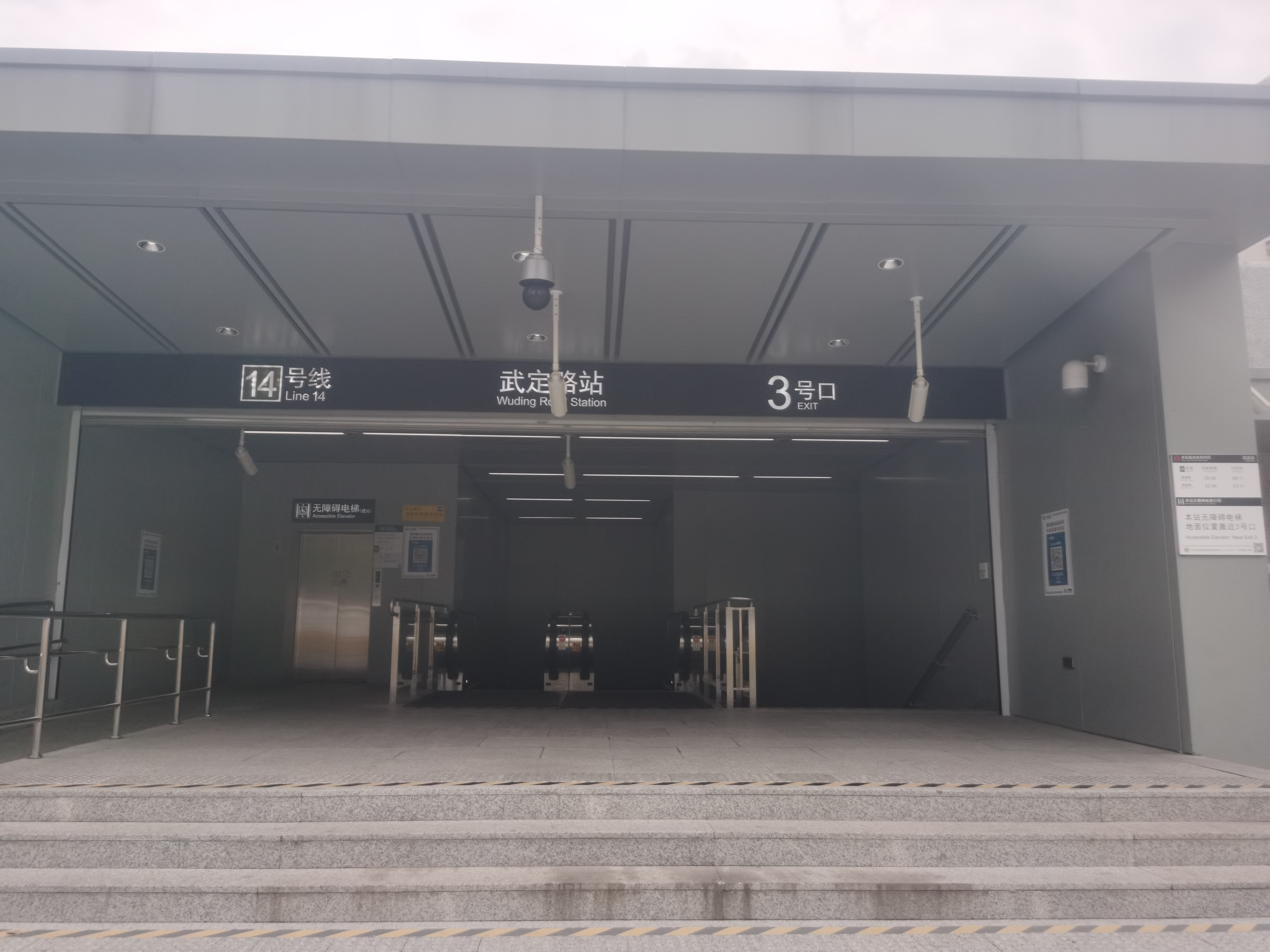
- Exit 3 of Wuding Road Station

General information
- Location: Wuding Road and South Wuning Road, Jing'an District, Shanghai; China
- Coordinates: 31.228920°N 121.431989°E
- Line: Line 14
- Platforms: 2 (1 island platform)
- Tracks: 2

Construction
- Structure type: Underground
- Accessible: Yes

History
- Opened: 30 December 2021

Services
Preceding station	Shanghai Metro	Following station
Wuning Road towards Fengbang	Line 14	Jing'an Temple towards Guiqiao Road
Location

Wuding Road (Chinese: 武定路) is a station that is part of Line 14 of the Shanghai Metro. Located at the intersection of Wuding Road and South Wuning Road in the city's Jing'an District, the station opened with the rest of Line 14 on December 30, 2021.
