= Wuning Road station =

Shanghai Metro station

Wuning Road 武宁路
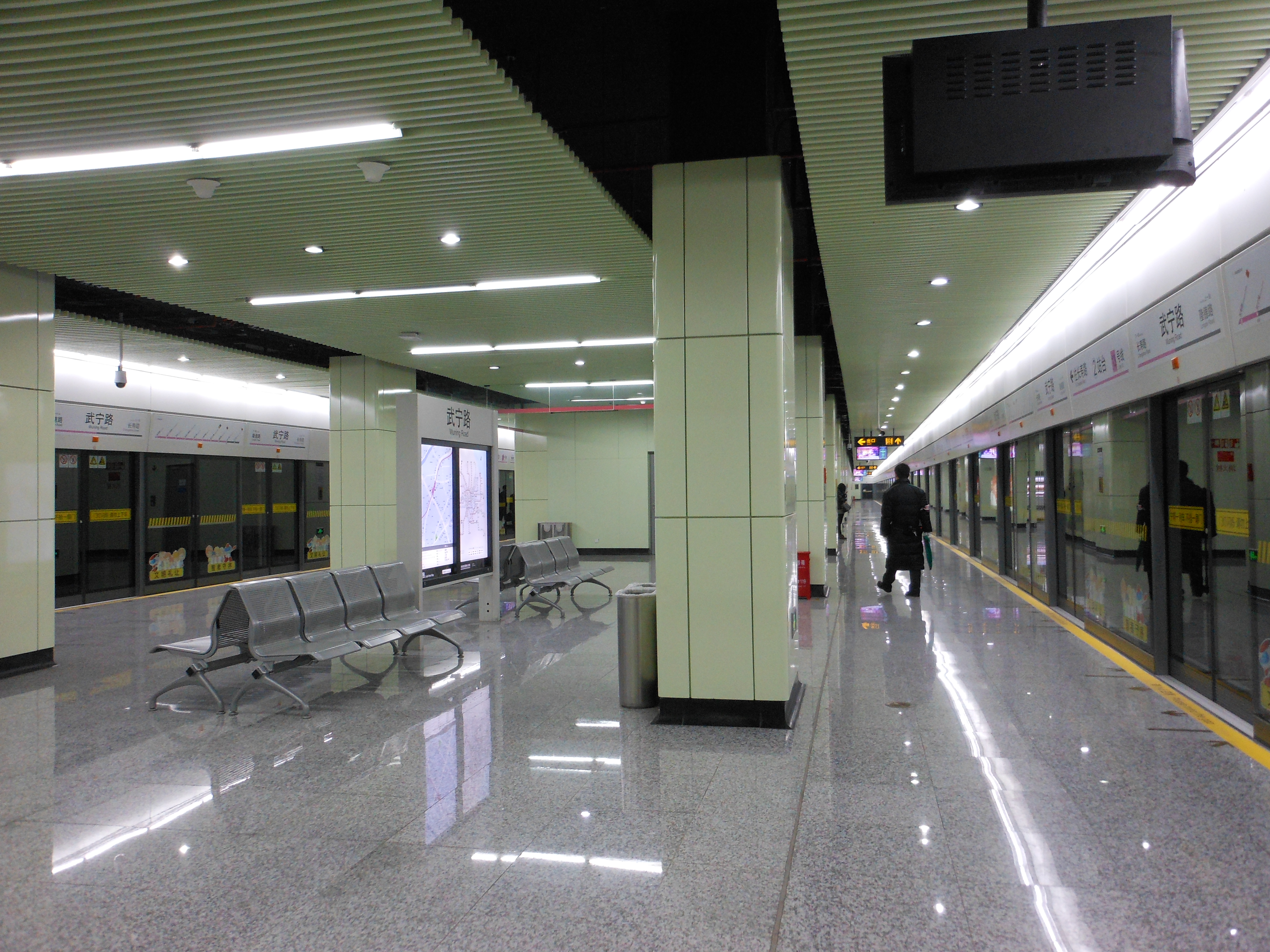
- Wuning Road platform

General information
- Location: Changshou Road and Wuning Road (武宁路); Putuo District and Jing'an District boundary, Shanghai; China
- Coordinates: 31.2358°N 121.4258°E
- Operated by: Shanghai No. 2 Metro Operation Co. Ltd.
- Lines: Line 13; Line 14
- Platforms: 4 (2 island platforms)
- Tracks: 4

Construction
- Structure type: Underground
- Accessible: Yes

History
- Opened: 28 December 2014 (Line 13); 30 December 2021 (Line 14)

Services
Preceding station	Shanghai Metro	Following station
Longde Road towards Jinyun Road	Line 13	Changshou Road towards Zhangjiang Road
Caoyang Road towards Fengbang	Line 14	Wuding Road towards Guiqiao Road
Location

Wuning Road (simplified Chinese: 武宁路; traditional Chinese: 武寧路; pinyin: Wǔníng Lù) is an interchange station on Line 13 and Line 14 on the Shanghai Metro. Line 13 opened on 28 December 2014. It became an interchange station with commencement of operations on line 14 on 30 December 2021.

== Station Layout ==
G	Entrances and Exits	Exits 1-5
B1	Line 13 Concourse	Faregates, Station Agent
B1	Line 14 Concourse	Faregates, Station Agent
B2	Northbound	← Line 14 towards Fengbang (Caoyang Road)
B2	Island platform, doors open on the left
B2	Southbound	Line 14 towards Guiqiao Road (Wuding Road) →
B3	Westbound	← Line 13 towards Jinyun Road (Longde Road)
B3	Island platform, doors open on the left
B3	Eastbound	Line 13 towards Zhangjiang Road (Changshou Road) →

== Gallery ==
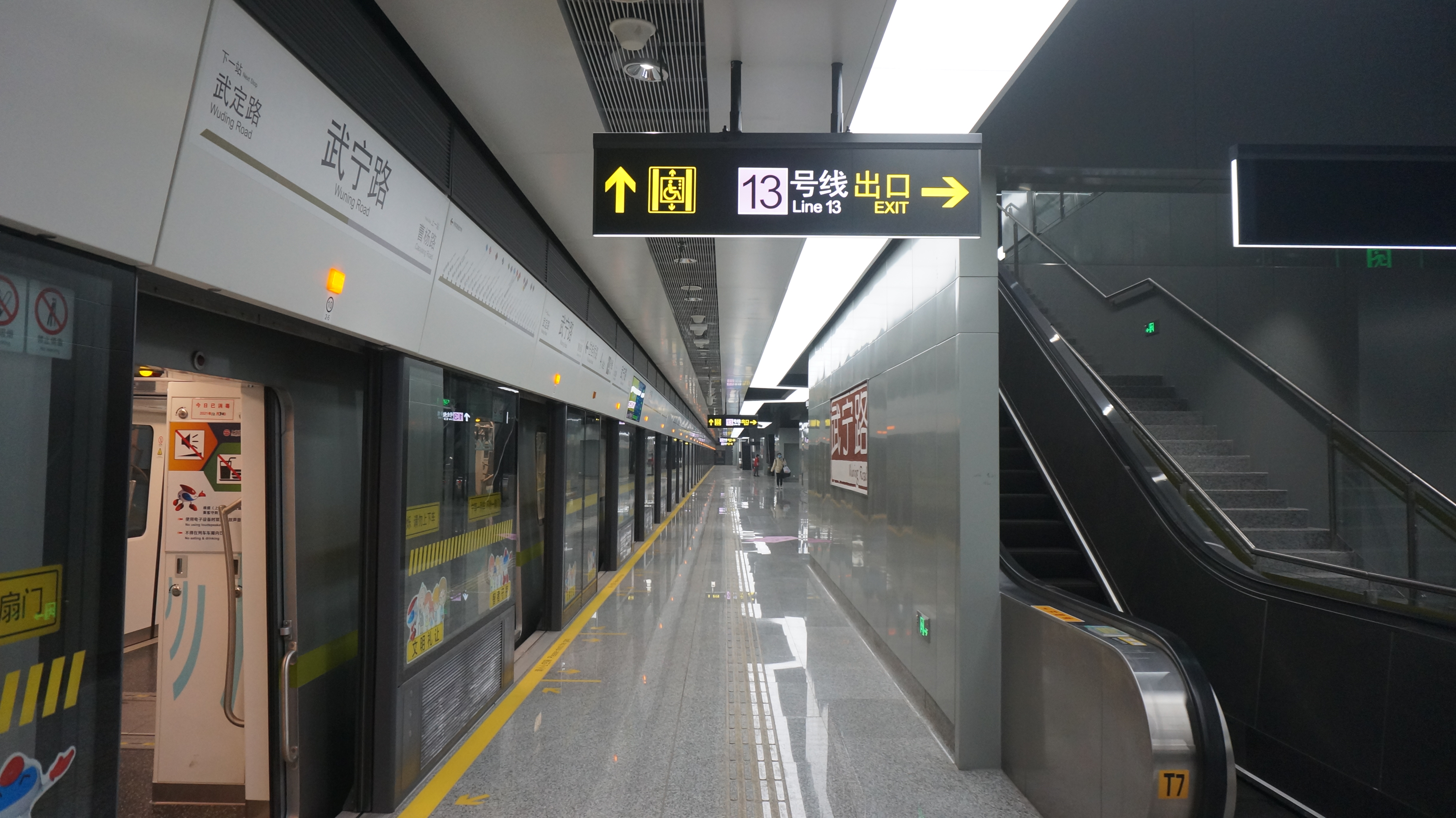
Line 14 platform

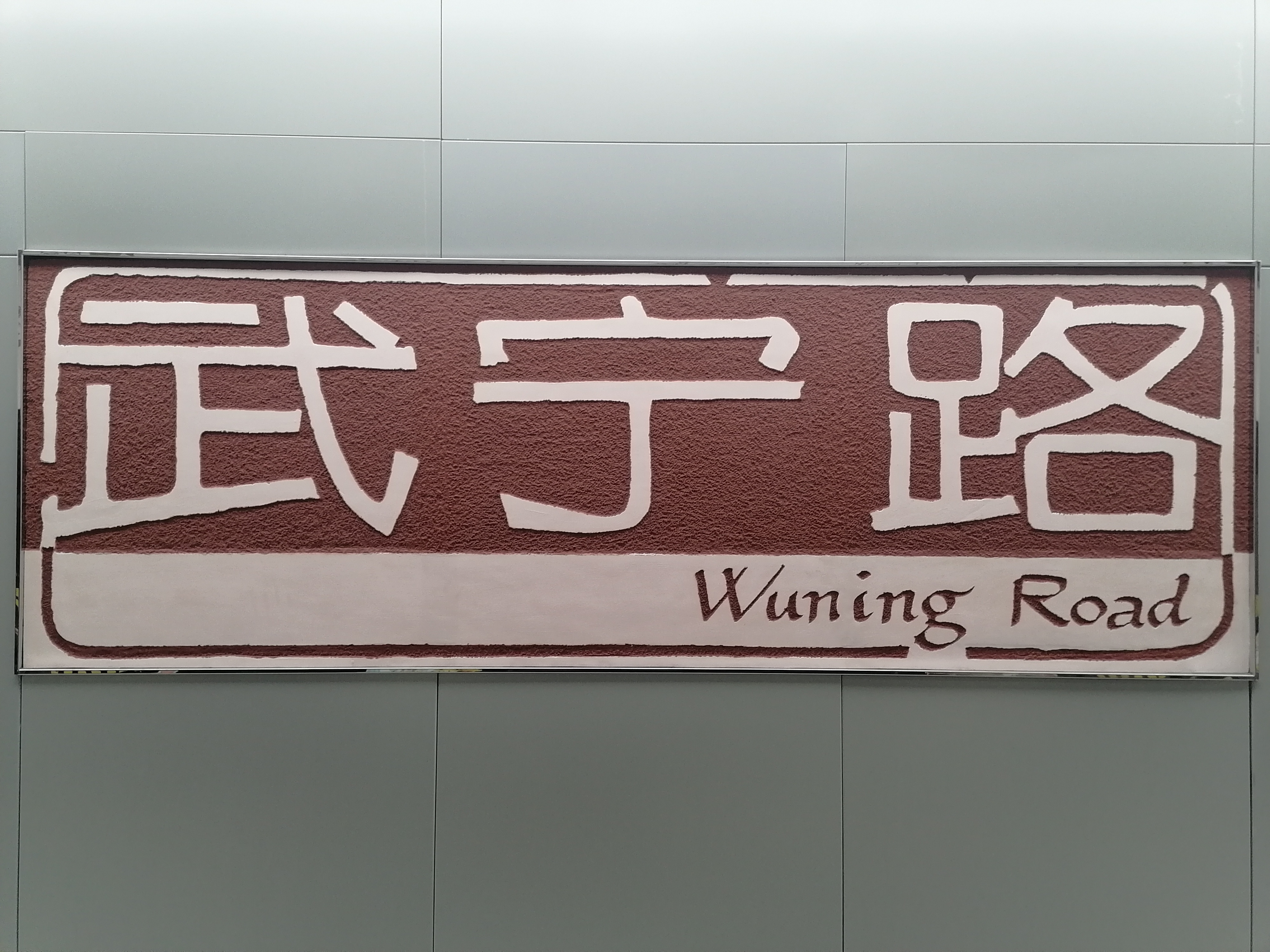
Line 14 station sign
