= Lexiu Road station =

Metro station in Shanghai, China

Lexiu Road 乐秀路
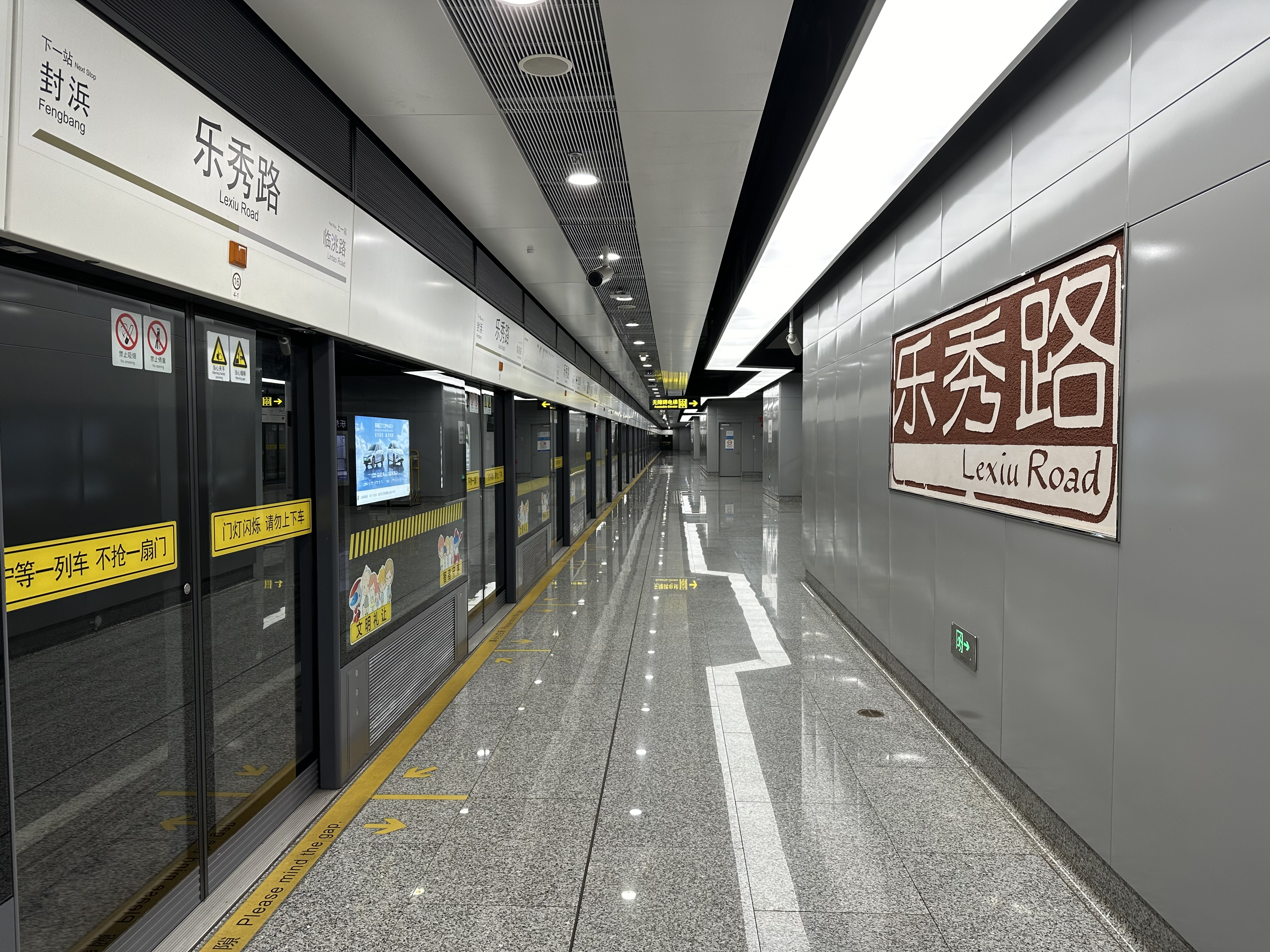
- Station platform

General information
- Location: Lexiu Road and Cao'an Highway, Jiading District, Shanghai; China
- Coordinates: 31.267270°N 121.309629°E
- Line: Line 14
- Platforms: 2 (1 island platform)
- Tracks: 2

Construction
- Structure type: Underground
- Accessible: Yes

History
- Opened: 30 December 2021
- Previous names: Jinyuanwu Road

Services
| Preceding station | Shanghai Metro | Following station |
|---|---|---|
| Fengbang Terminus | Line 14 | Lintao Road towards Guiqiao Road |
Location

Lexiu Road (simplified Chinese: 乐秀路; traditional Chinese: 樂秀路; pinyin: Lèxiù Lù), formerly known as Jinyuanwu Road (simplified Chinese: 金园五路; traditional Chinese: 金園五路; pinyin: Jīnyuánwǔ Lù), is a station that is part of Line 14 of the Shanghai Metro. Located at the intersection of Lexiu Road and Cao'an Highway in the city's Jiading District, the station opened with the rest of Line 14 on December 30, 2021.
