= Yunshan Road station =

Shanghai Metro station

Yunshan Road 云山路
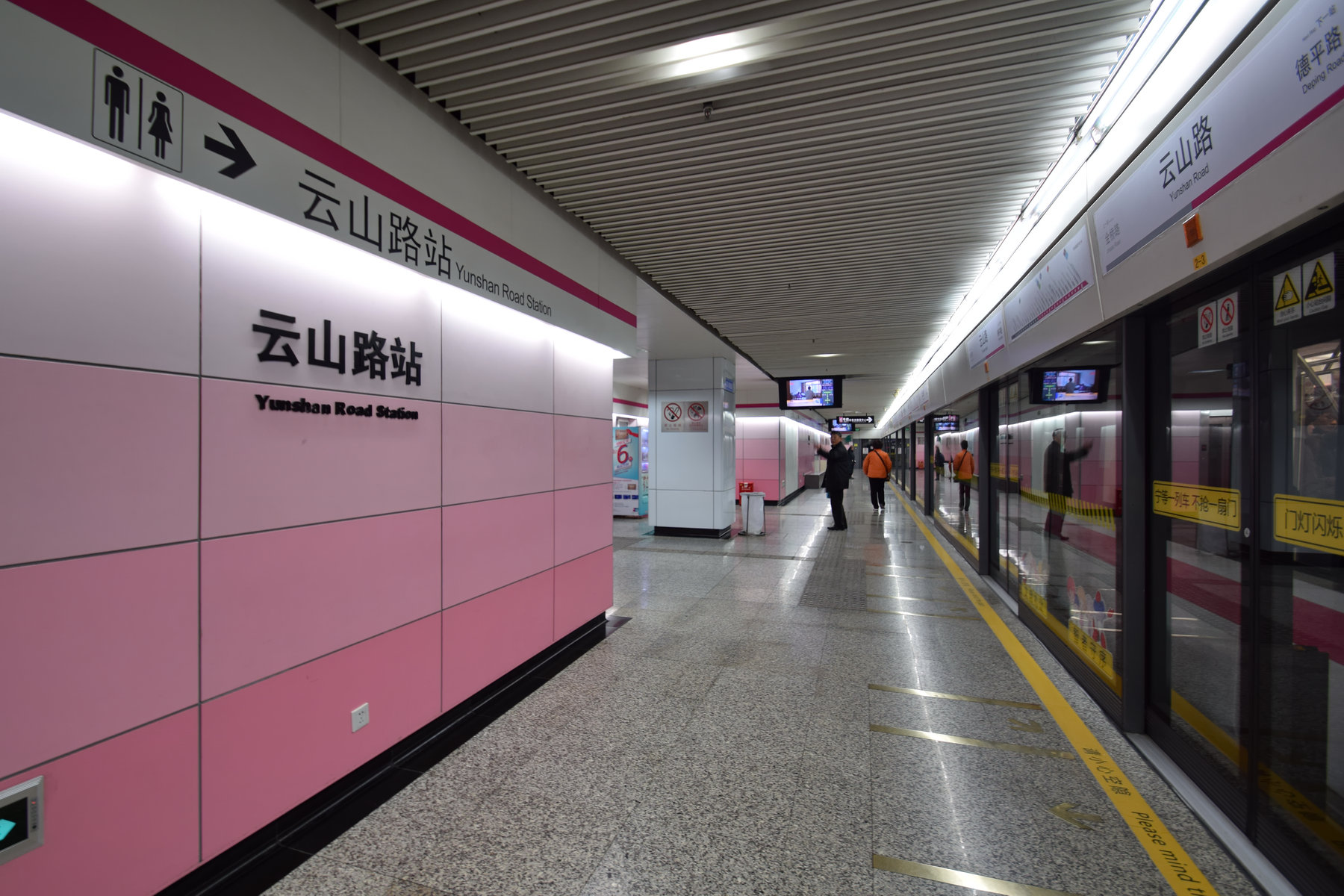
- Platform on Line 6

General information
- Location: Zhangyang Road and Yunshan Road (云山路); Pudong, Shanghai; China
- Coordinates: 31.2525°N 121.568°E
- Operator: Shanghai No. 4 Metro Operation Co. Ltd.
- Lines: Line 6; Line 14
- Platforms: 4 (1 island platform and 2 side platforms)
- Tracks: 4

Construction
- Structure type: Underground
- Accessible: Yes

History
- Opened: 29 December 2007 (Line 6); 30 December 2021 (Line 14)

Services
Preceding station	Shanghai Metro	Following station
Jinqiao Road towards Gangcheng Road	Line 6	Deping Road towards Oriental Sports Center
Xiepu Road towards Fengbang	Line 14	Lantian Road towards Guiqiao Road
Location
- Location within Shanghai

Yunshan Road (simplified Chinese: 云山路; traditional Chinese: 雲山路; pinyin: Yúnshān Lù) is a station on Shanghai Metro Line 6 and Line 14. It began operation on 29 December 2007. It later became an interchange station on 30 December 2021 when Line 14 opened. It is located at the junction of Yunshan Road and Zhangyang Road. Like all other stations on Line 6, it is located in Shanghai's Pudong New Area.

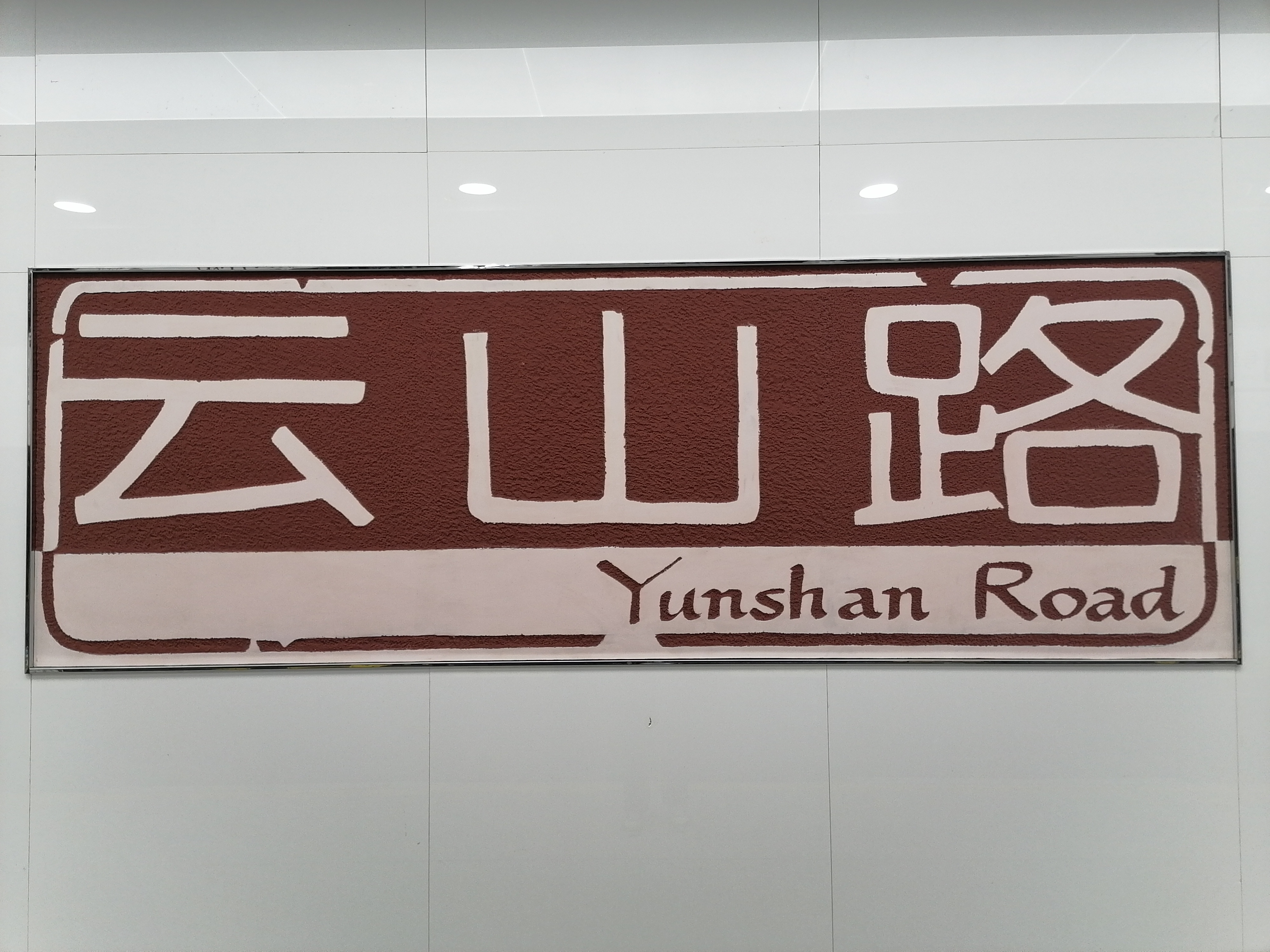
Line 14 station sign

== Station Layout ==
G	Entrances and Exits	Exits 1-8
B1	Line 6 Concourse	Faregates, Station Agent
B2	Line 14 Concourse	Faregates, Station Agent
B2	Side platform, doors open on the right
B2	Northbound	← Line 6 towards Gangcheng Road (Jinqiao Road)
B2	Southbound	Line 6 towards Oriental Sports Center (Deping Road) →
B2	Side platform, doors open on the right
B3	Westbound	← Line 14 towards Fengbang (Xiepu Road)
B3	Island platform, doors open on the left
B3	Eastbound	Line 14 towards Guiqiao Road (Lantian Road) →
