= Jinyue Road station =

Metro station in Shanghai, China

Jinyue Road 金粤路
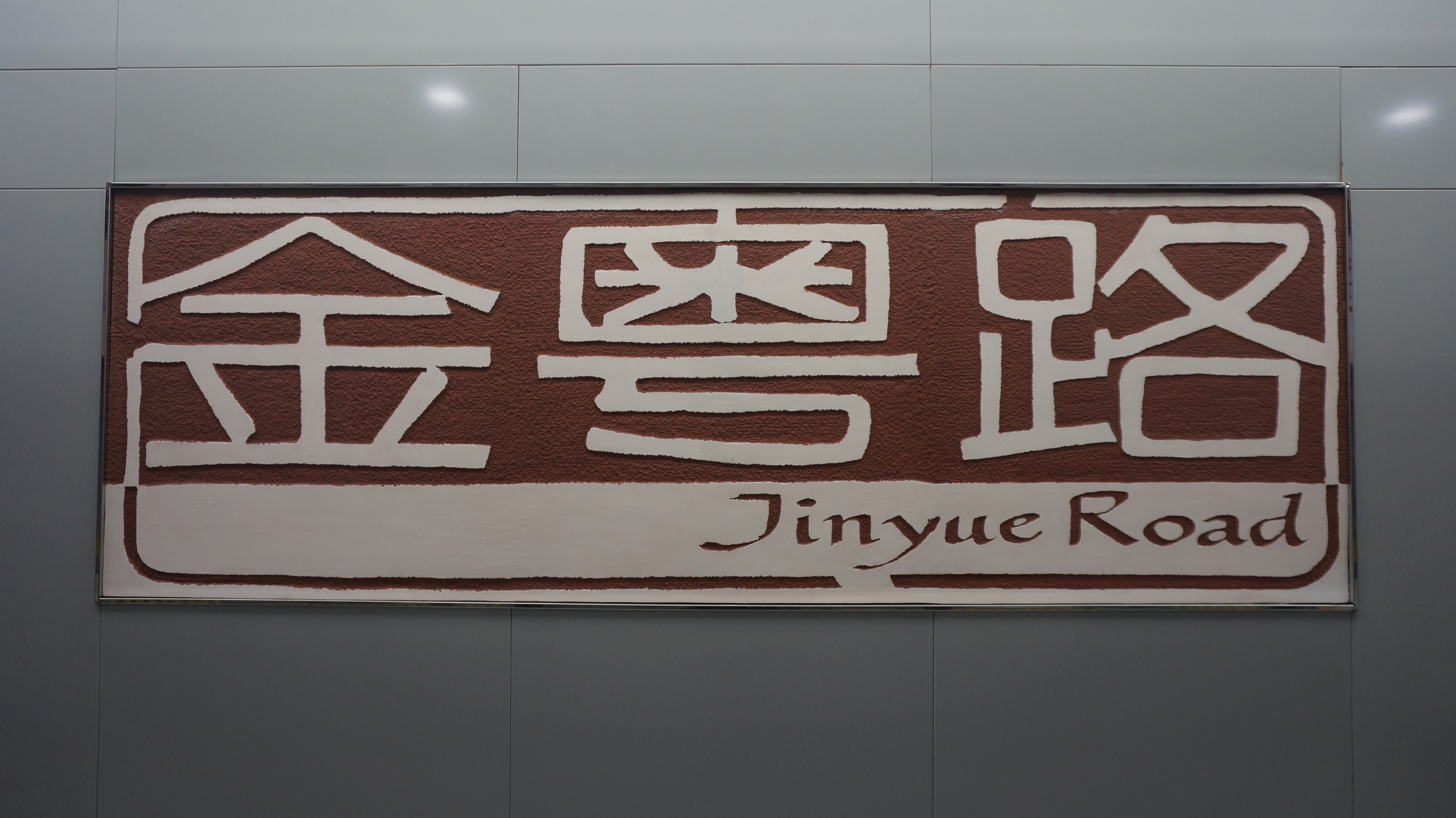
- Station sign

General information
- Location: Jinyue Road and East Jinxiu Road, Pudong, Shanghai; China
- Coordinates: 31.244263°N 121.623761°E
- Line: Line 14
- Platforms: 2 (1 island platform)
- Tracks: 2

Construction
- Structure type: Underground
- Accessible: Yes

History
- Opened: 30 December 2021

Services
Preceding station	Shanghai Metro	Following station
Pudong Football Stadium towards Fengbang	Line 14	Guiqiao Road Terminus
Location

Jinyue Road (Chinese: 金粤路) is a station that is part of Line 14 of the Shanghai Metro. Located at the intersection of Jinyue Road and East Jinxiu Road in Pudong, the station opened with the rest of Line 14 on December 30, 2021.
