= Jiangsu Road station =

Shanghai Metro interchange station

Jiangsu Road 江苏路
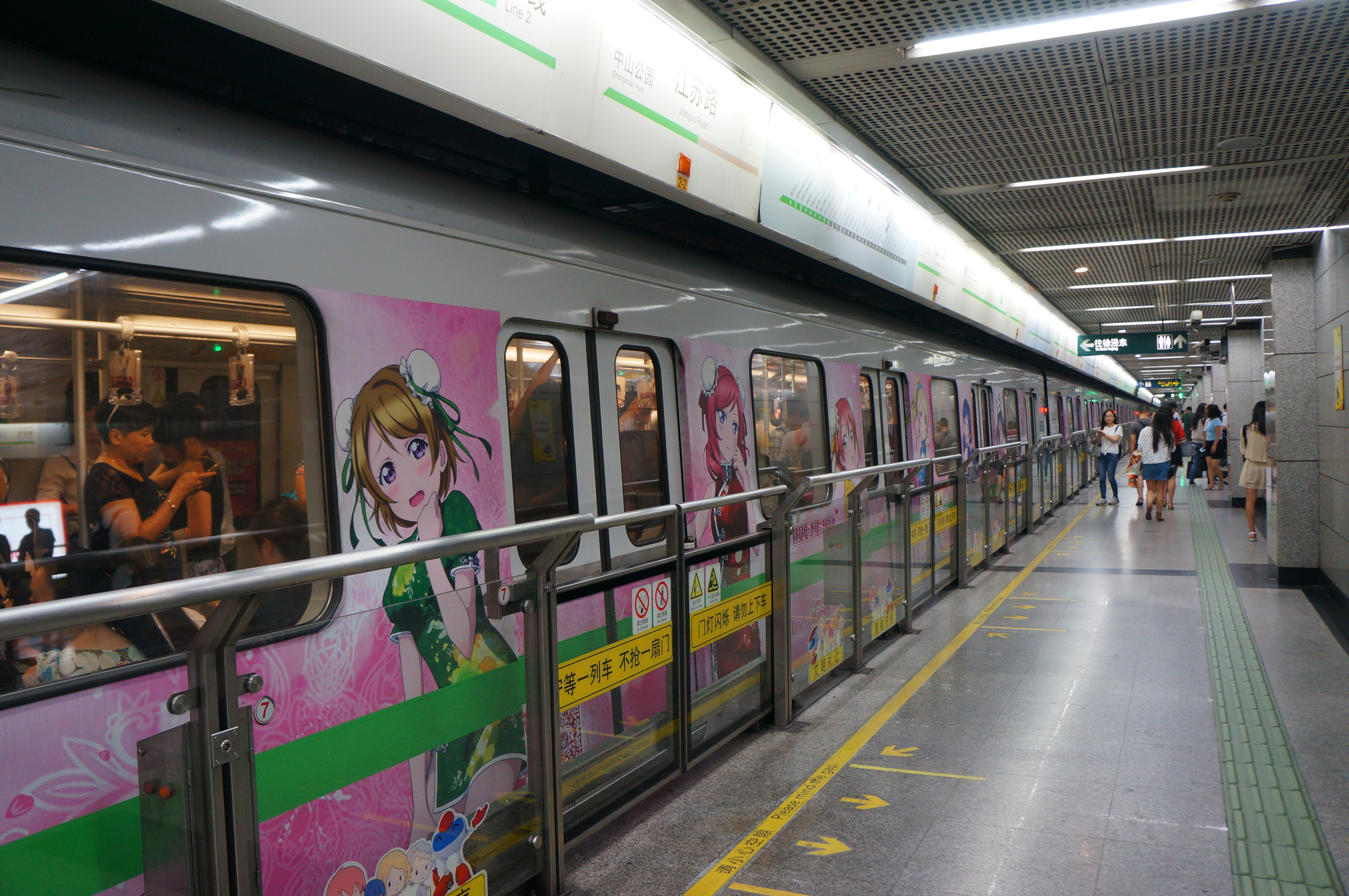
- A National Exhibition and Convention Center -bound Line 2 train with Love Live! livery at Jiangsu Road

General information
- Location: Jiangsu Road and Yuyuan Road; Changning District, Shanghai; China
- Coordinates: 31°13′13″N 121°25′50″E
- Operator: Shanghai No. 2 Metro Operation Co. Ltd.
- Lines: Line 2; Line 11
- Platforms: 4 (2 island platforms)
- Tracks: 4

Construction
- Structure type: Underground
- Accessible: Yes

History
- Opened: 20 September 1999 (Line 2); 31 December 2009 (Line 11)

Services
Preceding station	Shanghai Metro	Following station
Zhongshan Park towards Panxiang Road · Shanghai National Accounting Institute	Line 2	Jing'an Temple towards Pudong Airport Terminal 1&2
Longde Road towards North Jiading or Huaqiao	Line 11	Jiao Tong University towards Disney Resort
Location
- Location within Shanghai

Jiangsu Road (Chinese: 江苏路; pinyin: Jiāngsū Lù) is a station on lines 2 and 11 of the Shanghai Metro. This is one of the stations that can refund the 20RMB deposit for the Shanghai Public Transportation Card.

This station is part of the initial section of Line 2 that opened from Zhongshan Park to Longyang Road that opened on 20 September 1999, and also served as the southeast terminus of Line 11 from the line's opening on the last day of 2009 until 31 August 2013, when the second phase to Luoshan Road opened.

== Station Layout ==
1F	Ground level	Exits
B1	Lines 2 concourse	Tickets, Service Center
B1	Lines 11 upper concourse	Tickets, Service Center, interchange to line 2
B2	Platform 1	← Line 2 towards Panxiang Road · Shanghai National Accounting Institute (Zhongshan Park)
B2	Island platform, doors open on the left
B2	Platform 2	Line 2 towards Pudong Airport Terminal 1&2 (Jing'an Temple) →
B2	Line 11 lower concourse	Tickets, Service Center
B3		← Line 11 towards North Jiading or Huaqiao (Longde Road)
B3	Island platform, doors open on the left
B3		Line 11 towards Disney Resort (Jiao Tong University) →

=== Entrances/exits ===
- 1: Yuyuan Road, Jiangsu Road
- 2: Yuyuan Road, Zhenning Road
- 3: Yuyuan Road, Zhenning Road
- 4: Yuyuan Road, Jiangsu Road
- 5: Jiangsu Road
- 6: Jiangsu Road, Yuyuan Road
- 7: Jiangsu Road, Yuyuan Road
- 8: Jiangsu Road
