= Longde Road station =

Shanghai Metro interchange station

Longde Road 隆德路
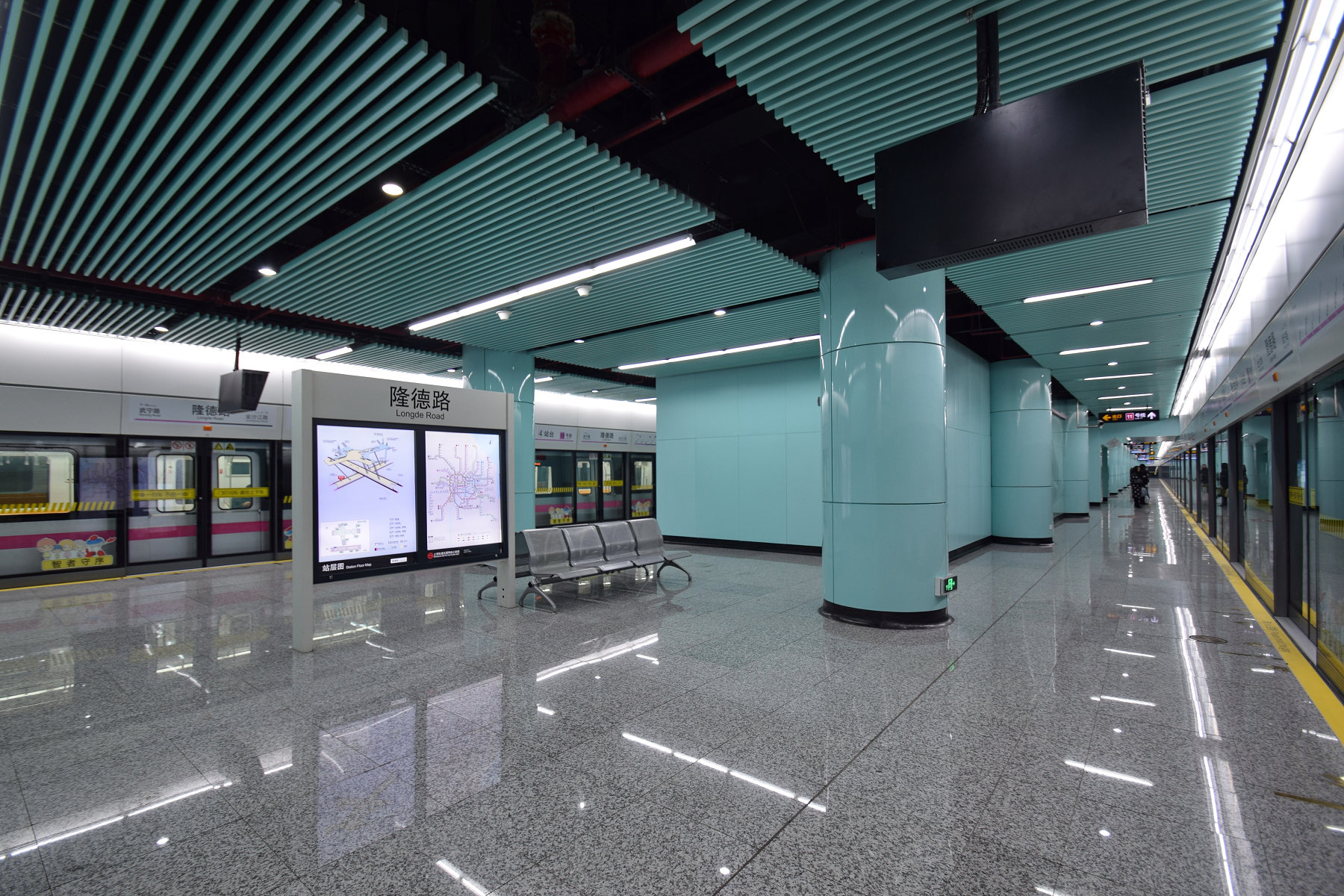
- Line 13 platform

General information
- Location: Caoyang Road and Longde Road (隆德路); Caojiadu, Putuo District, Shanghai; China
- Coordinates: 31°13′47″N 121°25′17″E
- Operator: Shanghai No.2 Metro Operation Co. Ltd.
- Lines: Line 11; Line 13
- Platforms: 4 (2 island platforms)
- Tracks: 4

Construction
- Structure type: Underground
- Accessible: Yes

History
- Opened: 31 December 2009 (Line 11); 28 December 2014 (Line 13)

Services
Preceding station	Shanghai Metro	Following station
Caoyang Road towards North Jiading or Huaqiao	Line 11	Jiangsu Road towards Disney Resort
Jinshajiang Road towards Jinyun Road	Line 13	Wuning Road towards Zhangjiang Road
Location
- Location within Shanghai

Longde Road (Chinese: 隆德路; pinyin: Lóngdé Lù) is the interchange station on Lines 11 and 13 of the Shanghai Metro. The station opened on 31 December 2009 with the opening of line 11. It became an interchange station with line 13 on 28 December 2014.

== Station layout ==
1F	Ground level	Exits
B1	Concourse	Tickets, Service Center
B2	Platform 1	← Line 11 towards North Jiading or Huaqiao (Caoyang Road)
B2	Island platform, doors open on the left
B2	Platform 2	Line 11 towards Disney Resort (Jiangsu Road) →
B3	Platform 3	← Line 13 towards Jinyun Road (Jinshajiang Road)
B3	Island platform, doors open on the left
B3	Platform 4	Line 13 towards Zhangjiang Road (Wuning Road) →

=== Entrances/exits ===
- 1: Caoyang Road
- 2: Guangfu Road (W)
- 3: Caoyang Road
- 4: Caoyang Road, Longde Road
- 5: Caoyang Road, Longde Road
