= Line 14 (Shanghai Metro) =

Line of Shanghai Metro

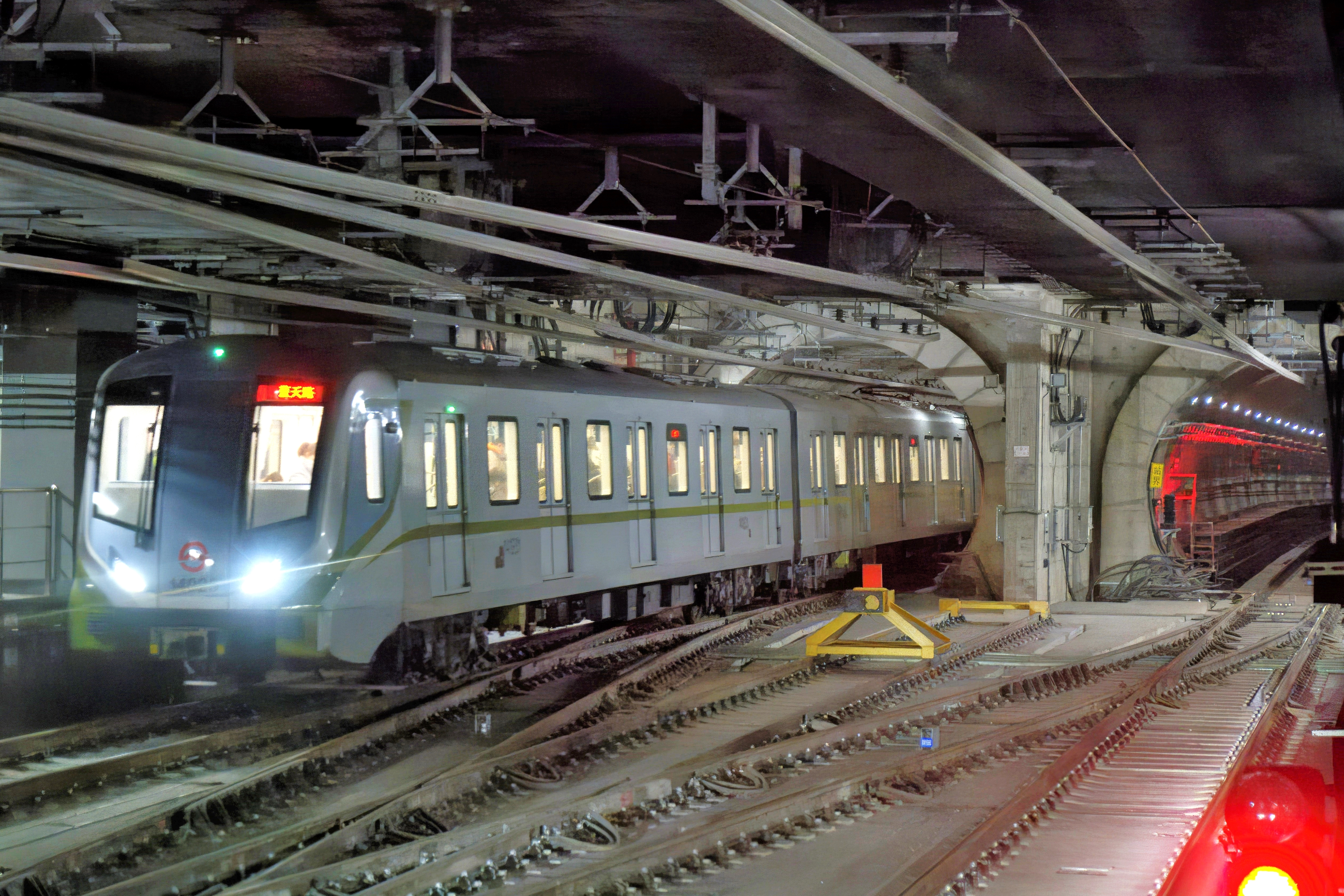
- An 14A01 train at South Huangpi Road station

Overview
- Other name: M6 (planned name)
- Native name: 上海地铁14号线
- Status: Operational
- Owner: Shanghai Rail Transit Line 14 Development Co., Ltd.
- Locale: Pudong, Huangpu, Jing'an, Putuo, and Jiading districts, Shanghai, China
- Termini: Fengbang; Guiqiao Road
- Connecting lines: 1 2 3 4 6 7 8 9 10 11 13 15 18
- Stations: 30 (30 open and 1 under construction)
- Website: www.shmetro.com

Service
- Type: Rapid transit
- System: Shanghai Metro
- Services: Mainline: Fengbang ↔ Guiqiao Road; Partial mainline: Zhenxin Xincun ↔ Lantian Road
- Operator: Shanghai No. 4 Metro Operation Co. Ltd.
- Depot(s): Fengbang Depot; Jinqiao Yard
- Rolling stock: 14A01

History
- Work began: 29 November 2014; 11 years ago
- Opened: 30 December 2021; 4 years ago

Technical
- Track length: 38.18 km (24 mi)
- Number of tracks: 2
- Character: underground
- Track gauge: 1,435 mm (4 ft 8 1/2 in)
- Electrification: Overhead lines (1500 volts)
- Operating speed: 80 km/h (50 mph); Average speed: 34.2 km/h (21 mph)
- Signalling: Thales SEC Transport

Line 14 of the Shanghai Metro is an east-west metro line opened on 30 December 2021. The line, consisting of 31 stations, starts from Fengbang town in Jiading District, and terminate in Jinqiao town in Pudong New Area via Zhenru, Jing'an Temple, Dashijie, and Lujiazui. Its total length is 39.1 kilometres (24.3 mi), and passengers are able to transfer to 13 existing and planned metro lines. Due to Line 14 cutting across some of the densest areas of Shanghai and being a relief line for line 2, high ridership is expected for the line. As such the line uses high capacity 8 car A size trains similar to lines 1 and 2. The line uses an automatic train control system jointly developed by Thales and Shanghai Electric. Line 14 is fully driverless. The line is colored olive on system maps.

== History ==
Environmental evaluations began on 2 January 2014. On 29 November 2014, construction began on a section in Pudong New Area.

The line was originally scheduled to open in 2020, but its opening was delayed to 30 December 2021. Longju Road station has not been opened yet, due to problems with land acquisition process.

Shanghai Metro Line 14 opening history
Segment	Commenced	Opened	Length	Station(s)	Name	Investment
Fengbang - Guiqiao Road	29 Nov 2014	30 Dec 2021	38.2 km (23.7 mi)	30	Phase 1	¥57.686 billion
Longju Road	29 Nov 2014	TBD	Infill station	1	Phase 1	¥57.686 billion

== Stations ==
=== Service routes ===
Shanghai Metro Line 14 service routes
M - Mainline: Fengbang ↔ Guiqiao Road; P - Partial mainline: Zhenxin Xincun ↔ Lantian Road
Routes		Station name		Connections	Distance			Location	Open- ing
M	P	English	Chinese	Connections	km		min	Location	Open- ing
●		Fengbang	封浜		0.0	0.0	0	Jiading	30 Dec 2021
●		Lexiu Road	乐秀路		1.61	1.61	2	Jiading	30 Dec 2021
●		Lintao Road	临洮路		1.65	3.26	4	Jiading	30 Dec 2021
●		Jiayi Road	嘉怡路		1.55	4.81	7	Jiading	30 Dec 2021
●		Dingbian Road	定边路		1.41	6.22	9	Jiading	30 Dec 2021
●	●	Zhenxin Xincun	真新新村		1.24	7.46	11	Jiading	30 Dec 2021
●	●	Zhenguang Road	真光路		1.00	8.46	13	Putuo	30 Dec 2021
●	●	Tongchuan Road	铜川路	15	1.31	9.77	15	Putuo	30 Dec 2021
●	●	Zhenru	真如	11	0.92	10.69	17	Putuo	30 Dec 2021
●	●	Zhongning Road	中宁路		0.90	11.59	20	Putuo	30 Dec 2021
●	●	Caoyang Road	曹杨路	3 4 11 (Note: Virtual transfer with lines 3, 4, and 11 – passengers who hold the Shanghai Public Transportation Card and transfer within 30 minutes of exiting the station are able to transfer to other lines without exiting the system.)	1.10	12.69	22	Putuo	30 Dec 2021
●	●	Wuning Road	武宁路	13	1.05	13.74	24	Putuo	30 Dec 2021
●	●	Wuding Road	武定路		0.97	14.71	26	Jing'an	30 Dec 2021
●	●	Jing'an Temple	静安寺	2 7	1.03	15.74	28	Jing'an	30 Dec 2021
●	●	Site of the First CPC National Congress · South Huangpi Road	一大会址·黄陂南路	1	3.07	18.81	32	Huangpu	30 Dec 2021
●	●	Dashijie	大世界	8	0.71	19.52	34	Huangpu	30 Dec 2021
●	●	Yuyuan Garden	豫园	10	0.74	20.26	36	Huangpu	30 Dec 2021
●	●	Lujiazui	陆家嘴	2	1.60	21.86	39	Pudong	30 Dec 2021
●	●	South Pudong Road	浦东南路	2 (Note: The station name of line 2 was Dongchang Road (东昌路). Although it's de facto defined as out-of-system transfer station, virtual transfer via cards isn't available until open of the station of line 19, but after that day, the in-system transfer will be implemented instead.)	1.01	22.87	41	Pudong	30 Dec 2021
●	●	Pudong Avenue	浦东大道	4	0.74	23.61	43	Pudong	30 Dec 2021
●	●	Yuanshen Road	源深路		1.05	24.66	45	Pudong	30 Dec 2021
●	●	Changyi Road	昌邑路	18	1.06	25.72	47	Pudong	30 Dec 2021
●	●	Xiepu Road	歇浦路		1.23	26.95	49	Pudong	30 Dec 2021
｜	｜	Longju Road	龙居路		1.02	27.97		Pudong	Later opening due to land acquisition process
●	●	Yunshan Road	云山路	6	2.05	30.02	53	Pudong	30 Dec 2021
●	●	Lantian Road	蓝天路	9	1.16	31.18	56	Pudong	30 Dec 2021
●		Huangyang Road	黄杨路		1.86	33.04	58	Pudong	30 Dec 2021
●		Yunshun Road	云顺路		0.88	33.92	60	Pudong	30 Dec 2021
●		Pudong Football Stadium	浦东足球场		1.49	35.41	63	Pudong	30 Dec 2021
●		Jinyue Road	金粤路		1.28	36.69	65	Pudong	30 Dec 2021
●		Guiqiao Road	桂桥路		1.49	38.18	67	Pudong	30 Dec 2021

== Headways ==
Shanghai Metro Line 14 headway
Time		Fengbang - Zhenxin Xincun	Zhenxin Xincun - Lantian Road	Lantian Road - Guiqiao Road
Monday - Friday (Working Days)
AM peak	7:00–9:20	About 6 min and 40 sec	About 3 min and 20 sec	About 6 min and 40 sec
Off-peak	9:20–16:40	About 12 min	About 6 min	About 12 min
PM peak	16:40–20:00	About 8 min	About 4 min	About 8 min
Other hours	Before 7:20 After 19:00	About 5-12 min
Saturday and Sunday (Weekends)
Peak	7:00–21:00	About 10 min	About 5 min	About 10 min
Other hours	Before 7:00 After 21:00	About 5-12 min

=== Rolling stock ===
Shanghai Metro Line 14 rolling stock
Fleet numbers	Manufacturer	Time of manufac- turing	Class	No of car	Assembly (Note: Tc: Trailer with cab; Mp: EMU with pantograph; M: EMU without pantograph.)	Rolling stock	Number	Notes
392	CRRC Nanjing Puzhen Co., Ltd.	2019–2020	A (Note: Class A carriage: 21-24m in length, 3.0m in width and 3.8m in height; Capacity: about 310 people.)	8	Tc+Mp+M+Mp+M+M+Mp+Tc	14A01	14001-14049 (140011-143921)
