= Fengbang station =

Station of Shanghai Metro

Fengbang 封浜
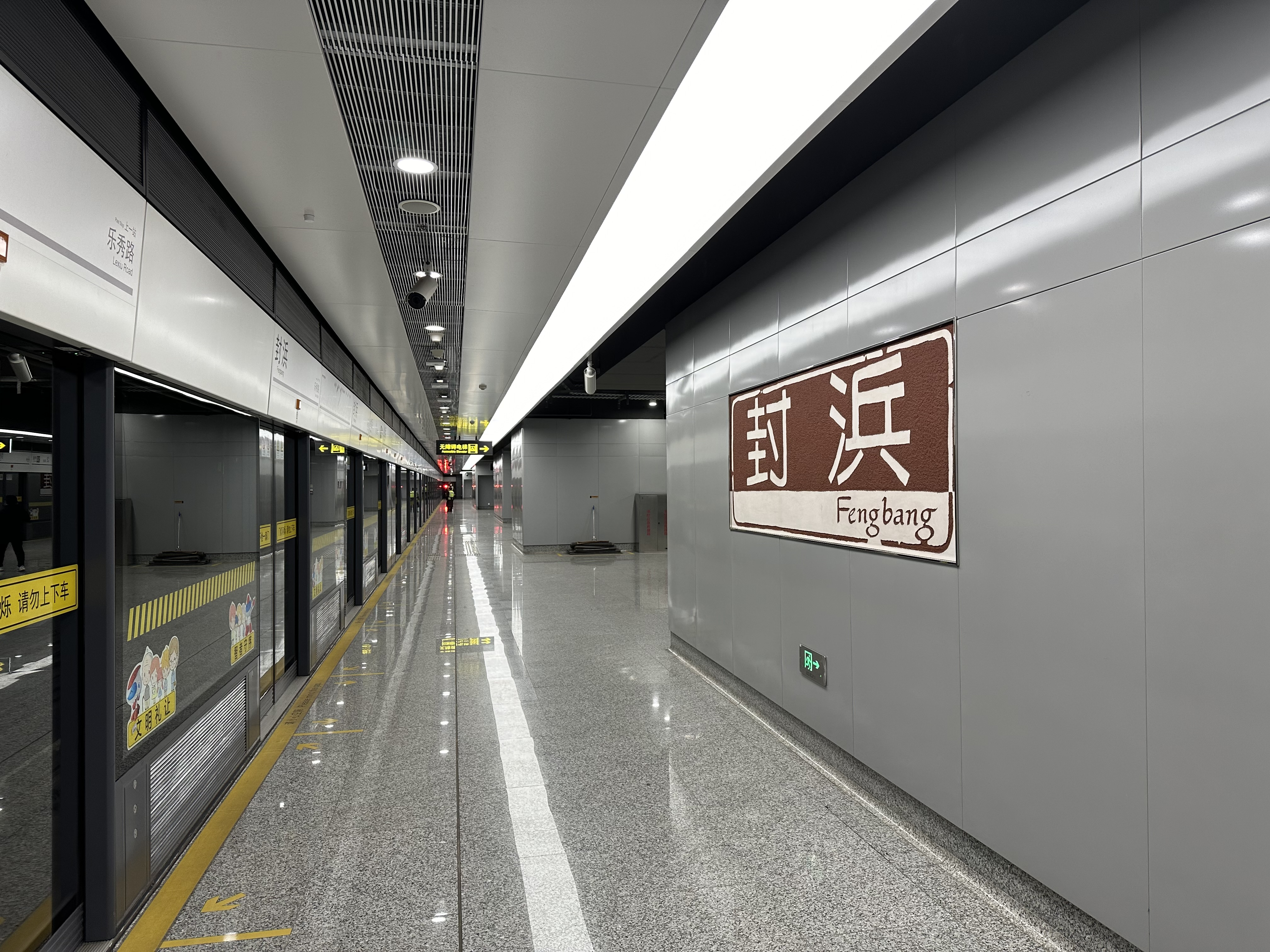
- Station platform

General information
- Location: Xiangfeng Road and Cao'an Highway, Fengbang, Jiading District, Shanghai; China
- Coordinates: 31.269679°N 121.291580°E
- Line: Line 14
- Platforms: 2 (1 island platform)
- Tracks: 2

Construction
- Structure type: Underground
- Accessible: Yes

History
- Opened: 30 December 2021

Services
Preceding station	Shanghai Metro	Following station
Terminus	Line 14	Lexiu Road towards Guiqiao Road
Location

Fengbang (Chinese: 封浜) is a station that is part of Line 14 of the Shanghai Metro. Located at the intersection of Xiangfeng Road and Cao'an Highway in the city's Jiading District, the station is named after the nearby town of Fengbang and serves as the western terminus of the line when it opened on December 30, 2021.
