= Guiqiao Road station =

Metro station in Shanghai, China

Guiqiao Road 桂桥路
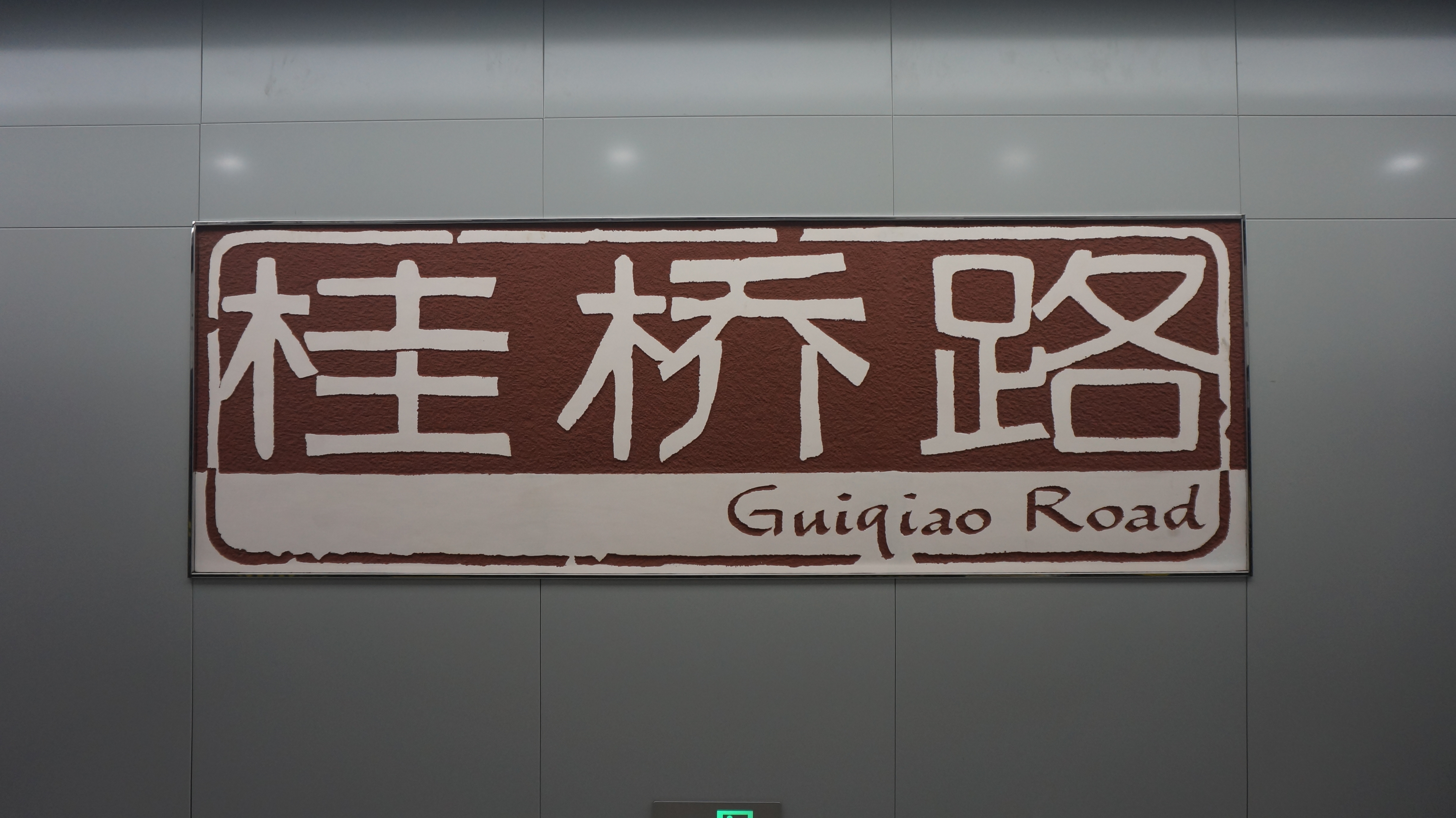
- The station name wall

General information
- Other names: Jinsui Road
- Location: Jinsui Road and Chuanqiao Road, Pudong, Shanghai; China
- Coordinates: 31.254027°N 121.630789°E
- Line: Line 14
- Platforms: 2 (1 island platform)
- Tracks: 2

Construction
- Structure type: Underground
- Accessible: Yes

History
- Opened: 30 December 2021

Services
Preceding station	Shanghai Metro	Following station
Jinyue Road towards Fengbang	Line 14	Terminus
Location

Guiqiao Road (Chinese: 桂桥路) is a station that is part of Line 14 of the Shanghai Metro. Located at the intersection of Jinsui Road and Chuanqiao Road in Pudong, the station serves as the eastern terminus of the line and it opened with the rest of Line 14 on December 30, 2021. Previously, this station was given the name Jinsui Road.
