= Line 21 (Shanghai Metro) =

Planned metro line in Shanghai, China

Overview
- Other name(s): Line 24 (between 2014 and 2016)
- Native name: 上海地铁21号线
- Status: Under construction
- Locale: Pudong, Shanghai
- Termini: Dongjing Road; Shanghai East railway station
- Connecting lines: 2 6 9 11 12 13 14
- Stations: 23
- Website: www.shmetro.com

Service
- Type: Rapid transit
- System: Shanghai Metro
- Operator(s): Shanghai Maglev Development Co., Ltd.
- Depot: Liuchen Road Depot
- Rolling stock: Class A 6-car trains

History
- Commenced: January 4, 2022; 4 years ago
- Planned opening: 2027; 1 year's time

Technical
- Track length: 48 km (30 mi)
- Number of tracks: 2
- Track gauge: 1,435 mm (4 ft 8 1/2 in)
- Electrification: Overhead lines (1500 volts)
- Operating speed: 100 km/h (62 mph)

Line 21 will be a future subway line on the Shanghai Metro. It will run in a north–south direction through Pudong, connecting Gaohang in Waigaoqiao to the Disney Resort. The first phase will be about 28 km (17 mi) long with 10 stations. Stations will have passing loops to allow for express and local stopping patterns.

The line was announced by the Municipal government in 2016. Previous plans in 2014 designated the Disney Resort — Guanglan Road section as Line 24.

== History ==
Shanghai metro line 21 opening history
Segment	Commenced	Opened	Length	Station(s)	Name	Investment
Dongjing Road - Chuansha Road	4 Jan 2022	exp 2027	27.964 km (17.4 mi)	18	Phase 1	36.956 billion yuan
Chuansha Road - Shanghai East Railway Station	end-2023	exp 2027	14 km (8.7 mi)	4	Phase 1 East extension
Shanghai East Railway Station - Pudong Airport T3 Terminal	end-2023	exp 2028	2 km (1.2 mi)	1	Phase 1 East extension
Dongjing Road - ?		planned			Phase 2

== Stations ==
=== Service routes ===
Shanghai metro line 21 service routes
L - Local: Dongjing Road ↔ Pudong Airport T3 Terminal; R - Rapid: Dongjing Road ↔ Pudong Airport T3 Terminal
Routes		Station name		Connections	Distance		Location	Open- ing
L	R	English	Chinese	Connections	km	min	Location	Open- ing
●	●	Dongjing Road	东靖路	6	0.0		Pudong	Phase I 2027
●	●	North Yanggao Road	杨高北路	12			Pudong	Phase I 2027
●	｜	Jialin Road	佳林路				Pudong	Phase I 2027
●	●	Jinqiao	金桥	9			Pudong	Phase I 2027
●	｜	Yunqiao Road	云桥路				Pudong	Phase I 2027
●	●	Pudong Football Stadium	浦东足球场	14			Pudong	Phase I 2027
●	｜	Longdong Avenue	龙东大道				Pudong	Phase I 2027
●	●	Guanglan Road	广兰路	2			Pudong	Phase I 2027
●	｜	South Gudong Road	古桐南路				Pudong	Phase I 2027
●	｜	Zhangheng Road	张衡路				Pudong	Phase I 2027
●	●	Xuelin Road	学林路	13			Pudong	Phase I 2027
●	｜	Boning Road	博宇路				Pudong	Phase I 2027
●	｜	Kangnan Road	康南路				Pudong	Phase I 2027
●	●	East Kangqiao	康桥东	Airport Link			Pudong	Phase I 2027
●	｜	South Shenjiang Road	申江南路				Pudong	Phase I 2027
●	●	Disney Resort	迪士尼	11			Pudong	Phase I 2027
●	｜	Tanghuang Road	唐黄路				Pudong	Phase I 2027
●	｜	Chuansha Road	川沙路		28		Pudong	Phase I 2027
●	｜	Shixin Road	施新路				Pudong	Phase 1 East extension 2027
●	｜	Wenju Road	闻居路				Pudong	Phase 1 East extension 2027
●	｜	Jinwen Road	金闻路				Pudong	Phase 1 East extension 2027
●	●	Shanghai East railway station	上海东站	Airport Link Nanhui (both u/c) East West Link (planned) (u/c)			Pudong	Phase 1 East extension 2027
●	●	Pudong Airport Terminal 3	浦东机场T3航站楼	2 Maglev; Airport Link Nanhui (both u/c)	44		Pudong	Phase I East extension 2028

=== Important stations ===
The line will interchange with various lines in Pudong at the following stations:

- Dongjing Road (Line 6)
- North Yanggao Road (Line 12)
- Guanglan Road (Line 2)
- Zhangjiang Road (Line 13)
- Disney Resort (Line 11)
