= West Gaoke Road station =

Shanghai Metro interchange station

West Gaoke Road 高科西路
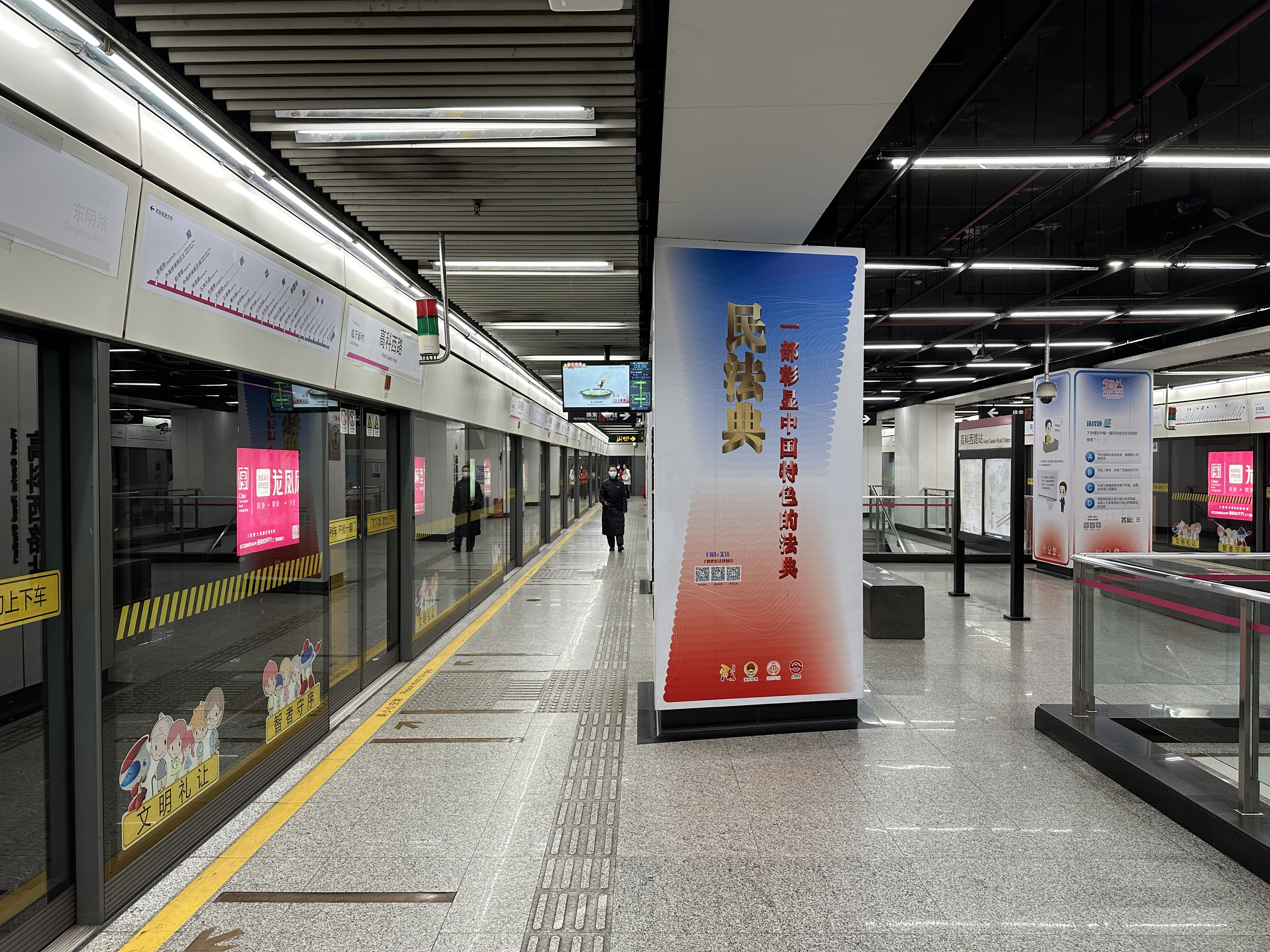
- Line 6 platform

General information
- Location: West Gaoke Road, Pudong, Shanghai; China
- Coordinates: 31.1872°N 121.505°E
- Operator: Shanghai No. 3/4 Metro Operation Co. Ltd.
- Lines: Line 6; Line 7
- Platforms: 4 (2 island platforms)
- Tracks: 4

Construction
- Structure type: Underground
- Accessible: Yes

History
- Opened: 29 December 2007 (Line 6); 5 December 2009 (Line 7)

Services
| Preceding station | Shanghai Metro | Following station |
|---|---|---|
| Linyi Xincun towards Gangcheng Road | Line 6 | Dongming Road towards Oriental Sports Center |
| Yuntai Road towards Meilan Lake | Line 7 | South Yanggao Road towards Huamu Road |
Location
- Location within Shanghai

West Gaoke Road station
- Chinese: 高科西路
- Literal meaning: West High-Tech Road
Transcriptions
Standard Mandarin
- Hanyu Pinyin: Gāokē xī lù
- Wade–Giles: Kao-k‘o Hsi Lu

West Gaoke Road is an interchange station between Lines 6 and 7 of the Shanghai Metro. It began operation on 29 December 2007 with the opening of line 6 and became an interchange station with line 7 on 5 December 2009.

== Station Layout ==
| G | Entrances and Exits | Exits 1-4 |
| B1 | Concourse | Faregates, Station Agent |
| B2 | Northbound | ← Line 6 towards Gangcheng Road (Linyi Xincun) |
| B2 | Island platform, doors open on the left |
| B2 | Southbound | Line 6 towards Oriental Sports Center (Dongming Road) → |
| B3 | Northbound | ← Line 7 towards Meilan Lake (Yuntai Road) |
| B3 | Island platform, doors open on the left |
| B3 | Southbound | Line 7 towards Huamu Road (South Yanggao Road) → |

== See also ==
- Zhangjiang Hi-Tech Park, for which the road is named
