= Dongming Road station =

Shanghai Metro station

Dongming Road 东明路
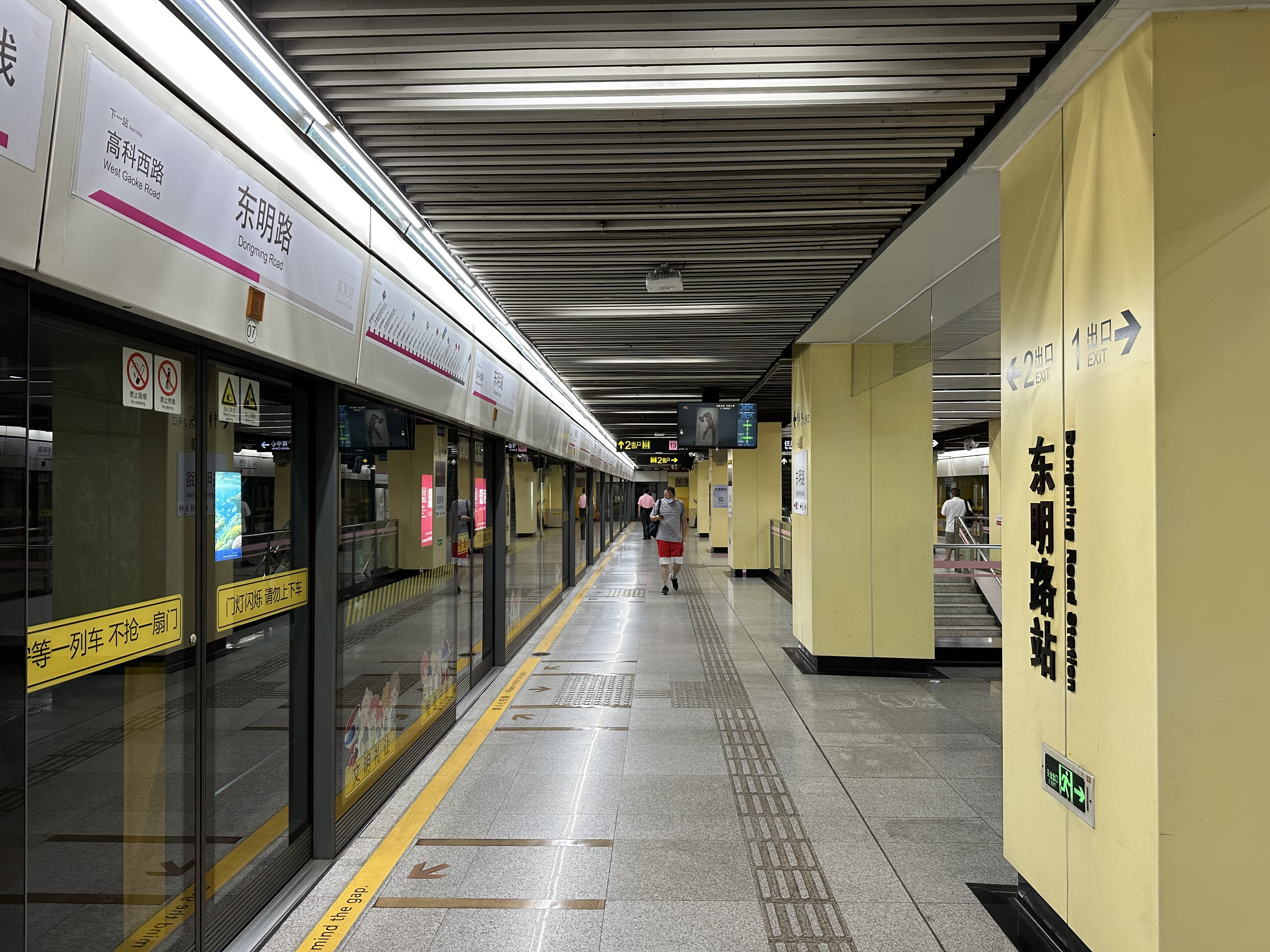
- Line 6 platform

General information
- Location: Chengshan Road (成山路), Dongming Road (东明路); Pudong, Shanghai; China
- Coordinates: 31°10′30″N 121°30′22″E
- Operator: Shanghai No. 4 Metro Operation Co. Ltd. (Line 6); Shanghai No. 2 Metro Operation Co. Ltd. (Line 13)
- Lines: Line 6; Line 13
- Platforms: 4 (2 island platforms)
- Tracks: 4

Construction
- Structure type: Underground
- Accessible: Yes

History
- Opened: 29 December 2007 (line 6); 30 December 2018 (line 13)

Services
| Preceding station | Shanghai Metro | Following station |
|---|---|---|
| West Gaoke Road towards Gangcheng Road | Line 6 | Gaoqing Road towards Oriental Sports Center |
| Chengshan Road towards Jinyun Road | Line 13 | Huapeng Road towards Zhangjiang Road |
Location
- Location within Shanghai

Dongming Road (simplified Chinese: 东明路; traditional Chinese: 東明路; pinyin: Dōngmíng Lù) is an interchange station on Lines 6 and 13 of the Shanghai Metro. It began services on 29 December 2007 as a Line 6 station. It became an interchange station on 30 December 2018 with the arrival of Line 13 as part of its phase two and three extensions.

== Station layout ==
The station has two concourses. North concourse links to lines 6 and 13, and the south concourse only links to line 6.

| 1F | Ground level | Exits |
| B1 | North concourse | Tickets, Service Center |
| B1 | South concourse | Underground metro mall |
| B2 | | ← Line 6 towards Gangcheng Road (West Gaoke Road) |
| B2 | Island platform, doors open on the left |
| B2 | | Line 6 towards Oriental Sports Center (Gaoqing Road) → |
| B3 | Platform 3 | ← Line 13 towards Jinyun Road (Chengshan Road) |
| B3 | Island platform, doors open on the left |
| B3 | Platform 4 | Line 13 towards Zhangjiang Road (Huapeng Road) → |

=== Entrances/exits ===
- 1: Dongming Road, Chengshan Road
- 2: Dongming Road, Chengshan Road
- 3: Chengshan Road, Dongming Road
- 4: Chengshan Road, Zouping Road
- 5: Chengshan Road, Zouping Road
- 6: Chengshan Road

== Gallery ==
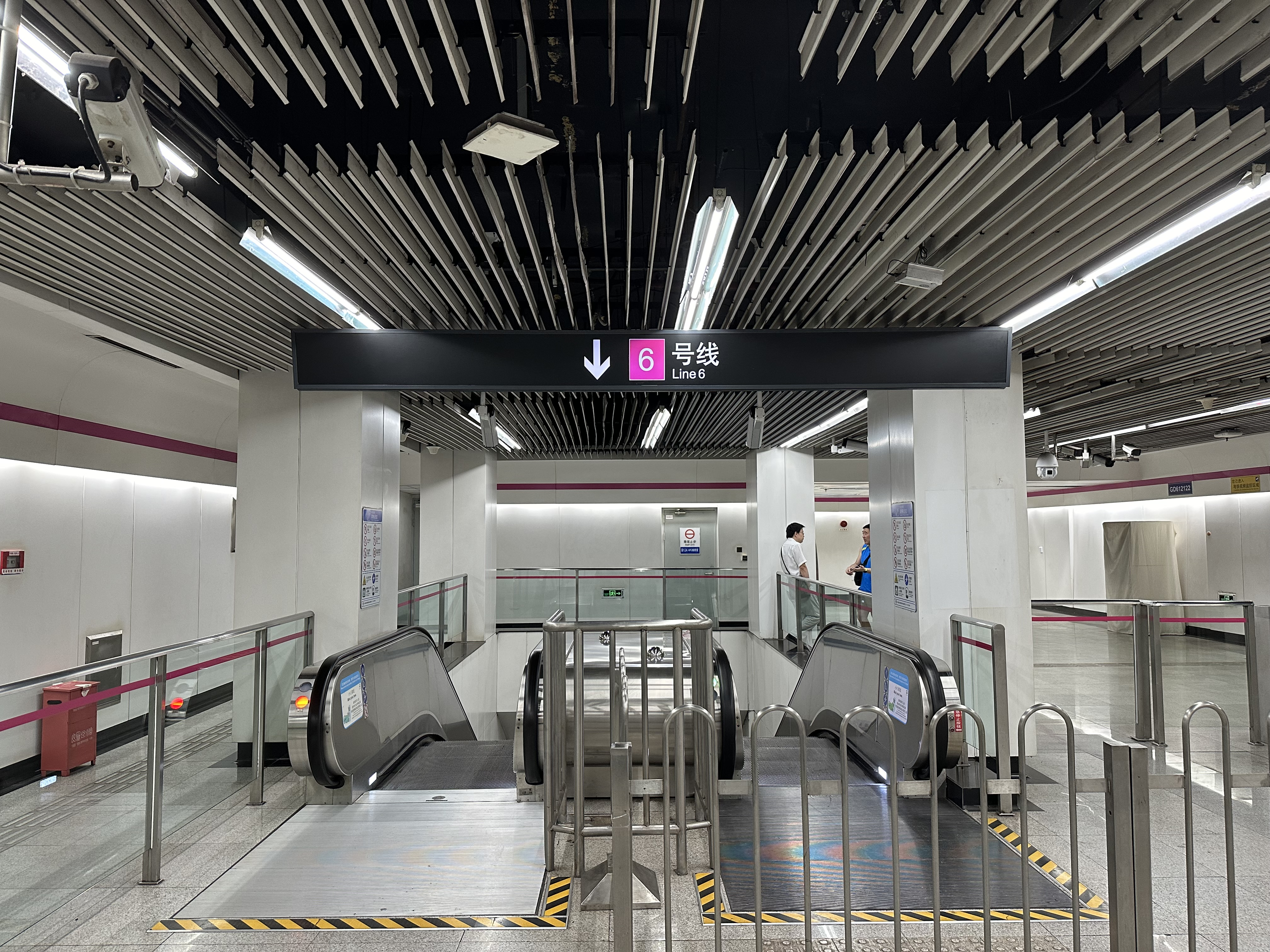
Line 6 north concourse

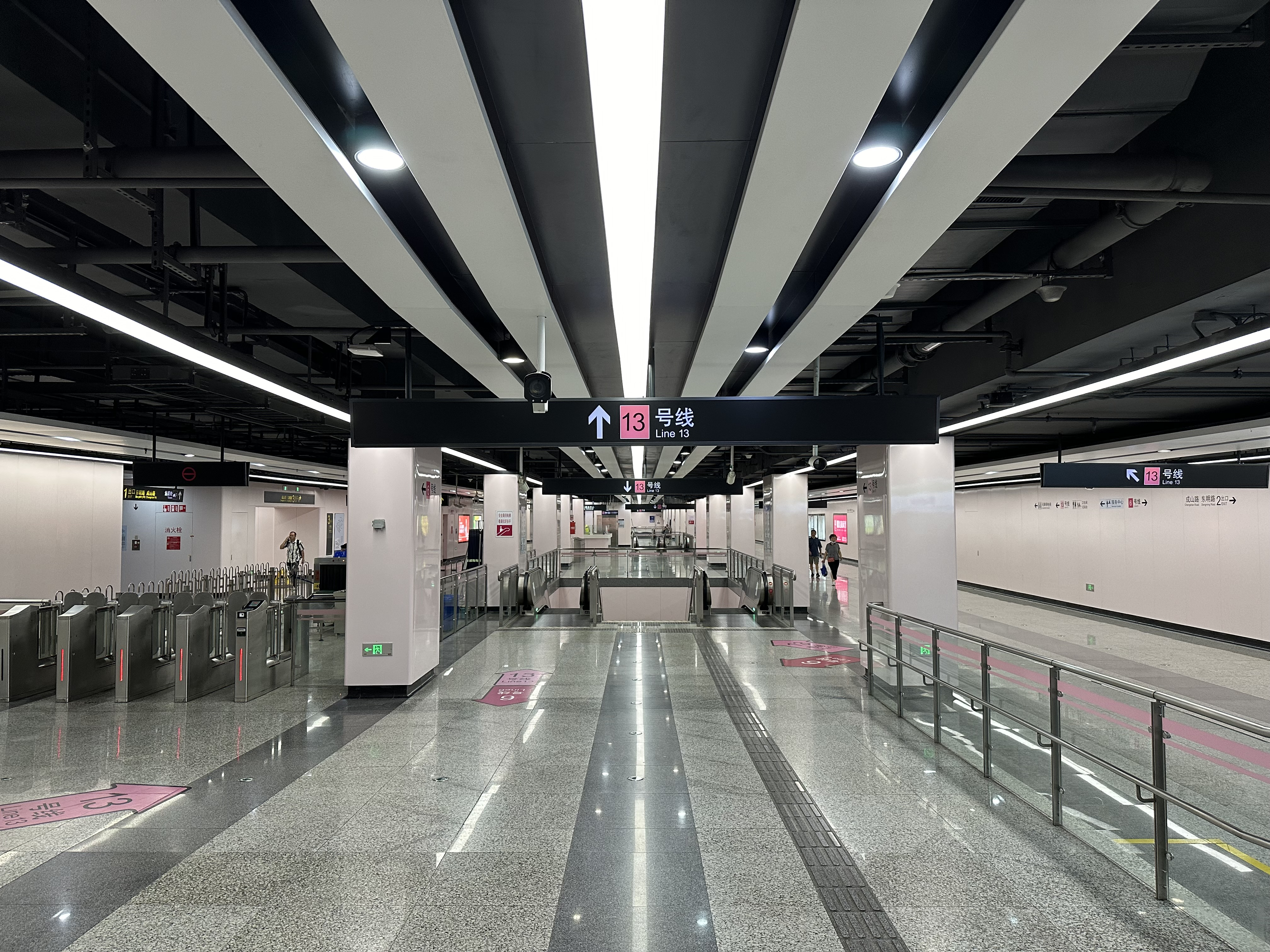
Line 13 concourse

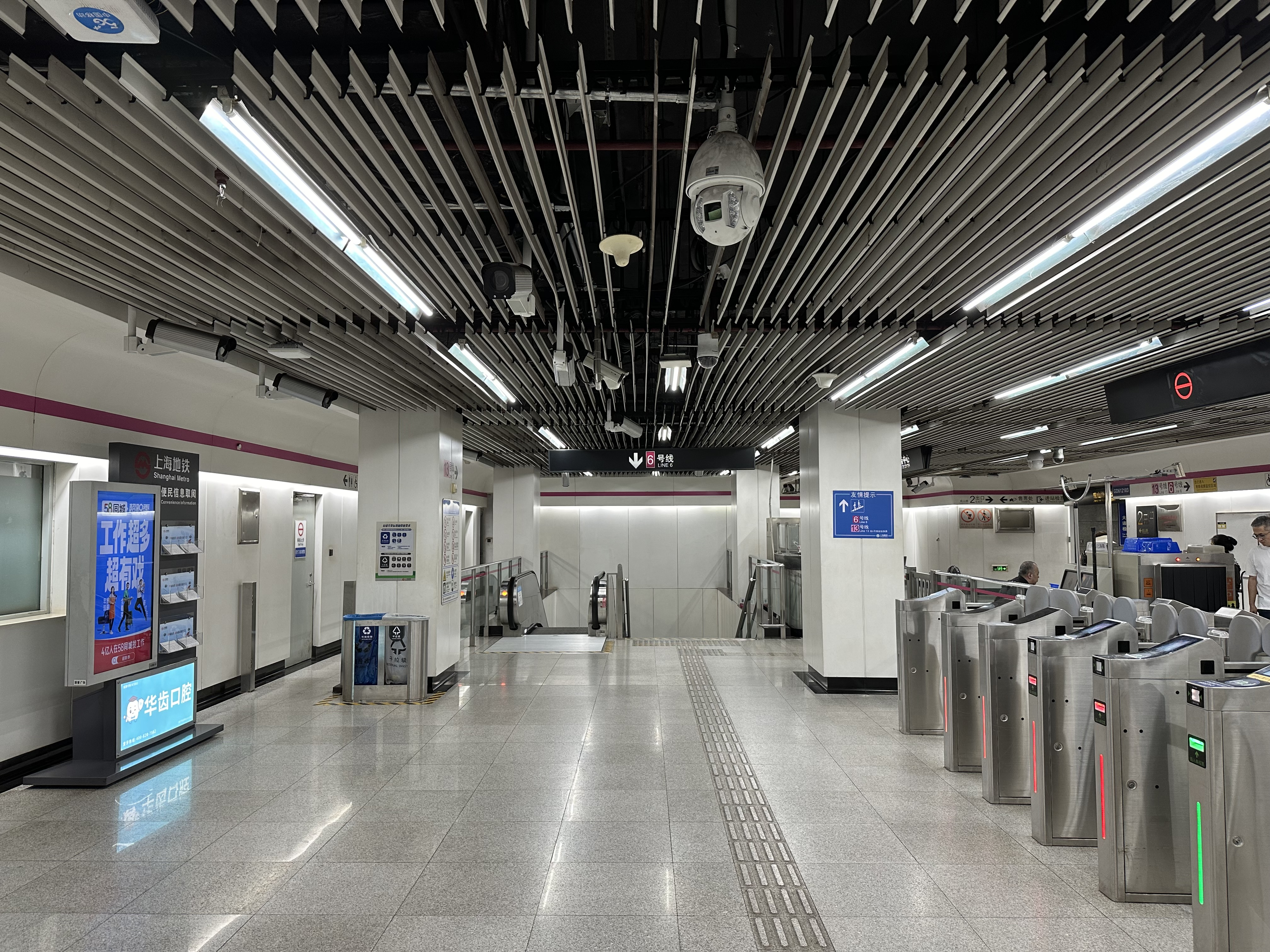
Line 6 south concourse

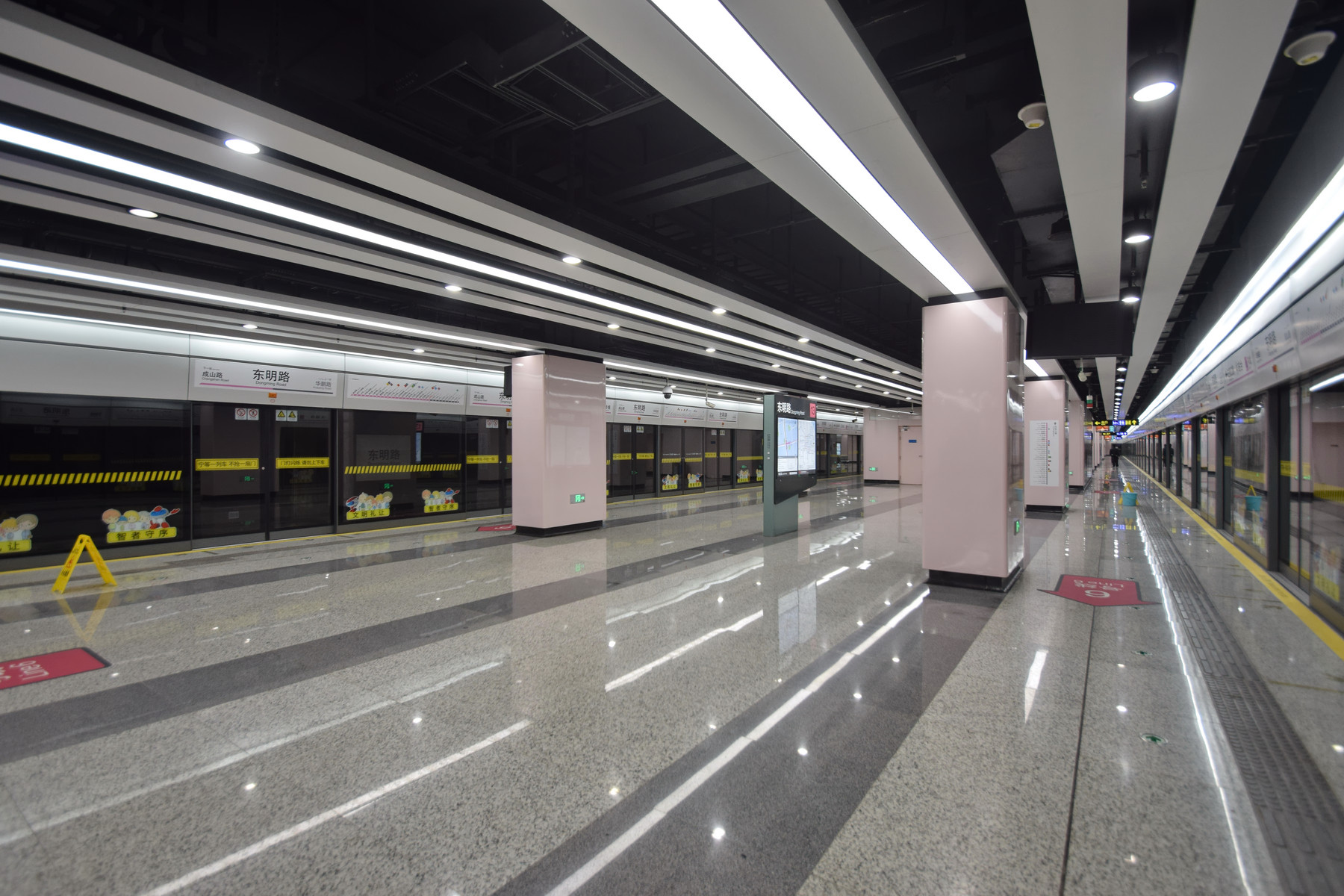
Line 13 platform
