= Lancun Road station =

Shanghai Metro interchange station

Lancun Road 蓝村路
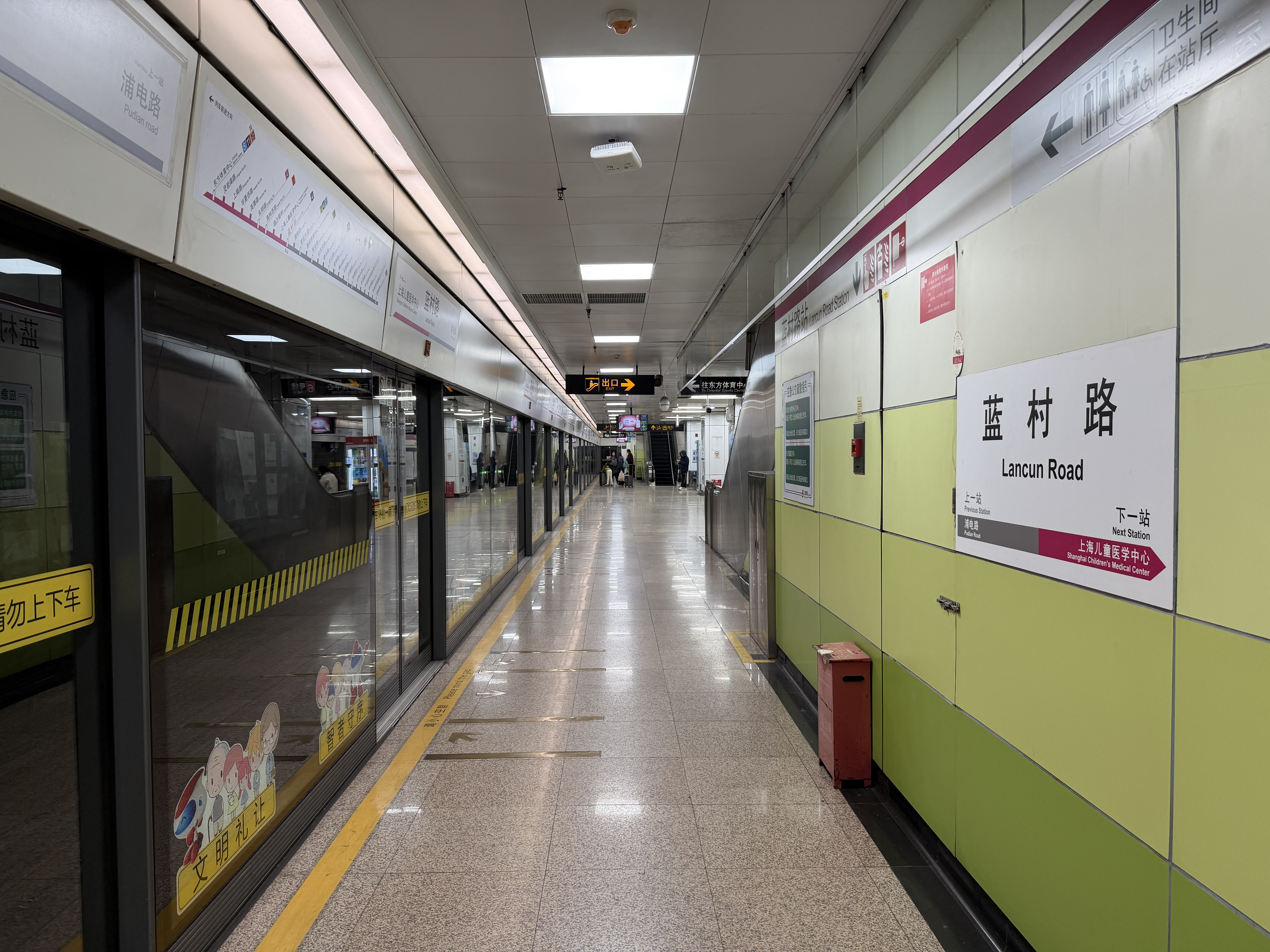
- Line 6 platform

General information
- Location: Dongfang Road and Lancun Road; Pudong, Shanghai; China
- Coordinates: 31°12′42″N 121°31′39″E
- Operator: Shanghai No. 3/4 Metro Operation Co. Ltd.
- Lines: Line 4; Line 6
- Platforms: 4 (2 island platforms)
- Tracks: 4

Construction
- Structure type: Underground
- Accessible: Yes

History
- Opened: 31 December 2005; 20 years ago (Line 4); 29 December 2007; 18 years ago (Line 6)

Services
Preceding station	Shanghai Metro	Following station
Tangqiao Clockwise	Line 4	Xiangcheng Road Counter-clockwise
Pudian Road towards Gangcheng Road	Line 6	Shanghai Children's Medical Center towards Oriental Sports Center
Location
- Location within Shanghai

Lancun Road (simplified Chinese: 蓝村路; traditional Chinese: 藍村路; pinyin: Láncūn Lù) is an interchange station between Lines 4 and 6 on the Shanghai Metro, located in the Pudong New Area. Service began on Line 4 at this station on 31 December 2005, while the interchange with Line 6 opened with most of the rest of that line on 29 December 2007. Between 31 December 2005 and 29 December 2007 this station served as the eastern terminus of Line 4 before the remaining section of the loop between here and Damuqiao Road opened on 29 December 2007.

== Station Layout ==
G	Entrances and Exits	Exits 1-3
G	Line 4 Concourse	Faregates, Station Agent
M	Interchange Corridor
B1	Line 6 Concourse	Faregates, Station Agent
B1	Counterclockwise	← Line 4 to Xiangcheng Road
B1	Island platform, doors open on the left
B1	Clockwise	Line 4 to Tangqiao →
B2	Northbound	← Line 6 towards Gangcheng Road (Pudian Road)
B2	Island platform, doors open on the left
B2	Southbound	Line 6 towards Oriental Sports Center (Shanghai Children's Medical Center) →

== Gallery ==
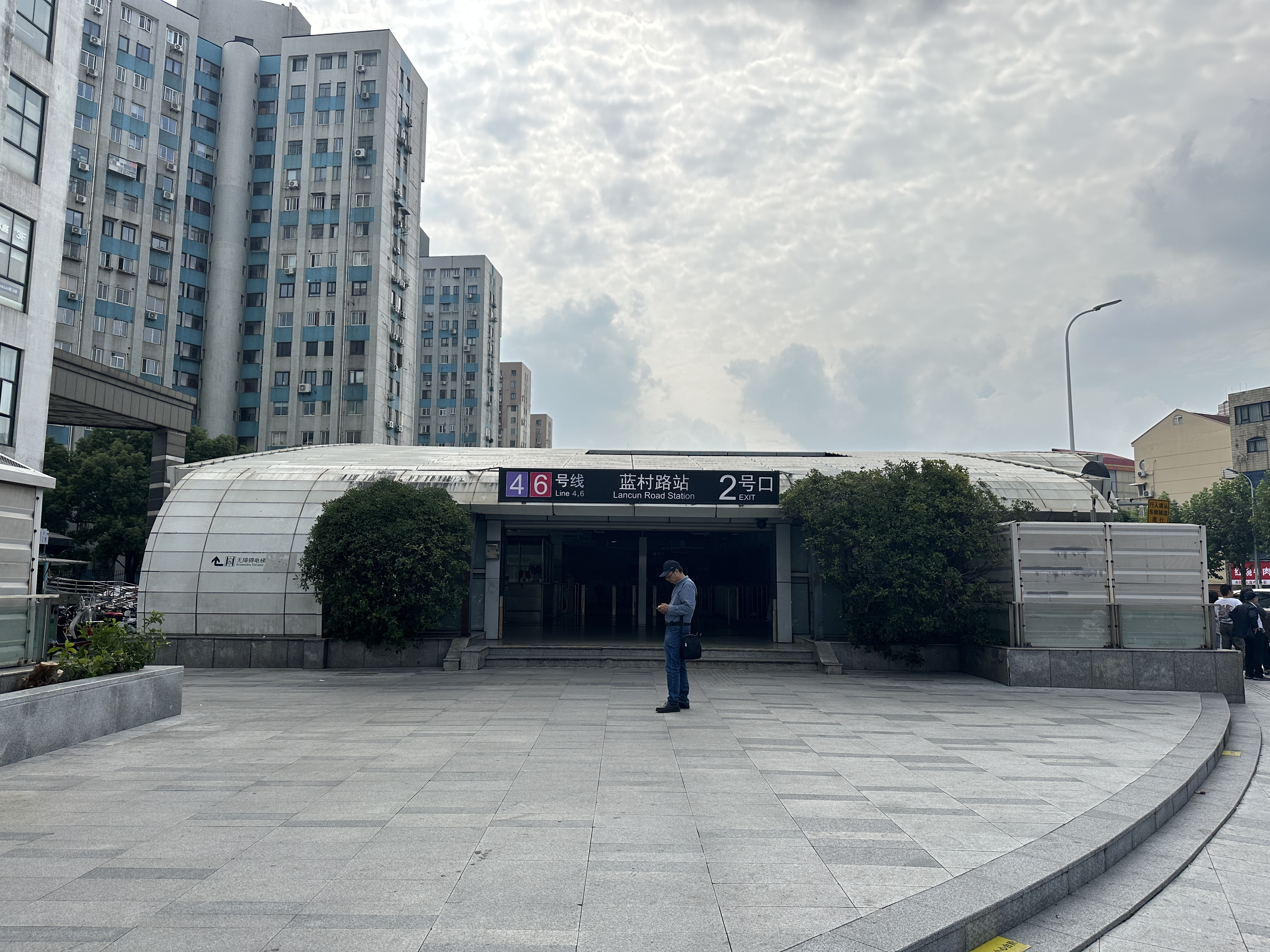
Exit 2

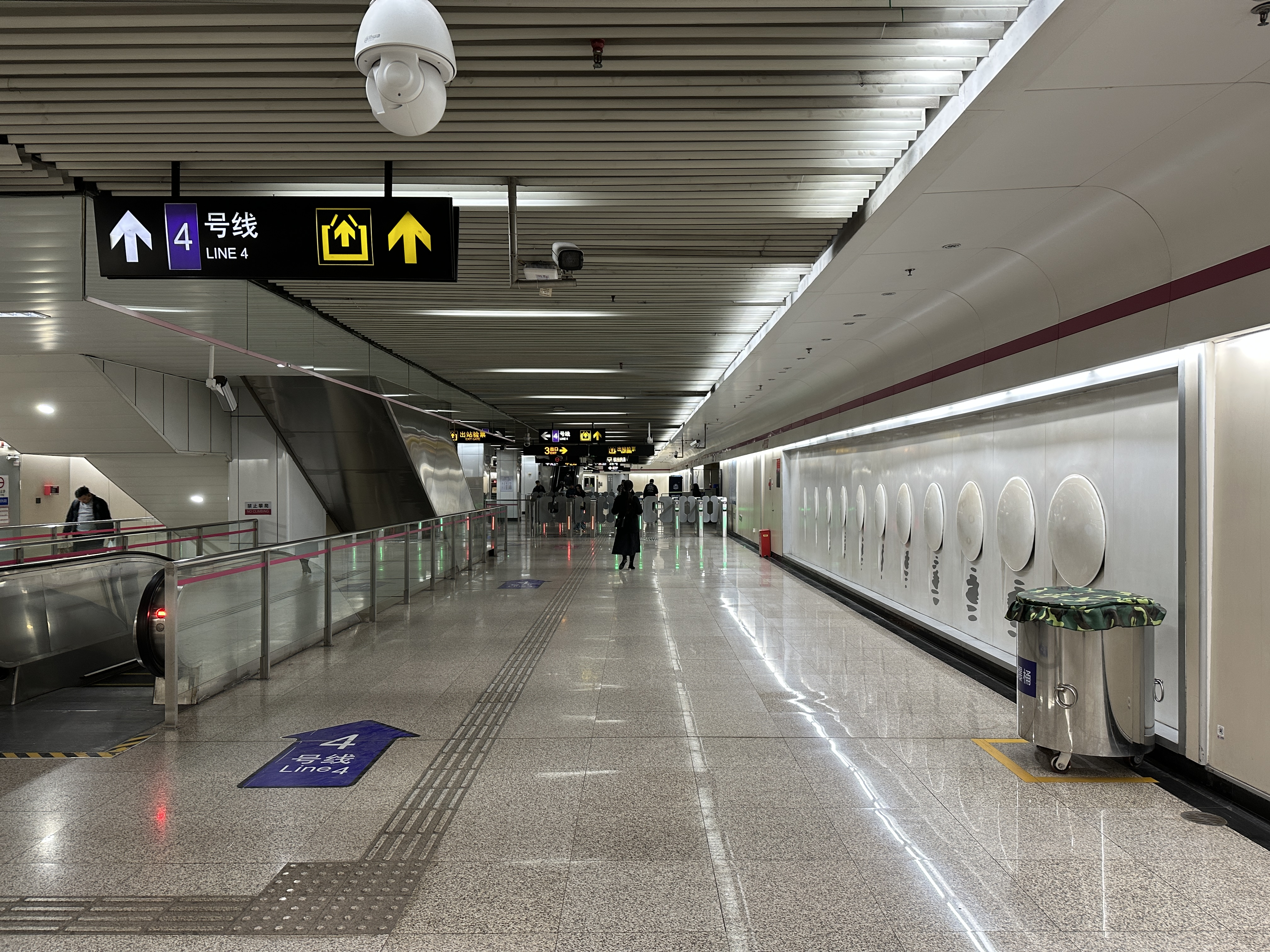
Concourse

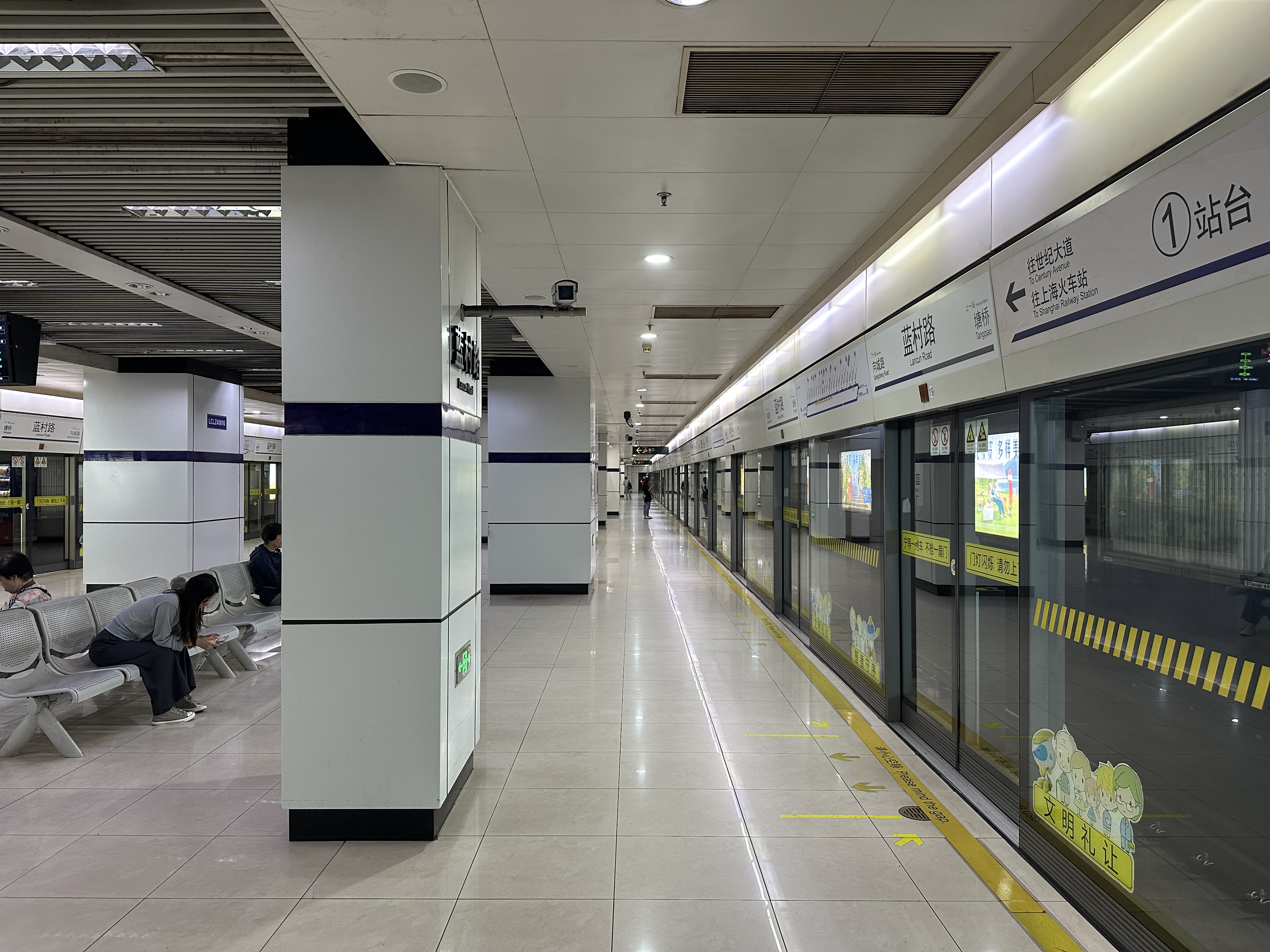
Line 4 platform

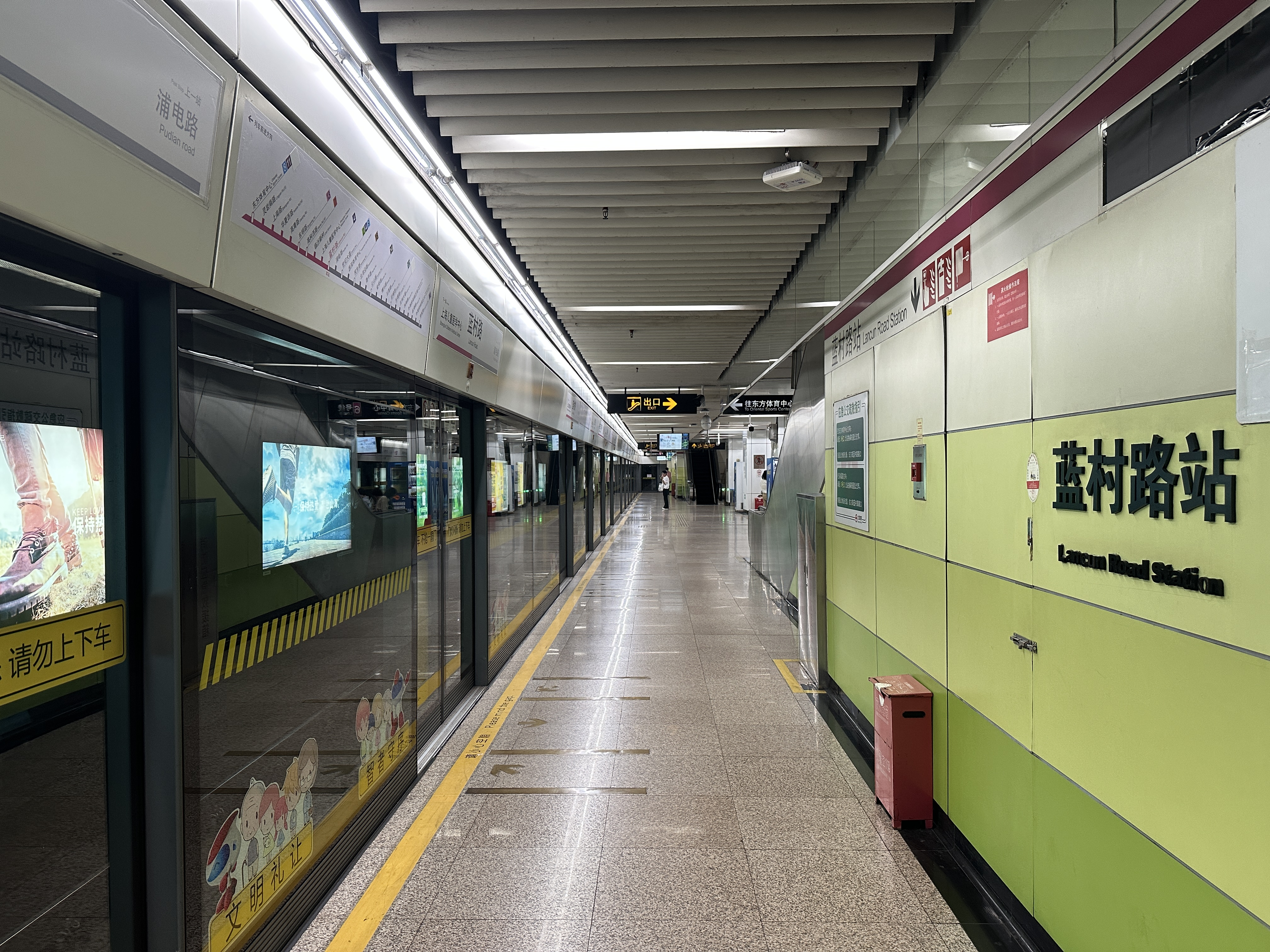
Line 6 platform
