= West Huaxia Road station =

Shanghai Metro station

West Huaxia Road 华夏西路
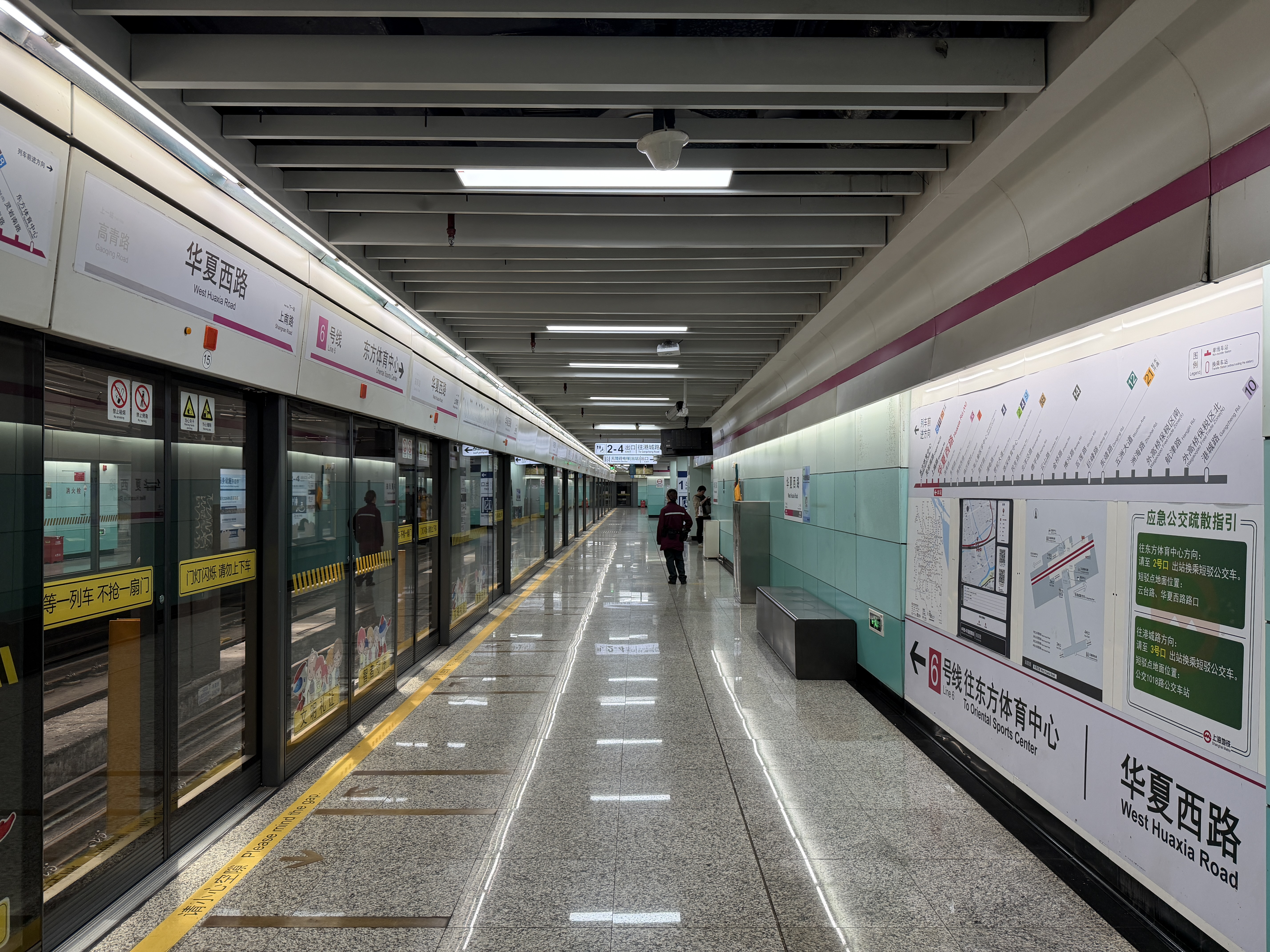
- Station platform

General information
- Location: West Huaxia Road (华夏西路) and Yuntai Road (云台路); Sanlin, Pudong, Shanghai; China
- Coordinates: 31°9′10″N 121°30′48″E
- Operator: Shanghai No. 4 Metro Operation Co. Ltd.
- Line: Line 6
- Platforms: 2 (2 side platforms)
- Tracks: 2

Construction
- Structure type: Underground
- Accessible: Yes

History
- Opened: December 29, 2007

Services
Preceding station	Shanghai Metro	Following station
Gaoqing Road towards Gangcheng Road	Line 6	Shangnan Road towards Oriental Sports Center
Location
- Location within Shanghai

West Huaxia Road (simplified Chinese: 华夏西路; traditional Chinese: 華夏西路; pinyin: Huáxià Xī Lù) is a station on Line 6 of the Shanghai Metro. It began services on December 29, 2007. Although this station is underground, it is not fully covered.
