= Jufeng Road station =

Shanghai Metro interchange station

Jufeng Road 巨峰路
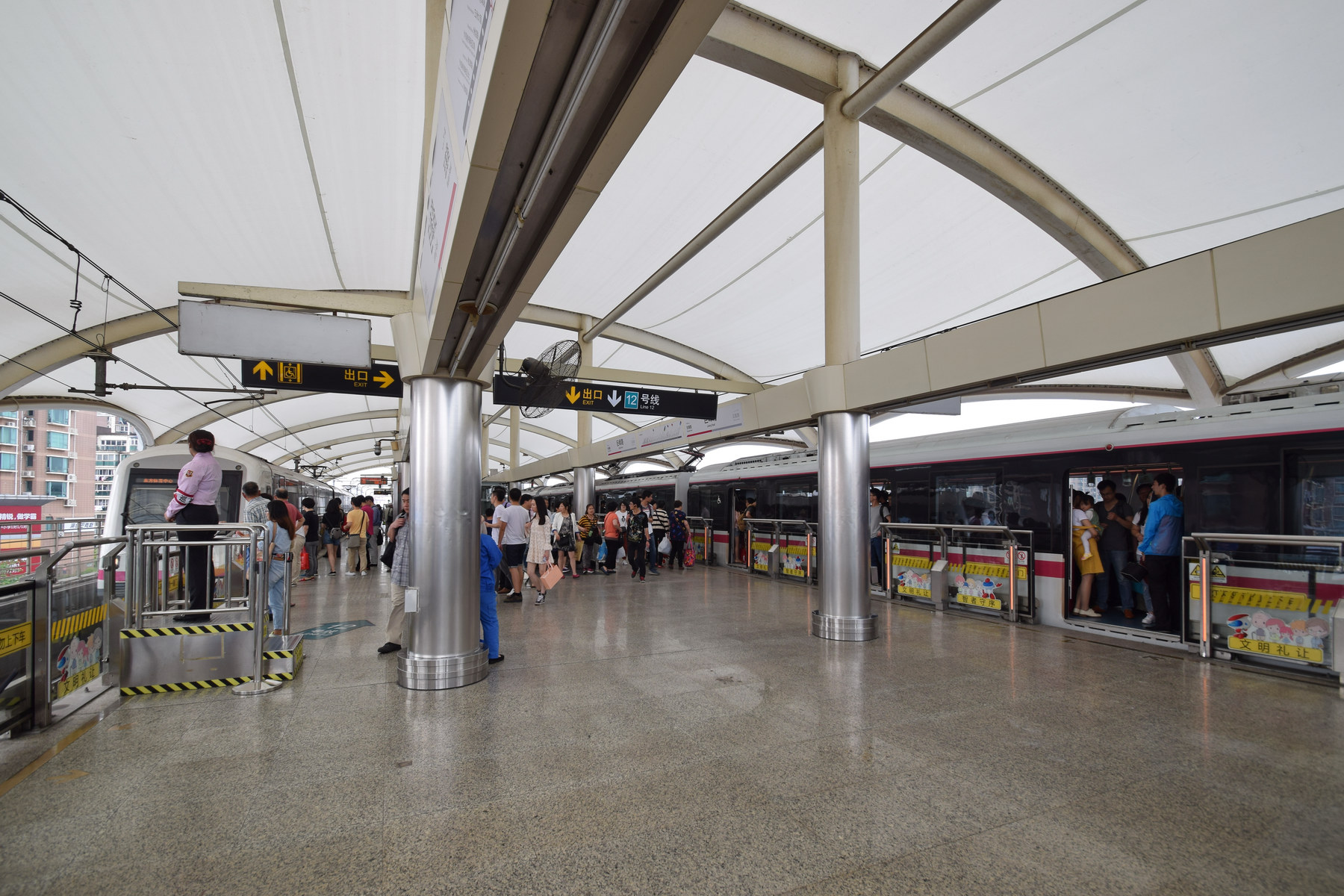
- Line 6 platform

General information
- Location: North Zhangyang Road and Jufeng Road; Pudong, Shanghai; China
- Coordinates: 31.282625°N 121.58470°E
- Lines: Line 6; Line 12
- Platforms: 4 (2 island platforms)
- Tracks: 4

Construction
- Structure type: Elevated (Line 6); Underground (Line 12)
- Accessible: Yes

History
- Opened: 29 December 2007 (Line 6); 29 December 2013 (Line 12)

Services
Preceding station	Shanghai Metro	Following station
Dongjing Road towards Gangcheng Road	Line 6	Wulian Road towards Oriental Sports Center
Donglu Road towards Qixin Road	Line 12	North Yanggao Road towards Jinhai Road
Location
- Location within Shanghai

Jufeng Road (Chinese: 巨峰路; pinyin: Jùfēng Lù) is a Shanghai Metro interchange station in Pudong, Shanghai, located at the intersection of North Zhangyang Road and Jufeng Road. It is served by Lines 6 and 12. It opened for passenger operations on 29 December 2007 with the opening of the initial phase of Line 6. It became an interchange station on 29 December 2013 with the opening of the initial segment of Line 12 between Tiantong Road and Jinhai Road stations.

There is a small train depot at the northern end of the station, which holds trains that run short-turn trips on Line 6 between this station and Shanghai Children's Medical Center station.

== Station layout ==
3F	Northbound	← Line 6 towards Gangcheng Road (Dongjing Road)
3F	Island platform, doors open on the left
3F	Southbound	Line 6 towards Oriental Sports Center (Wulian Road) →
2F	Line 6 concourse	Fare gates, station agent
G	Entrances and exits	Exits 1-5
B1	Line 12 concourse	Fare gates, station agent
B2	Westbound	← Line 12 towards Qixin Road (Donglu Road)
B2	Island platform, doors open on the left
B2	Eastbound	Line 12 towards Jinhai Road (North Yanggao Road) →
