= Gaoqing Road station =

Shanghai Metro station

Gaoqing Road 高青路
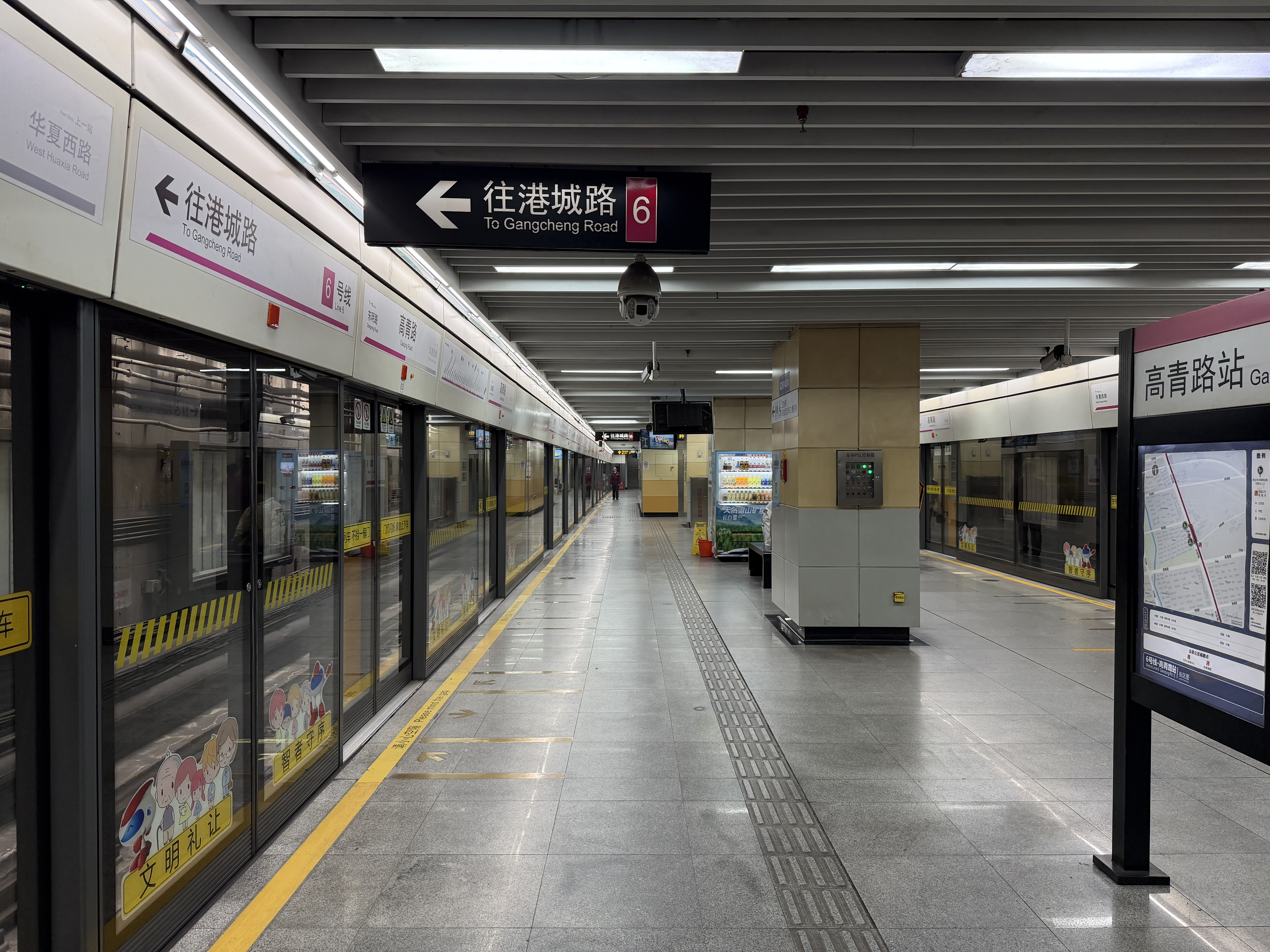
- Station platform

General information
- Location: Dongming Road (东明路) and Gaoqing Road (高青路); Pudong, Shanghai; China
- Coordinates: 31°9′31″N 121°30′45″E
- Operator: Shanghai No. 4 Metro Operation Co. Ltd.
- Line: Line 6
- Platforms: 2 (1 island platform)
- Tracks: 2

Construction
- Structure type: Underground
- Accessible: Yes

History
- Opened: December 29, 2007

Services
| Preceding station | Shanghai Metro | Following station |
|---|---|---|
| Dongming Road towards Gangcheng Road | Line 6 | West Huaxia Road towards Oriental Sports Center |
Location
- Location within Shanghai

Gaoqing Road (Chinese: 高青路; pinyin: Gāoqīng Lù) is a station on Line 6 of the Shanghai Metro. It began services on December 29, 2007. The station is located at an intersection between Huxiang Road and Laoan Road.

This station is the southern terminus for trains that run short trips along the line during peak hours between here and Jufeng Road.
