= South Waigaoqiao Free Trade Zone station =

Shanghai Metro station

South Waigaoqiao Free Trade Zone 外高桥保税区南
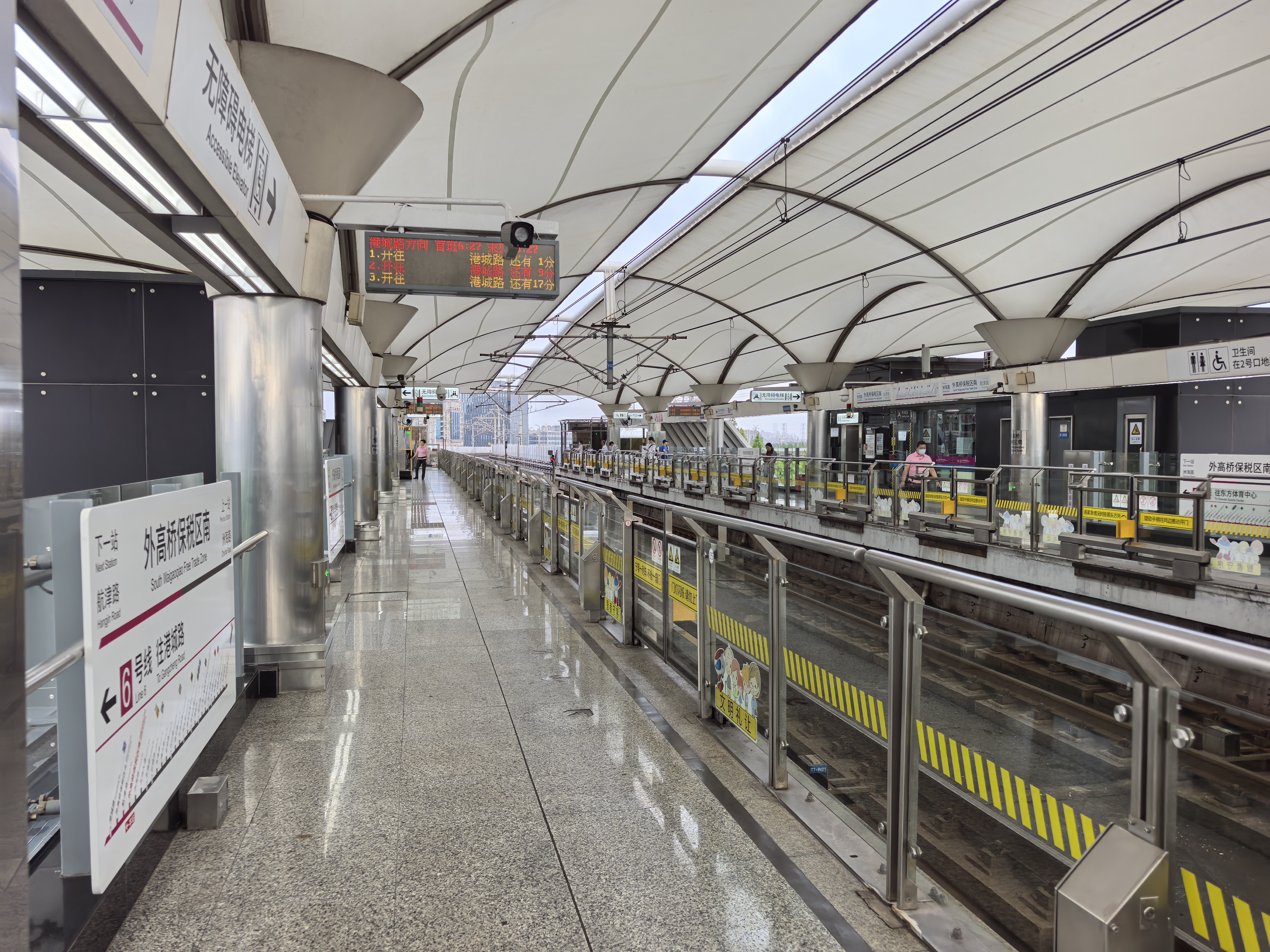
- Station platform

General information
- Location: Shanghai; China
- Coordinates: 31.3236°N 121.598°E
- Operator: Shanghai No. 4 Metro Operation Co. Ltd.
- Line: Line 6
- Platforms: 2 (2 side platforms)
- Tracks: 2

Construction
- Structure type: Elevated
- Accessible: Yes

History
- Opened: 29 December 2007

Services
Preceding station	Shanghai Metro	Following station
Hangjin Road towards Gangcheng Road	Line 6	Zhouhai Road towards Oriental Sports Center
Location
- Location within Shanghai

South Waigaoqiao Free Trade Zone (simplified Chinese: 外高桥保税区南; traditional Chinese: 外高橋保稅區南; pinyin: Wàigāoqiáo Bǎoshuìqū Nán) is a station on Line 6 of the Shanghai Metro. It began operation on December 29, 2007. The station is located within the Waigaoqiao Free Trade Zone, Pudong.
