= Wuzhou Avenue station =

Shanghai Metro station

Wuzhou Avenue 五洲大道
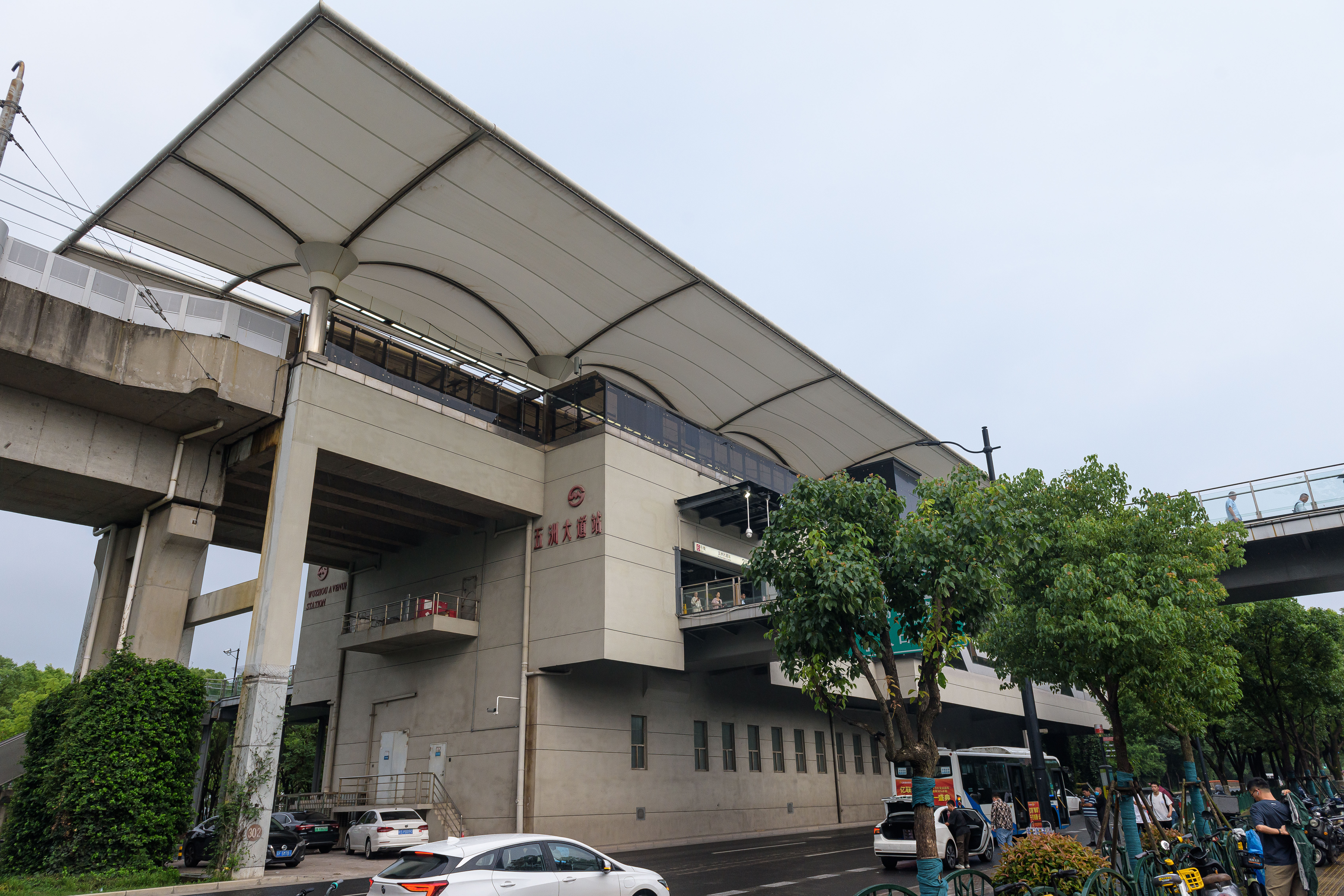
- Station exterior

General information
- Location: North Zhangyang Road (张杨北路) and Wuzhou Avenue; Pudong, Shanghai; China
- Coordinates: 31.3047°N 121.585°E
- Operator: Shanghai No. 4 Metro Operation Co. Ltd.
- Line: Line 6
- Platforms: 2 (2 side platforms)
- Tracks: 2

Construction
- Structure type: Elevated
- Accessible: Yes

History
- Opened: December 29, 2007

Services
| Preceding station | Shanghai Metro | Following station |
|---|---|---|
| Zhouhai Road towards Gangcheng Road | Line 6 | Dongjing Road towards Oriental Sports Center |
Location
- Location within Shanghai

Wuzhou Avenue (Chinese: 五洲大道; pinyin: Wǔzhōu Dàdào) is a station on Line 6 of the Shanghai Metro. It began operation on December 29, 2007.

It is located in Shanghai's Pudong New Area.
