= Jinqiao Road station =

Shanghai Metro station

Jinqiao Road 金桥路
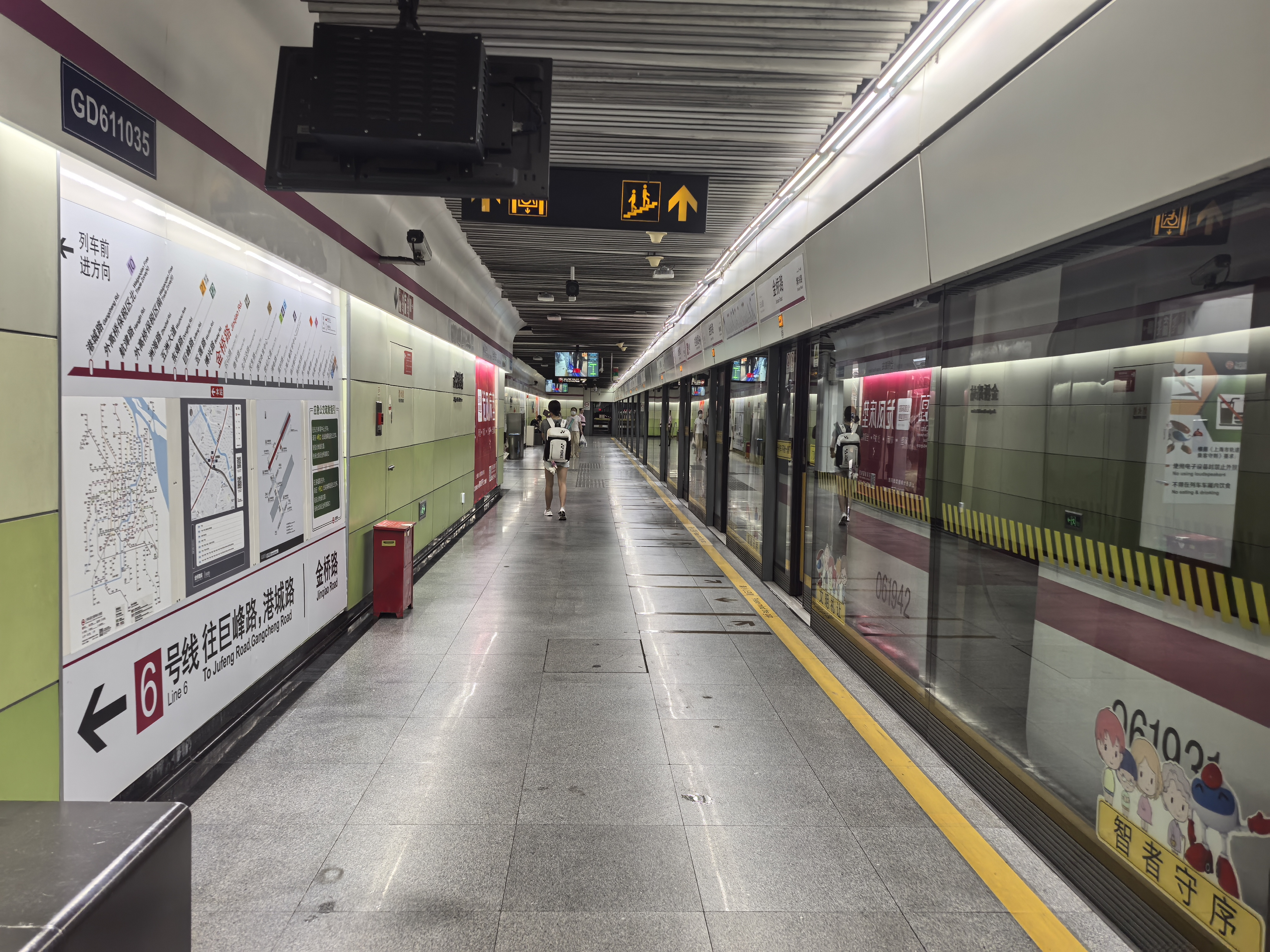
- Northbound platform

General information
- Location: North Zhangyang Road (张杨北路) and Jinqiao Road (金桥路); Pudong, Shanghai; China
- Coordinates: 31.2592°N 121.577°E
- Operator: Shanghai No. 4 Metro Operation Co. Ltd.
- Line: Line 6
- Platforms: 2 (2 side platforms)
- Tracks: 2

Construction
- Structure type: Underground
- Accessible: Yes

History
- Opened: 29 December 2007

Services
Preceding station	Shanghai Metro	Following station
Boxing Road towards Gangcheng Road	Line 6	Yunshan Road towards Oriental Sports Center
Location
- Location within Shanghai

Jinqiao Road (simplified Chinese: 金桥路; traditional Chinese: 金橋路; pinyin: Jīnqiáo Lù) is a station on Line 6 of the Shanghai Metro. It began operation on December 29, 2007.

It is located at the junction of Jinqiao Road and Zhangyang Road (North), in Shanghai's Pudong New Area.
