= Shanghai Children's Medical Center station =

Shanghai Metro station

Shanghai Children's Medical Center 上海儿童医学中心
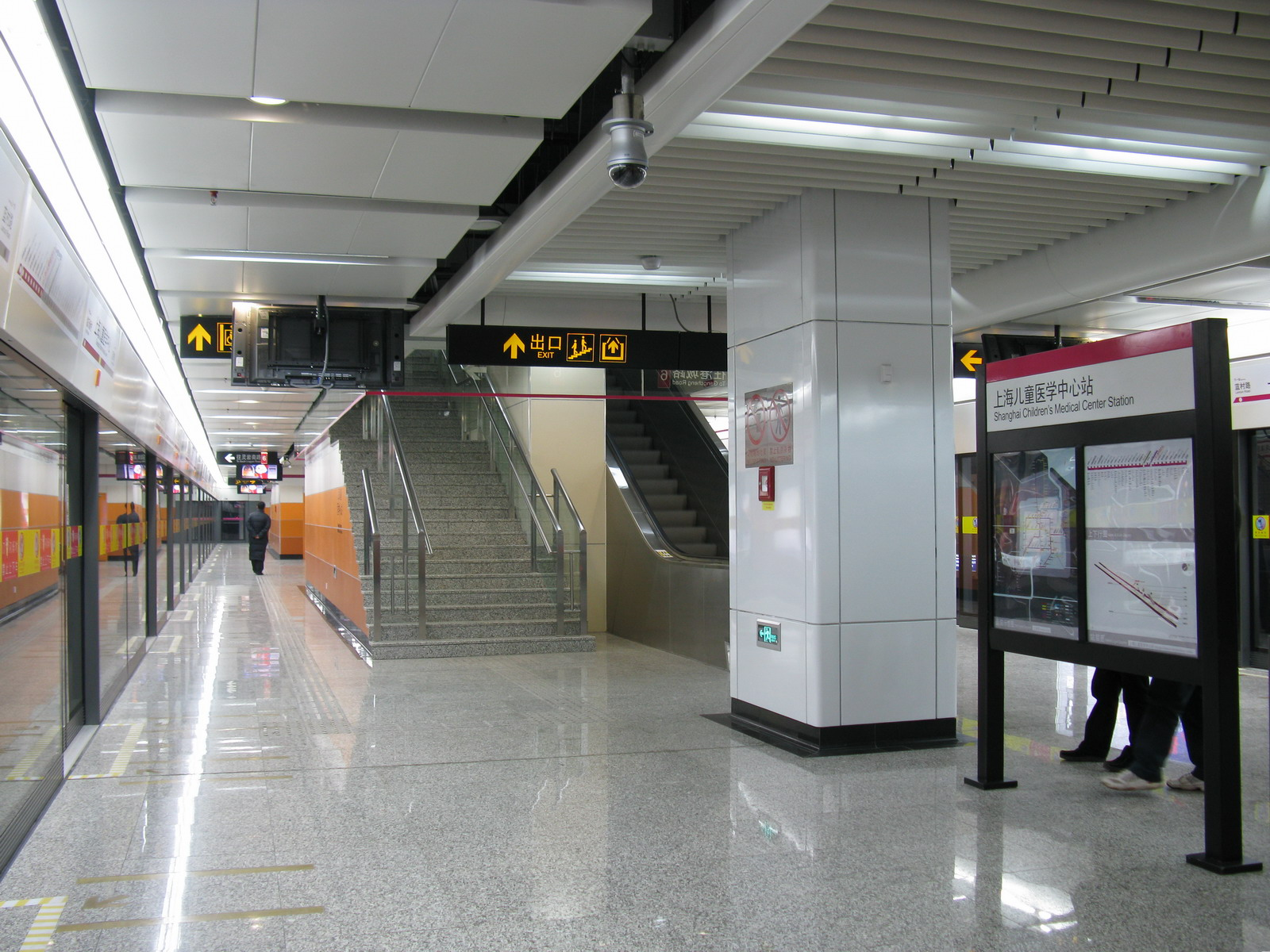
- Station platform

General information
- Location: Shanghai; China
- Coordinates: 31.2047°N 121.519°E
- Operator: Shanghai No. 4 Metro Operation Co. Ltd.
- Line: Line 6
- Platforms: 2 (1 island platform)
- Tracks: 2

Construction
- Structure type: Underground
- Accessible: Yes

History
- Opened: 29 December 2007

Services
Preceding station	Shanghai Metro	Following station
Lancun Road towards Gangcheng Road	Line 6	Linyi Xincun towards Oriental Sports Center
Location
- Location within Shanghai

Shanghai Children's Medical Center (simplified Chinese: 上海儿童医学中心; traditional Chinese: 上海兒童醫學中心; pinyin: Shànghǎi Értóng Yīxuézhōngxīn) is a station on Line 6 of the Shanghai Metro. It began operation on December 29, 2007.

This station was the southern terminus for short-turn services, the new short-turn terminus is Gaoqing Road station.

== Places nearby ==
- Renji Hospital (East Part)
- Shanghai Children's Medical Center
