= Shangnan Road station =

Shanghai Metro station

Shangnan Road 上南路
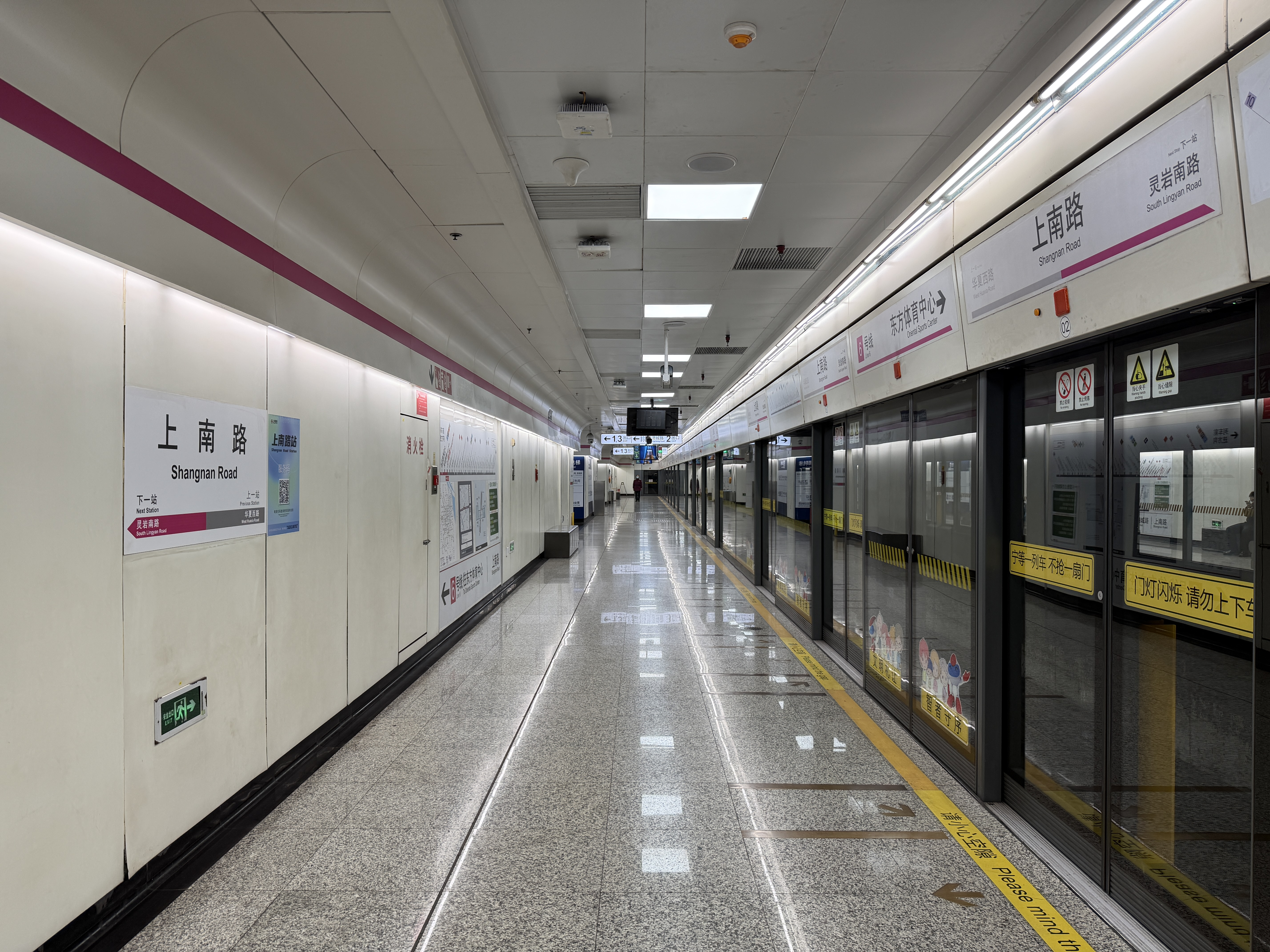
- Station platform

General information
- Location: West Huaxia Road (华夏西路) and Shangnan Road; Sanlin, Pudong, Shanghai; China
- Coordinates: 31°9′3″N 121°30′7″E
- Operator: Shanghai No. 4 Metro Operation Co. Ltd.
- Line: Line 6
- Platforms: 2 (2 side platforms)
- Tracks: 2

Construction
- Structure type: Underground
- Accessible: Yes

History
- Opened: December 29, 2007

Services
Preceding station	Shanghai Metro	Following station
West Huaxia Road towards Gangcheng Road	Line 6	South Lingyan Road towards Oriental Sports Center
Location
- Location within Shanghai

Shangnan Road (Chinese: 上南路; pinyin: Shǎngnán Lù) is a station on Line 6 of the Shanghai Metro. It began services on December 29, 2007.
