= Dongjing Road station =

Shanghai Metro station

Dongjing Road 东靖路
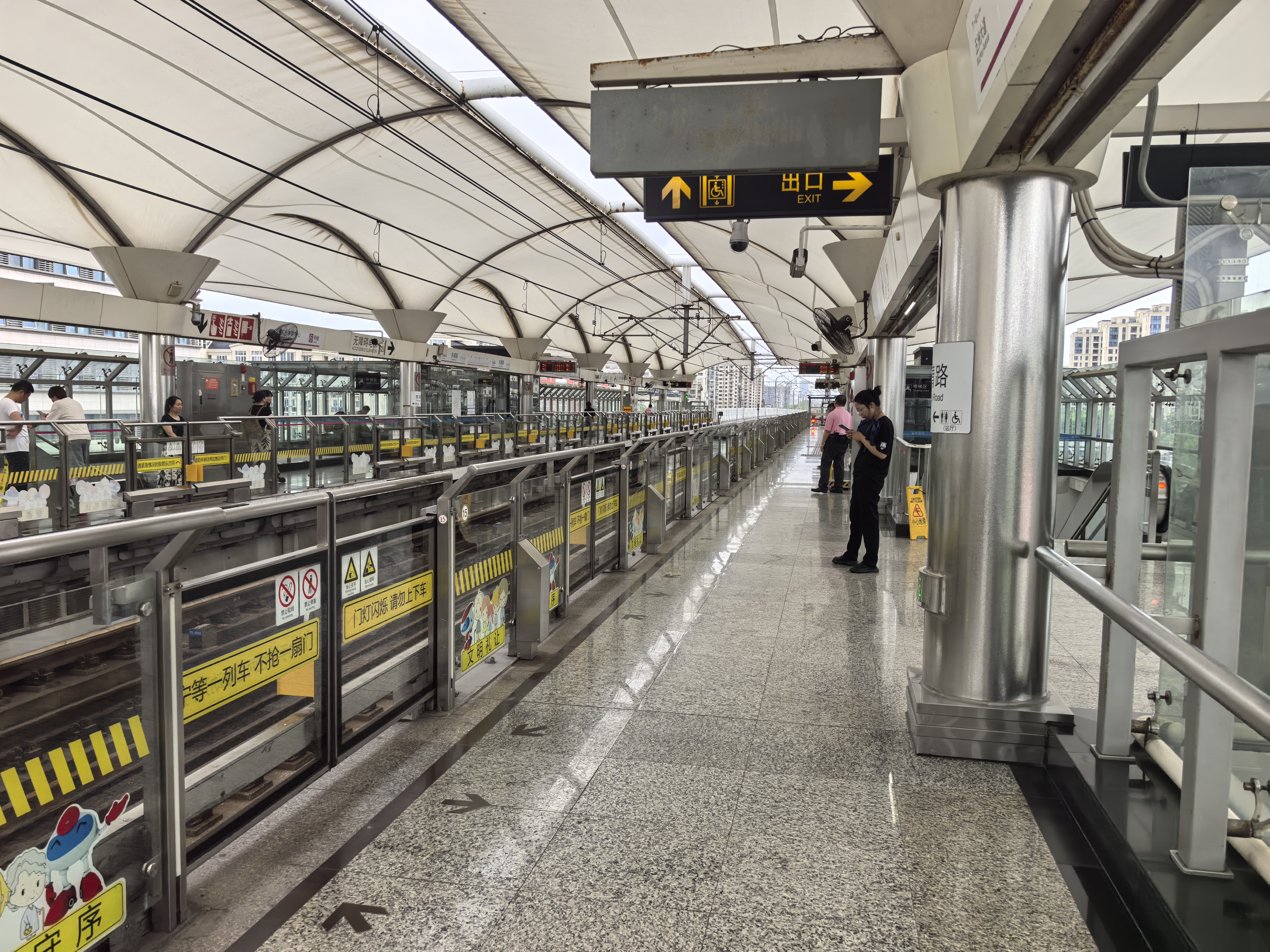
- Station platform, Gangcheng Road-bound side

General information
- Location: North Zhangyang Road (张杨北路) and Dongjing Road (东靖路); Pudong, Shanghai; China
- Coordinates: 31.2928°N 121.584°E
- Operator: Shanghai No. 4 Metro Operation Co., Ltd.
- Line: Line 6
- Platforms: 2 (2 side platforms)
- Tracks: 2

Construction
- Structure type: Elevated
- Accessible: Yes

History
- Opened: December 29, 2007

Services
Preceding station	Shanghai Metro	Following station
Wuzhou Avenue towards Gangcheng Road	Line 6	Jufeng Road towards Oriental Sports Center
Location
- Location within Shanghai

Dongjing Road (simplified Chinese: 东靖路; traditional Chinese: 東靖路; pinyin: Dōngjìng Lù) is a station on Line 6 of the Shanghai Metro. It began operation on December 29, 2007.

The station is located near the junction of Dongjing Road and North Zhangyang Road in Pudong New Area.
