= South Lingyan Road station =

Shanghai Metro station

South Lingyan Road 灵岩南路
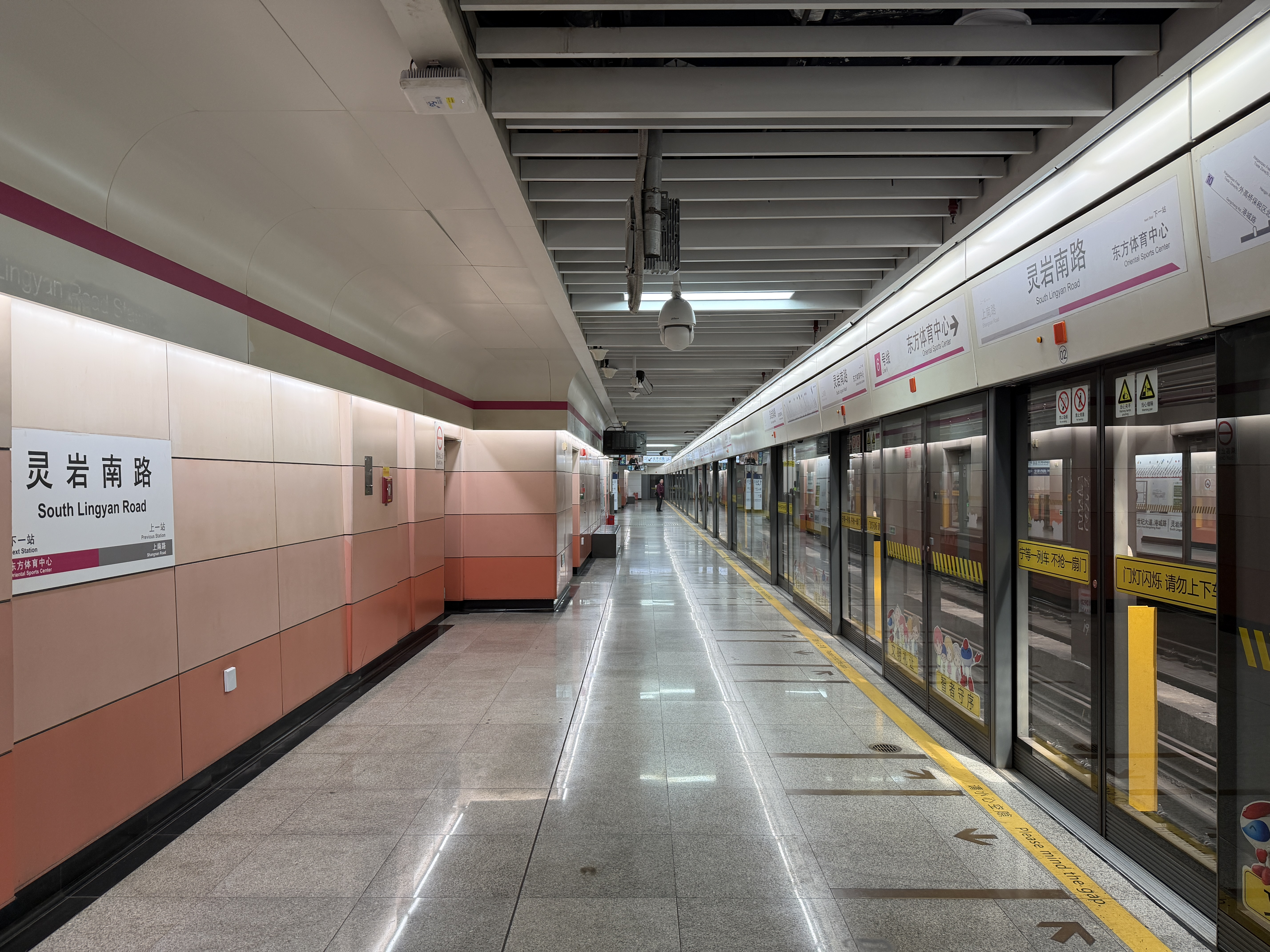
- Station platform

General information
- Location: West Huaxia Road (华夏西路) and South Lingyan Road (灵岩南路); Sanlin, Pudong, Shanghai; China
- Coordinates: 31.1508°N 121.49°E
- Operator: Shanghai No. 4 Metro Operation Co. Ltd.
- Line: Line 6
- Platforms: 2 (2 side platforms)
- Tracks: 2

Construction
- Structure type: Underground
- Accessible: Yes

History
- Opened: December 29, 2007

Services
Preceding station	Shanghai Metro	Following station
Shangnan Road towards Gangcheng Road	Line 6	Oriental Sports Center Terminus
Location
- Location within Shanghai

South Lingyan Road (simplified Chinese: 灵岩南路; traditional Chinese: 靈巖南路; pinyin: Língyán Nán Lù) is a station of Line 6 on the Shanghai Metro. It began operation on December 29, 2007, and served as the southern terminus of Line 6 until April 11, 2011, with the opening of Oriental Sports Center station. It is located in Sanlin Town, Pudong. It was previously named Jiyang road. Line 11 passes through the station without stopping. An interchange is available at Oriental Sports Center. Although this station is underground, it is not fully covered.
