= Longyao Road station =

Shanghai Metro station

Longyao Road 龙耀路
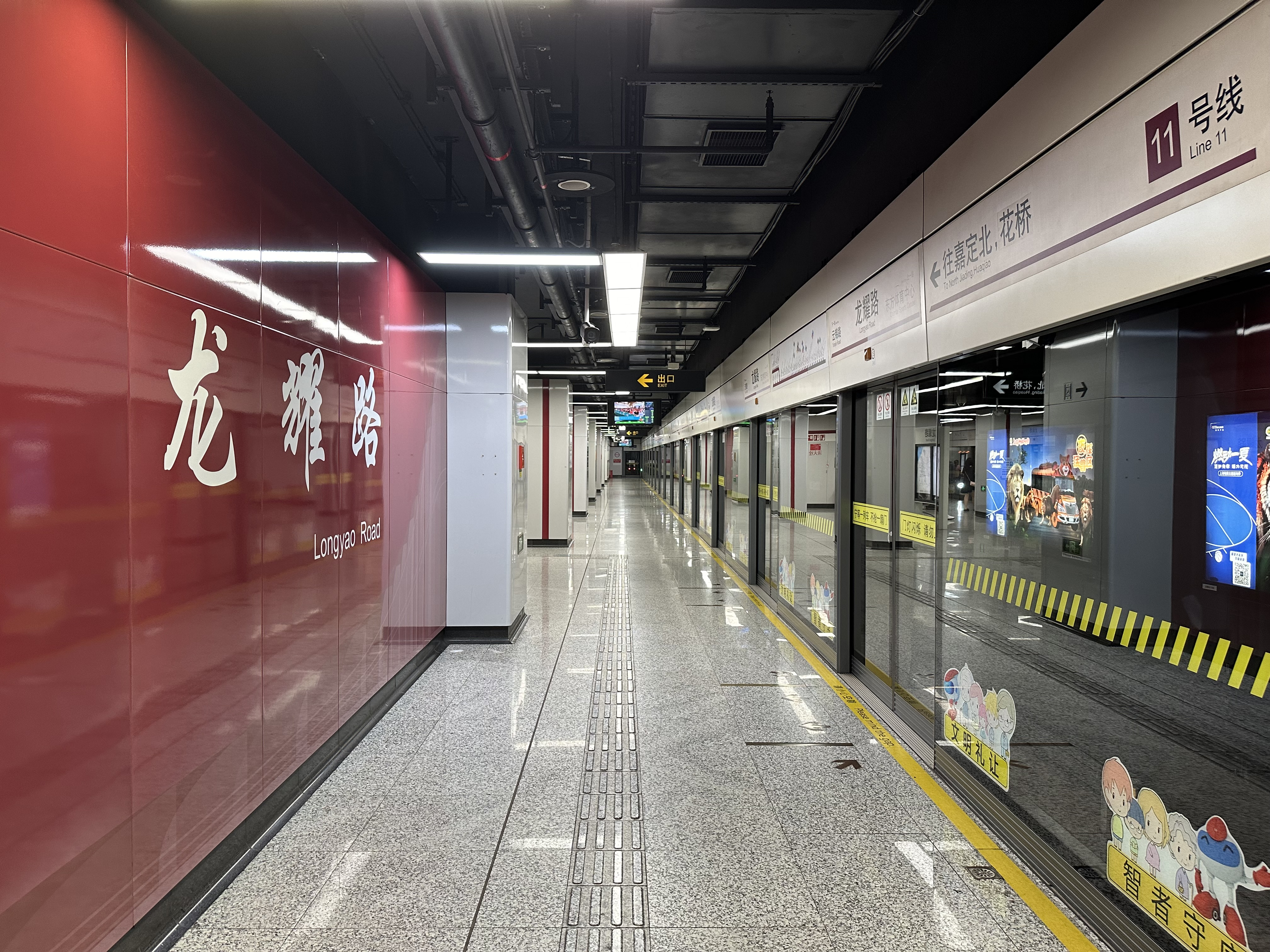
- Station platform

General information
- Location: Yunjin Road (云锦路) between Longyao Road (龙耀路) and South Longshui Road (龙水南路); Longhua Subdistrict, Xuhui District, Shanghai; China
- Coordinates: 31.1600°N 121.4592°E
- Operator: Shanghai No. 2 Metro Operation Co. Ltd.
- Line: Line 11
- Platforms: 2 (1 island platform)
- Tracks: 2

Construction
- Structure type: Underground
- Accessible: Yes

History
- Opened: August 31, 2013

Services
Preceding station	Shanghai Metro	Following station
Yunjin Road towards North Jiading or Huaqiao	Line 11	Oriental Sports Center towards Disney Resort
Location
- Location within Shanghai

Longyao Road (simplified Chinese: 龙耀路; traditional Chinese: 龍耀路; pinyin: Lóngyào Lù) is a station on Line 11 of the Shanghai Metro. It opened on August 31, 2013.

The station is located in Longhua Subdistrict, Xuhui District, Shanghai, and is the first station in Puxi when travelling northwest-bound from Pudong.
