= Line 6 (Shanghai Metro) =

Shanghai Metro line

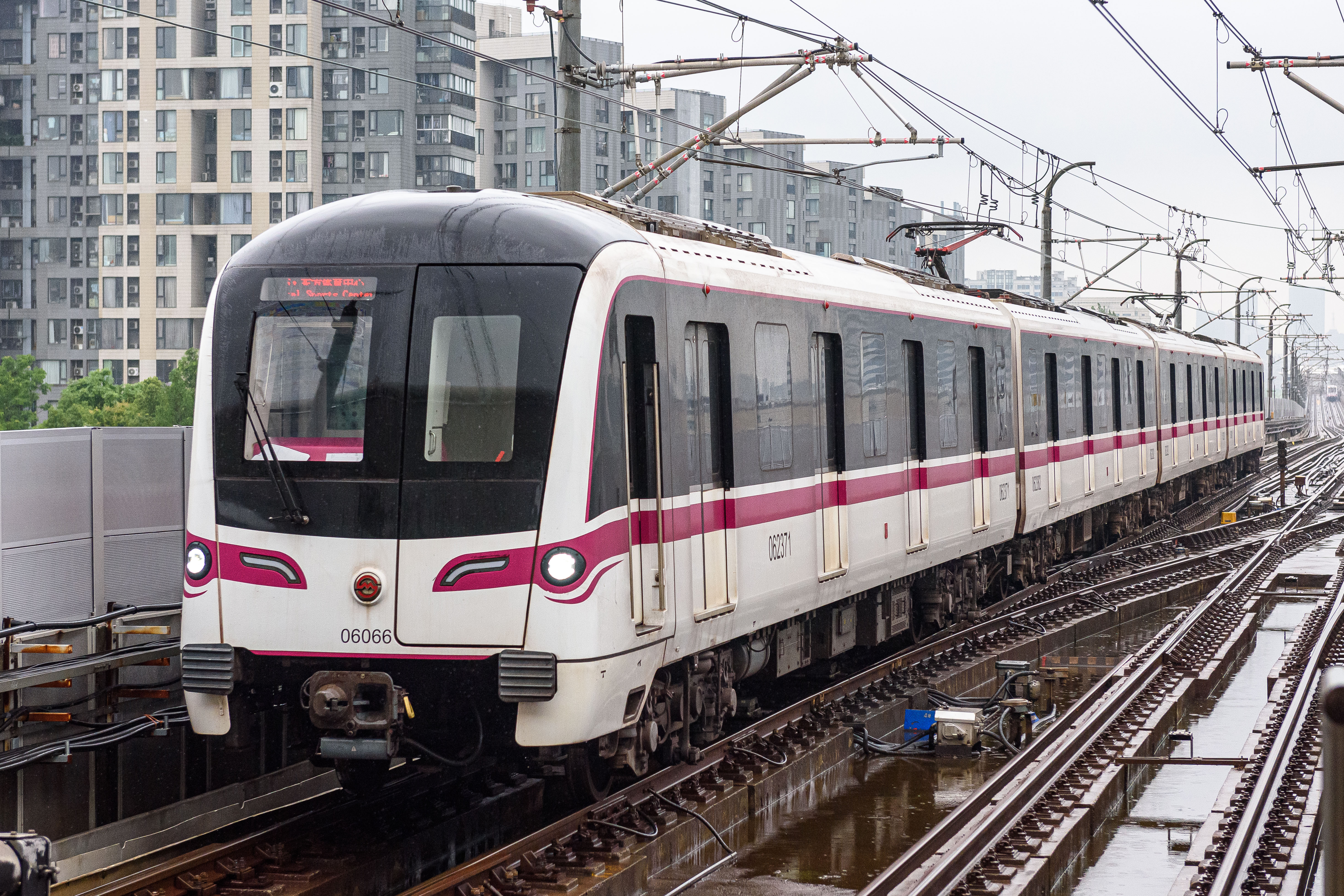
- A 06C04 train entering Wuzhou Avenue station

Overview
- Other names: L4 (planned name); Pudong line (Chinese: 浦东线); Pudong light rail (Chinese: 浦东轻轨); Hello Kitty line (nickname)
- Native name: 上海地铁6号线
- Status: Operational
- Owner: Shanghai Rail Transit Pudong Line Development Co., Ltd.
- Locale: Pudong district, Shanghai, China
- Termini: Gangcheng Road; Oriental Sports Center
- Stations: 28

Service
- Type: Rapid transit
- System: Shanghai Metro
- Operator(s): Shanghai No. 4 Metro Operation Co. Ltd.
- Depot(s): Gangcheng Road Depot; Sanlin Yard
- Rolling stock: 06C01; 06C02; 08C02; 06C03; 06C04
- Daily ridership: 520,000 (2019 peak)

History
- Commenced: October 31, 2002; 23 years ago
- Opened: December 29, 2007; 18 years ago
- Last extension: April 12, 2011; 15 years ago

Technical
- Line length: 32.318 km (20.08 mi)
- Number of tracks: 2
- Character: Underground and elevated
- Track gauge: 1,435 mm (4 ft 8 1/2 in)
- Electrification: Overhead lines (1500 volts)
- Operating speed: 80 km/h (50 mph); Average speed: 30.1 km/h (19 mph)
- Signalling: Thales’ SelTracTM CBTC
Route map
Route on the Shanghai map:
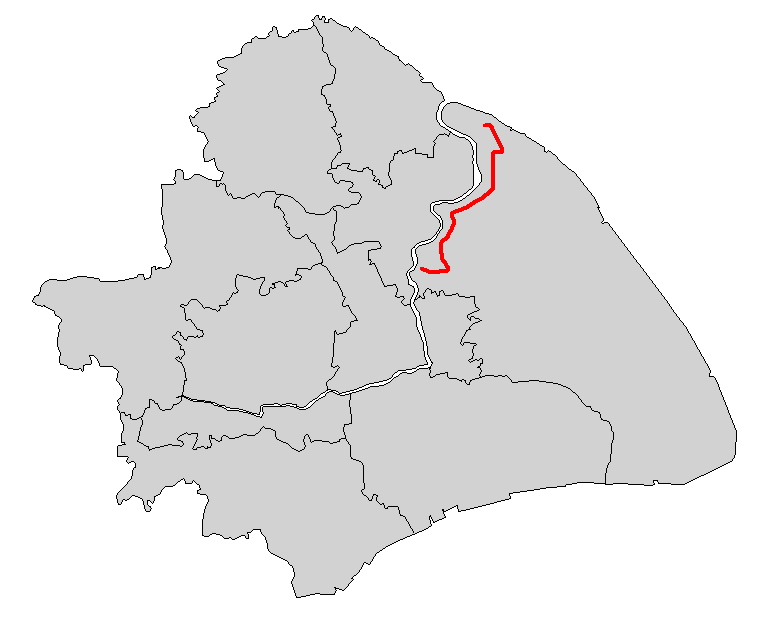
To scale geographic map:

Line 6 is an eastern north–south line of the Shanghai Metro network. It opened on December 29, 2007. The entire line is located in the Pudong New Area. A complete trip between the two end terminals, Gangcheng Road and Oriental Sports Center takes approximately 1 hour and 10 minutes. Line 6 has been dubbed the unofficial nickname “Hello Kitty Line” due to its lurid pink livery. The line is colored magenta on system maps.

== History ==
Shanghai Metro Line 6 opening history
Segment	Commencement	Opened	Length	Station(s)	Name	Investment
Gangcheng Road — South Lingyan Road	31 Oct 2002	29 Dec 2007	31.1 km (19.32 mi)	27	Initial phase	¥12 billion
South Lingyan Road — Oriental Sports Center		12 Apr 2011	1.2 km (0.75 mi)	1	Line 8 & 11 connector project

=== Controversy ===
Like the Lexington Avenue Subway in New York City, passenger traffic has consistently exceeded the designed capacity of the line since its opening and causes severe strain to the services. The planning of Line 6 began in 2000, but real estate development along the proposed line happened faster than anticipated upon the line's initial opening. Uniquely at the time, a majority of the Line 6 opened in one phase creating a 30-kilometer (19 mi) long corridor overnight. Existing buses were cancelled or diverted simultaneously due to the opening of Line 6, forcing residents along the line to travel by rail transit. This was exacerbated by high initial train headways upon opening as all ordered rolling stock have not been completely delivered. Additionally, the line had relatively short operating hours leading to large number of passengers flooding into the first train. Line 6 was initially forecasted to carry 105,000 people/day. However the aforementioned factors led to the ridership of the line to exceed 150,000 people/day during the first few days of operation. Realizing the sheer miscalculation during construction, the municipal government pledged to add new trains and shorten wait times starting in June 2008. However, Line 6 still suffers severe crowding and delays especially during rush hours with passenger flow growing faster than expected. In 2012 the busiest section of the line was still running at 133% capacity. With the opening of Line 12 the Shanghai Metro advises passengers divert to the new line to relieve crowding. The line was built to accommodate light metro narrow-bodied "C size" trains with 4 carriages each, which is not interchangeable with wide-body "A size" trains with 6 to 8 carriages on other Shanghai Metro lines. This difference in loading gauge has made it impractical to upgrade the line to higher capacity "A size" trains to relieve demand. The platform length (especially at underground stations) has made it impractical to upgrade the line to accommodate more carriages.

== Stations ==
=== Service routes ===
Shanghai Metro Line 6 service routes
M - Mainline: Gangcheng Road ↔ Oriental Sports Center; C - Core: Jufeng Road ↔ Gaoqing Road (not operating during AM peak); A - AM Peak: Gangcheng Road ↔ Gaoqing Road
Routes			Station name		Connections	Distance			Location	Open- ing	Plat- form
M	C	A	English	Chinese	Connections	km		min	Location	Open- ing	Plat- form
●		●	Gangcheng Road	港城路	10	0.00	0.00	0	Pudong	29 Dec 2007	Elevated Side
●		●	North Waigaoqiao Free Trade Zone	外高桥保税区北		1.62	1.62	3	Pudong	29 Dec 2007	Elevated Side
●		●	Hangjin Road	航津路		1.53	3.15	5	Pudong	29 Dec 2007	Elevated Side
●		●	South Waigaoqiao Free Trade Zone	外高桥保税区南		1.71	4.86	7	Pudong	29 Dec 2007	Elevated Side
●		●	Zhouhai Road	洲海路		2.03	6.89	10	Pudong	29 Dec 2007	Elevated Side
●		●	Wuzhou Avenue	五洲大道		1.08	7.97	12	Pudong	29 Dec 2007	Elevated Side
●		●	Dongjing Road	东靖路		1.32	9.29	15	Pudong	29 Dec 2007	Elevated Side
●	●	●	Jufeng Road	巨峰路	12	1.11	10.40	17	Pudong	29 Dec 2007	Elevated Island
●	●	●	Wulian Road	五莲路		0.96	11.36	20	Pudong	29 Dec 2007	Elevated Side
●	●	●	Boxing Road	博兴路		0.90	12.26	22	Pudong	29 Dec 2007	Sub-surface Side
●	●	●	Jinqiao Road	金桥路		0.81	13.07	24	Pudong	29 Dec 2007	Sub-surface Side
●	●	●	Yunshan Road	云山路	14	1.13	14.20	27	Pudong	29 Dec 2007	Sub-surface Side
●	●	●	Deping Road	德平路		1.03	15.23	29	Pudong	29 Dec 2007	Sub-surface Side
●	●	●	Beiyangjing Road	北洋泾路		1.34	16.57	31	Pudong	29 Dec 2007	Sub-surface Side
●	●	●	Minsheng Road	民生路	18	0.89	17.46	33	Pudong	29 Dec 2007	Sub-surface Side
●	●	●	Yuanshen Sports Center	源深体育中心		0.87	18.33	36	Pudong	29 Dec 2007	Sub-surface Side
●	●	●	Century Avenue	世纪大道	2 4 9	0.93	19.26	38	Pudong	29 Dec 2007	Sub-surface Side
●	●	●	Pudian Road	浦电路		1.07	20.33	40	Pudong	29 Dec 2007	Underground Island
●	●	●	Lancun Road	蓝村路	4	0.93	21.26	43	Pudong	29 Dec 2007	Underground Island
●	●	●	Shanghai Children's Medical Center	上海儿童医学中心		0.99	22.25	45	Pudong	29 Dec 2007	Underground Island
●	●	●	Linyi Xincun	临沂新村		1.34	23.59	47	Pudong	29 Dec 2007	Underground Island
●	●	●	West Gaoke Road	高科西路	7	1.11	24.70	50	Pudong	29 Dec 2007	Underground Island
●	●	●	Dongming Road	东明路	13	1.45	26.15	52	Pudong	29 Dec 2007	Underground Island
●	●	●	Gaoqing Road	高青路		1.57	27.72	54	Pudong	29 Dec 2007	Underground Island
●			West Huaxia Road	华夏西路		1.40	29.12	57	Pudong	29 Dec 2007	Sub-surfaceSide
●			Shangnan Road	上南路		0.80	29.92	60	Pudong	29 Dec 2007	Sub-surfaceSide
●			South Lingyan Road	灵岩南路		1.08	31.00	62	Pudong	29 Dec 2007	Sub-surfaceSide
●			Oriental Sports Center	东方体育中心	8 11	1.54	32.54	65	Pudong	12 April 2011	Underground Double Island (shared with 11 )

=== Important stations ===
- Century Avenue is an interchange with lines 2, 4 and 9.
- Lancun Road is an interchange with line 4.
- West Gaoke Road is an interchange with line 7.
- Oriental Sports Center, the final station of line 6, opened in April 2011. It is an interchange with lines 8 and 11.
- Jufeng Road is an interchange with line 12.
- Dongming Road is an interchange with line 13.
- Gangcheng Road, the other terminal station of line 6, interchange with line 10.
- Yunshan Road is an interchange with line 14.

=== Future expansion ===
There are no plans to extend the line.

=== Station name change ===
- On 28 October 2006, Dongfang Road was renamed as the Century Avenue after station renovation for line 2 and the opening of line 4 (before line 6 began serving the station).
- On May 7, 2011, Jiyang Road was renamed Oriental Sports Center.

== Headways ==
Shanghai Metro Line 6 headway
Time		Gangcheng Road - Jufeng Road	Jufeng Road - Gaoqing Road	Gaoqing Road - Oriental Sports Center
Monday - Friday (Working Days)
AM peak	7:20–9:00	About 2 min		About 4 min
Off-peak	9:00–16:30	About 9 min	About 4 min and 30 sec	About 9 min
PM peak	16:30–19:00	About 3 min and 45 sec	About 2 min and 30 sec	About 3 min and 45 sec
Other hours	Before 7:20 After 19:00	About 10 min - 12 min	About 5 min - 6 min	About 10 min - 12 min
Saturday and Sunday (Weekends)
Peak	8:30–20:30	About 10 min	About 3 min and 20 sec	About 10 min
Other hours	Before 8:30 After 20:30	About 10 min - 12 min	About 5 min - 10 min	About 10 min - 12 min

== Rolling stock ==
The designed speed of the train is 80 km/h, the length (Class A carriages are longer at 23 meters) is 19.49 meters (Tc)/19.44 meters (Mp, M), and the width (Class A carriages are wider at 3.0 meters) is 2.6 meters.

Shanghai Metro Line 6 rolling stock
Fleet numbers	Manufacturer	Time of manufac- turing	Class	No of car	Assembly (Note: Tc: Trailer with cab; Mp: EMU with pantograph; M: EMU without pantograph.)	Rolling stock	Number	Notes
84	SATCO (Note: SATCO (Shanghai Alstom Transportation Equipment Co., Ltd.) is a joint venture between Alstom Metropolis and Shanghai Electric.)	2007-2009	C (Note: Class C carriage: 19.44m in length, 2.6m in width and 3.8m in height; Capacity: about 200 people.)	4	Tc+Mp+Mp+Tc	06C01	0601-0603 (060011-060121); 0605-0613 (060131-060481); 0615-0623 (060491-060841)	Original name: AC12.
44	CRRC Changchun Railway Vehicles Co., Ltd.	2009-2010	C	4	Tc+Mp+Mp+Tc	06C02	0625-0633 (060851-061201); 0635-0636 (061211-061281)	Original name: AC14A.
72	CRRC Changchun Railway Vehicles Co., Ltd.	2011-2012	C	4	Tc+Mp+Mp+Tc	06C03	0637-0643 (061291-061601); 0645-0653 (061611-061921); 0655-0656 (061931-062001)	Original name: AC14B.
104	CRRC Changchun Railway Vehicles Co., Ltd.	2018-2020	C	4	Tc+Mp+Mp+Tc	06C04	06057-06082 (062011-063041)

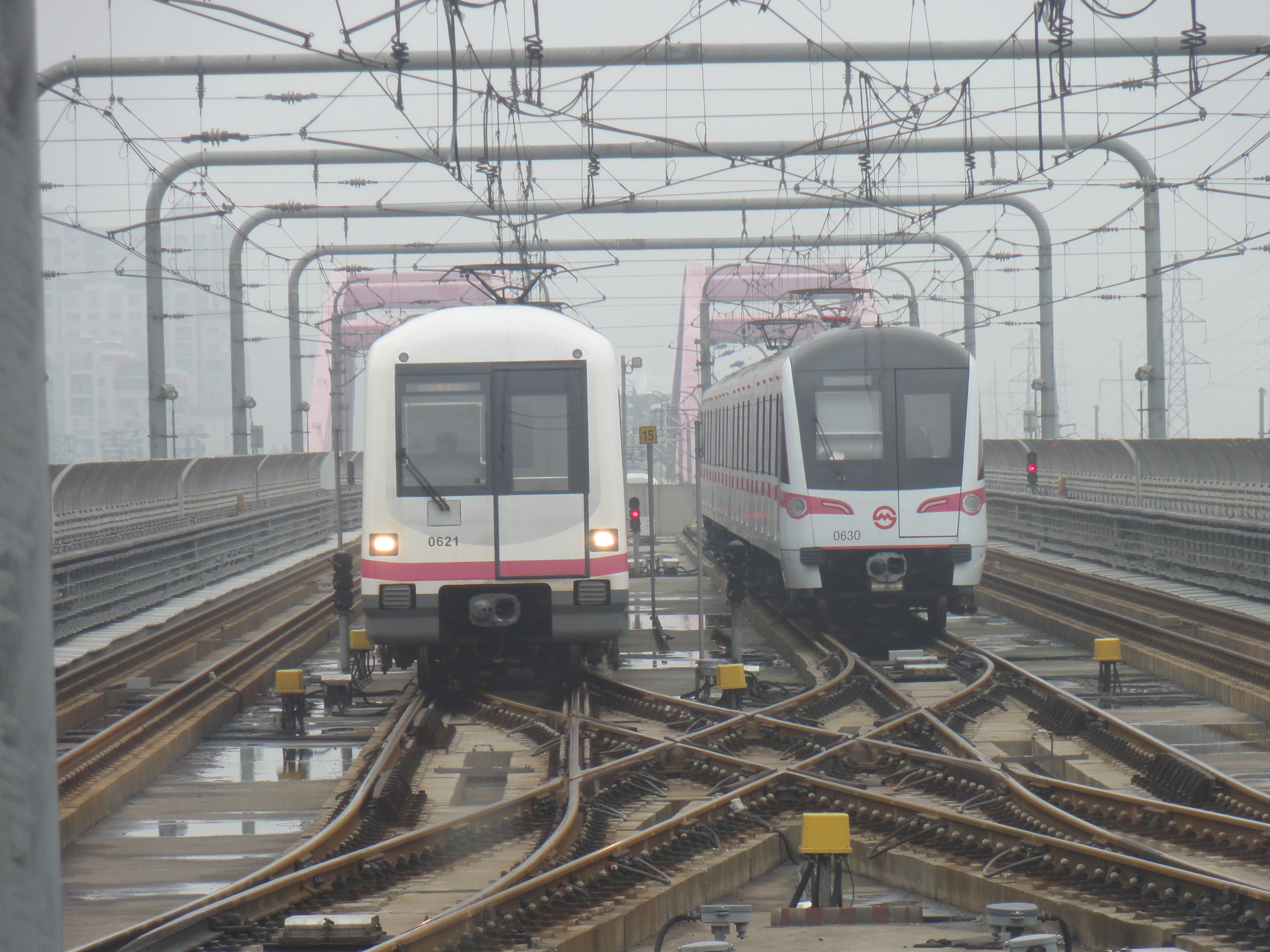
06C01 train on the left and 06C02 train on the right

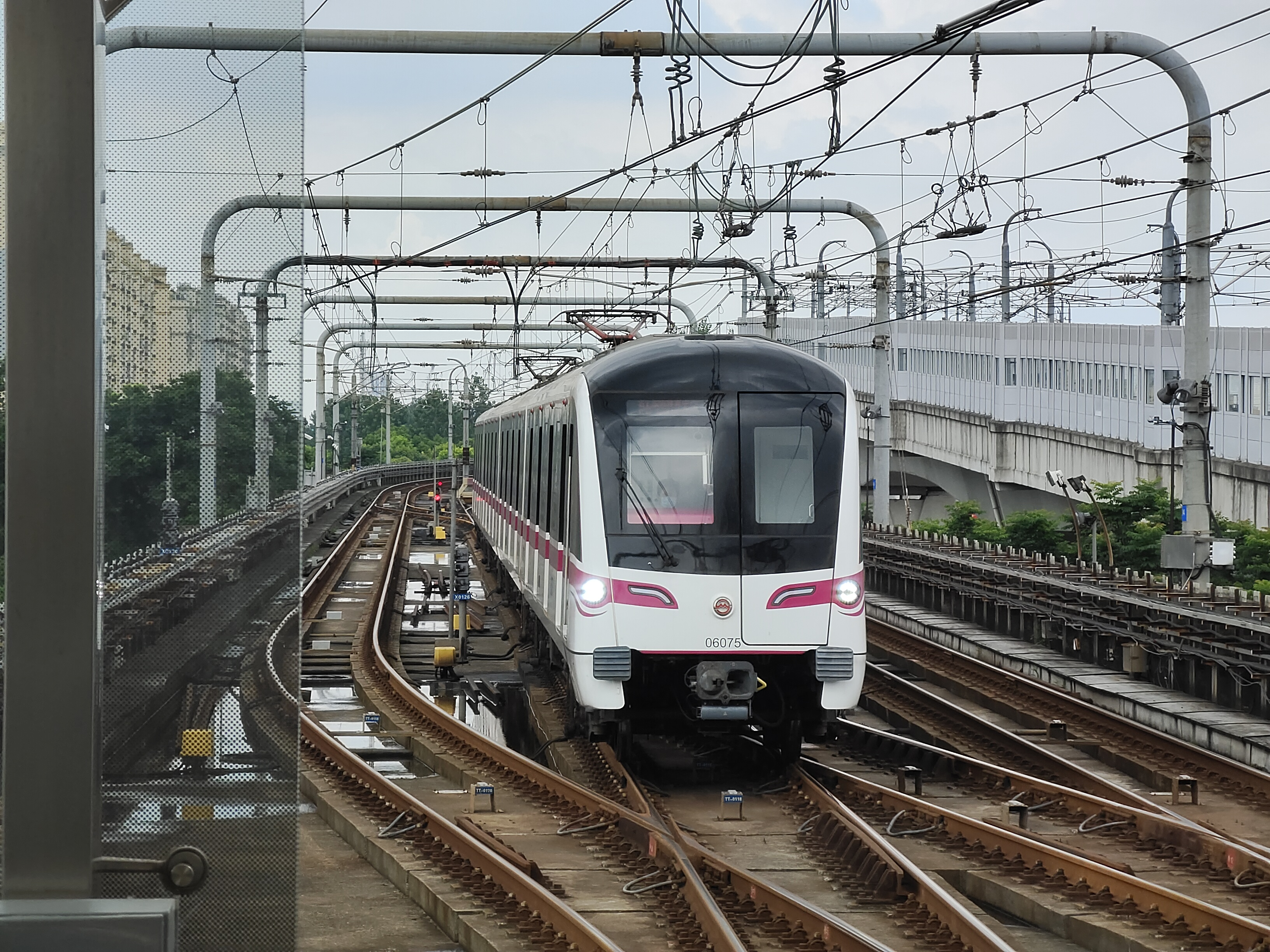
06C04 train
