= North Yanggao Road station =

Shanghai Metro station

North Yanggao Road 杨高北路
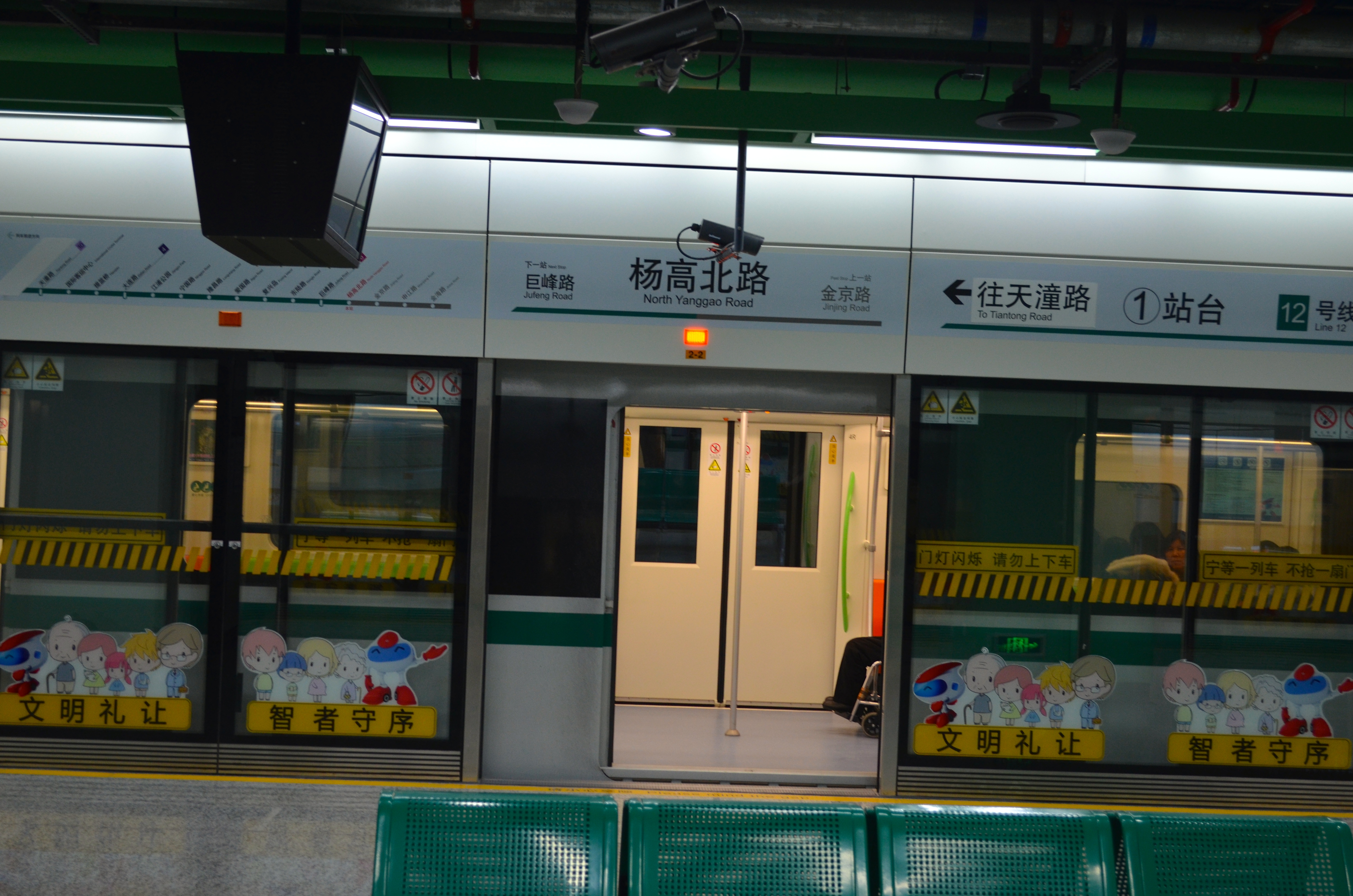
- Station platform

General information
- Location: Jufeng Road (巨峰路) and North Yanggao Road (杨高北路); Pudong, Shanghai; China
- Coordinates: 31.28222°N 121.5985°E
- Line: Line 12
- Platforms: 2 (1 island platform)
- Tracks: 2

Construction
- Structure type: Underground
- Accessible: Yes

History
- Opened: 29 December 2013

Services
Preceding station	Shanghai Metro	Following station
Jufeng Road towards Qixin Road	Line 12	Jinjing Road towards Jinhai Road
Location

North Yanggao Road (simplified Chinese: 杨高北路; traditional Chinese: 楊高北路; pinyin: Yánggāo Běi Lù) is a station on Line 12 of the Shanghai Metro in the Pudong New Area of Shanghai.
