= Gangcheng Road station =

Shanghai Metro station

Gangcheng Road 港城路
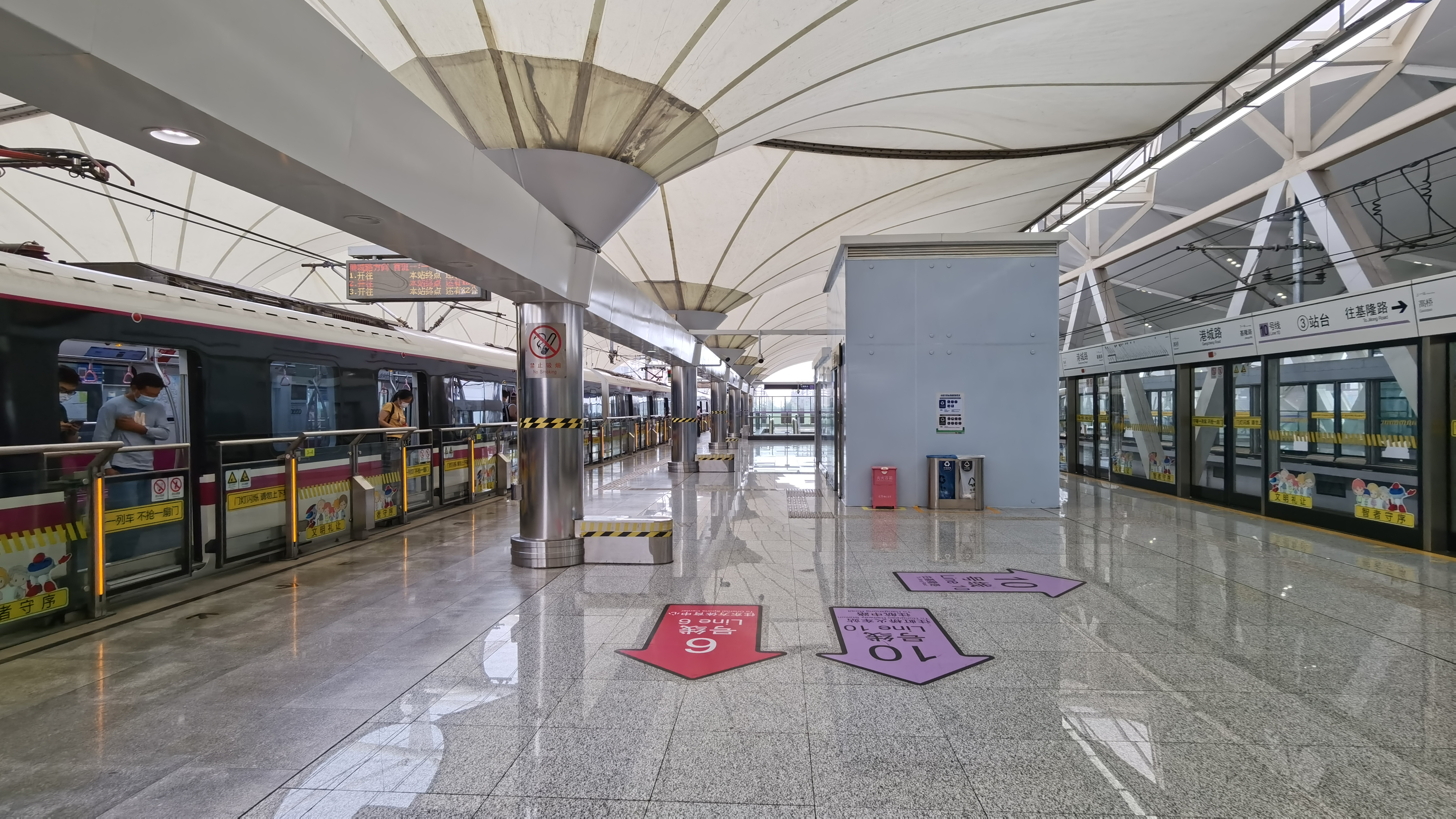
- Station platform with a Line 6 train

General information
- Location: Gangcheng Road and North Zhangyang Road; Pudong, Shanghai; China
- Coordinates: 31.355°N 121.57°E
- Operator: Shanghai No. 4 Metro Operation Co. Ltd. (Line 6); Shanghai No. 1 Metro Operation Co. Ltd. (Line 10)
- Lines: Line 6 Line 10
- Platforms: 4 (2 side platforms and 1 island platform)
- Tracks: 4

Construction
- Structure type: Elevated
- Accessible: Yes

Other information
- Station code: L10/33 (Line 10)

History
- Opened: 29 December 2007 (Line 6); 26 December 2020 (Line 10)

Services
| Preceding station | Shanghai Metro | Following station |
|---|---|---|
| Terminus | Line 6 | North Waigaoqiao Free Trade Zone towards Oriental Sports Center |
| Gaoqiao towards Hongqiao Railway Station or Hangzhong Road | Line 10 | Jilong Road Terminus |
Location
- Location within Shanghai

Gangcheng Road (Chinese: 港城路; pinyin: Gǎngchéng Lù) is a Shanghai Metro interchange station in Pudong, Shanghai, located at the intersection of Gangcheng Road and North Zhangyang Road. It is served by Lines 6 and 10. On Line 6, it is the northern terminus of the line. On Line 10, it is located between Jilong Road and Gaoqiao stations. It began operations on 29 December 2007, with the opening of Line 6. It became an interchange station with the opening of the second phase of Line 10. The extension was expected to open in 2018, however, due to construction delays, it finally opened on 26 December 2020.

The station is located near the Waigaoqiao section of the Shanghai Free-Trade Zone (formerly the Shanghai Waigaoqiao Free Trade Zone). However, the adjacent station to the east on Line 10, Jilong Road station, is located within the zone.

== Station layout ==
| 2F | Side platform, doors open on the right |
| 2F | Westbound | ← Line 10 towards Hongqiao Railway Station or Hangzhong Road (Gaoqiao) |
| 2F | Eastbound | Line 10 towards Jilong Road (Terminus) → |
| 2F | Island platform, doors open on the right |
| 2F | Northbound | ← Line 6 termination track |
| 2F | Southbound | Line 6 towards Oriental Sports Center (North Waigaoqiao Free Trade Zone) → |
| 2F | Side platform, doors open on the right |
| 1F | Concourse | Exits 1-2, fare gates, station agent |

As part of phase two of Line 10, the northern side platform of Line 6 has been converted to an island platform and extended to fit the longer trains on Line 10. An additional side platform was built further to the north. Since the opening of Line 10, this station features a cross-platform interchange between arriving passengers on Line 6 and Jilong Road station-bound passengers on Line 10. It is the only elevated cross-platform interchange on the entire Shanghai Metro network.
