= Oriental Sports Center station =

Shanghai Metro interchange station

Oriental Sports Center 东方体育中心
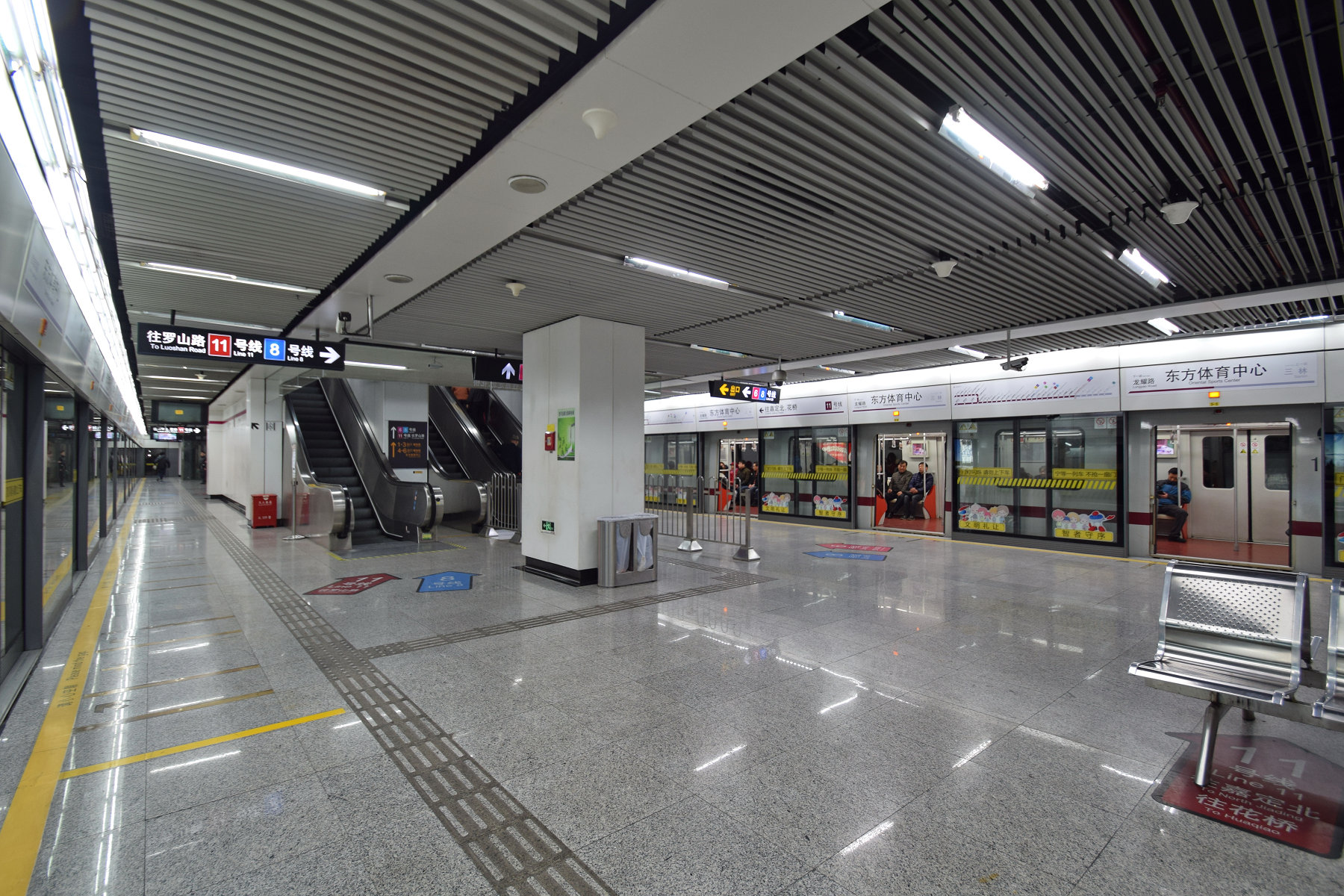
- Platform for Line 6 and North Jiading or Huaqiao-bound Line 11 trains

General information
- Location: Yaoti Road (耀体路) and Yaolong Road (耀龙路); Pudong, Shanghai; China
- Coordinates: 31°9′19.22″N 121°28′32.84″E
- Operator: Shanghai No.2/4 Metro Operation Co. Ltd.
- Lines: Line 6; Line 8; Line 11
- Platforms: 6 (3 island platforms)
- Tracks: 6

Construction
- Structure type: Underground
- Accessible: Yes

History
- Opened: 20 April 2010 (intra-station interchange Lines 6 and 8); 12 April 2011 (exits); 31 August 2013 (Line 11)
- Former names: Jiyang Road (up to 7 May 2011)

Services
Preceding station	Shanghai Metro	Following station
South Lingyan Road towards Gangcheng Road	Line 6	Terminus
Yangsi towards Shiguang Road	Line 8	Lingzhao Xincun towards Shendu Highway
Longyao Road towards North Jiading or Huaqiao	Line 11	Sanlin towards Disney Resort
Location
- Location within Shanghai

Oriental Sports Center (东方体育中心) formerly known as Jiyang Road (济阳路), is an interchange station between Lines 6, 8 and 11 of the Shanghai Metro. It is the first cross-platform interchange in Shanghai as well as the southern terminus of Line 6; it is also the first station in Pudong when heading southeast-bound on Line 11 towards Disney Resort.

The station opened as an interchange station between lines 6 and 8 on 20 April 2010. Due to previous constructions on Line 11 and the nearby sports stadium, the station only allowed line transfers and exits to the surface only opened on 12 April 2011. From 31 August 2013 line 11 also operated this station.

== Station layout ==
1F	Ground level	Exits
B1	Concourse	Tickets, Service Center
B2	Platform 5	← Line 8 towards Shiguang Road (Yangsi)
B2	Island platform, doors open on the left
B2	Platform 6	Line 8 towards Shendu Highway (Lingzhao Xincun) →
B3	Platform 1	← Line 11 towards North Jiading or Huaqiao (Longyao Road)
B3	Island platform, doors open on the right for Line 6, left for Line 11
B3	Platform 2	← Line 6 termination track
B3	Platform 3	Line 6 towards Gangcheng Road (South Lingyan Road) →
B3	Island platform, doors open on the right for Line 6, left for Line 11
B3	Platform 4	Line 11 towards Disney Resort (Sanlin) →

=== Entrances/exits ===
- 1: Yangsi Road (W)
- 2: Yangsi Road (W)
- 3: Yangsi Road (W)
- 4: Yangsi Road (W)
- 5: Yangsi Road (W)
- 6: Yangsi Road (W)

== Surrounding area ==
- Shanghai Oriental Sports Center
