= Fangdian Road station =

Shanghai Metro station

Fangdian Road 芳甸路
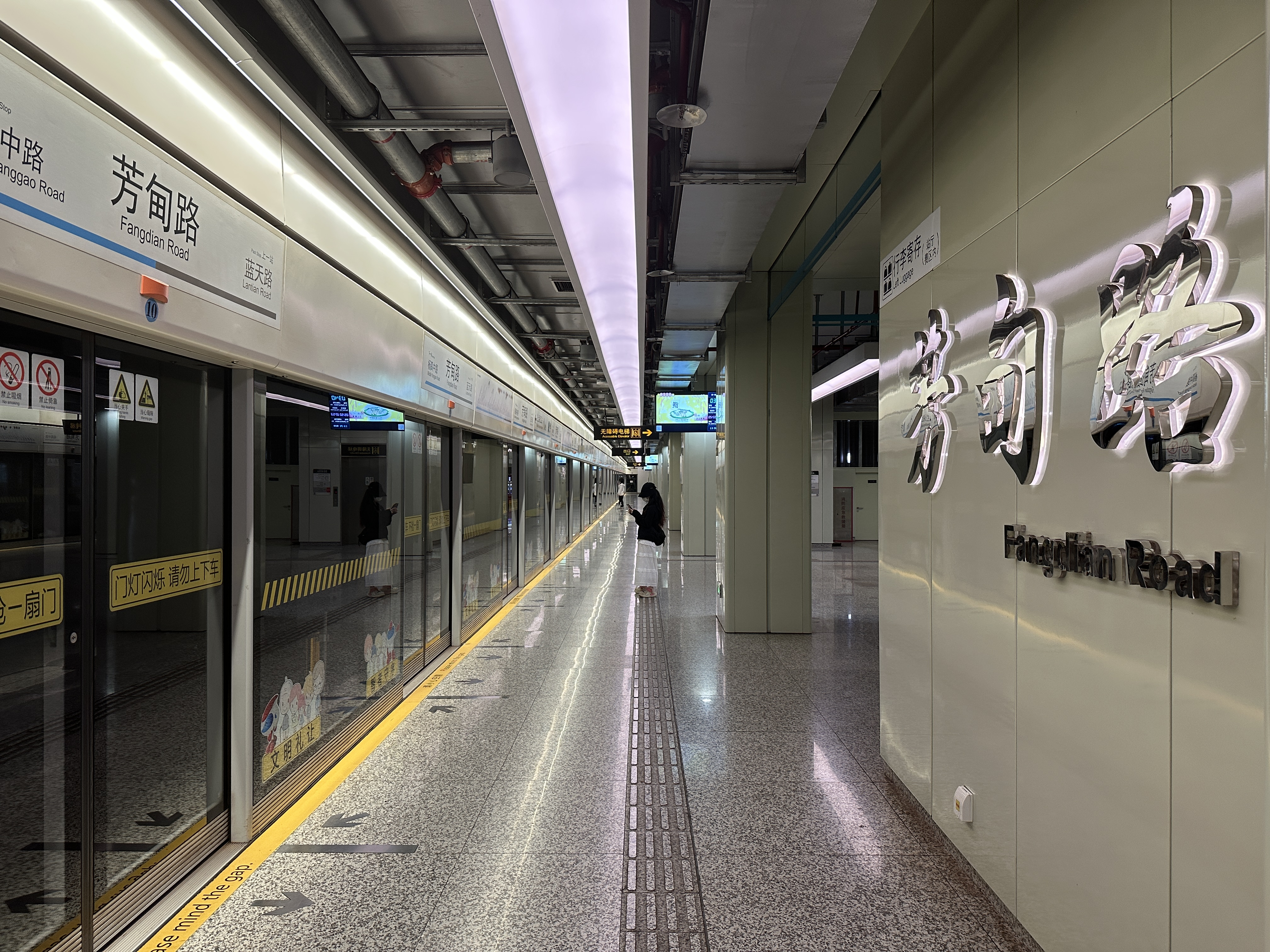
- Station platform

General information
- Location: Fangdian Road and Middle Yanggao Road; Pudong New Area, Shanghai; China
- Coordinates: 31.233944°N 121.554306°E
- Operator: Shanghai No. 1 Metro Operation Co. Ltd.
- Line: Line 9
- Platforms: 2 (1 island platform)
- Tracks: 2

Construction
- Structure type: Underground
- Accessible: Yes

History
- Opened: December 30, 2017

Services
Preceding station	Shanghai Metro	Following station
Middle Yanggao Road towards Shanghai Songjiang Railway Station	Line 9	Lantian Road towards Caolu
Location
- Location within Shanghai

Fangdian Road (Chinese: 芳甸路; pinyin: Fāngdiàn Lù) is a station on Line 9 of the Shanghai Metro. The station is located on Middle Yanggao Road at Fangdian Road, between Middle Yanggao Road and Lantian Road. It began passenger trial operation with the rest of phase 3 of Line 9, an easterly extension with 9 new stations, on December 30, 2017.

== Station layout ==
1F	Ground level	Exits
B1	Concourse	Tickets, Service Center, Convenient stores
B2	Platform 1	← Line 9 towards Shanghai Songjiang Railway Station (Middle Yanggao Road)
B2	Island platform, doors open on the left
B2	Platform 2	Line 9 towards Caolu (Lantian Road) →

== Entrances/exits ==
- 1: Yanggao Road (M)
- 2: Yanggao Road (M), Fangdian Road
- 3: Yanggao Road (M), Nanyangjing Road

== Nearby Places ==
- Shanghai Jincai Experimental Junior Middle School
