= Linyi Xincun station =

Shanghai Metro station

Linyi Xincun 临沂新村
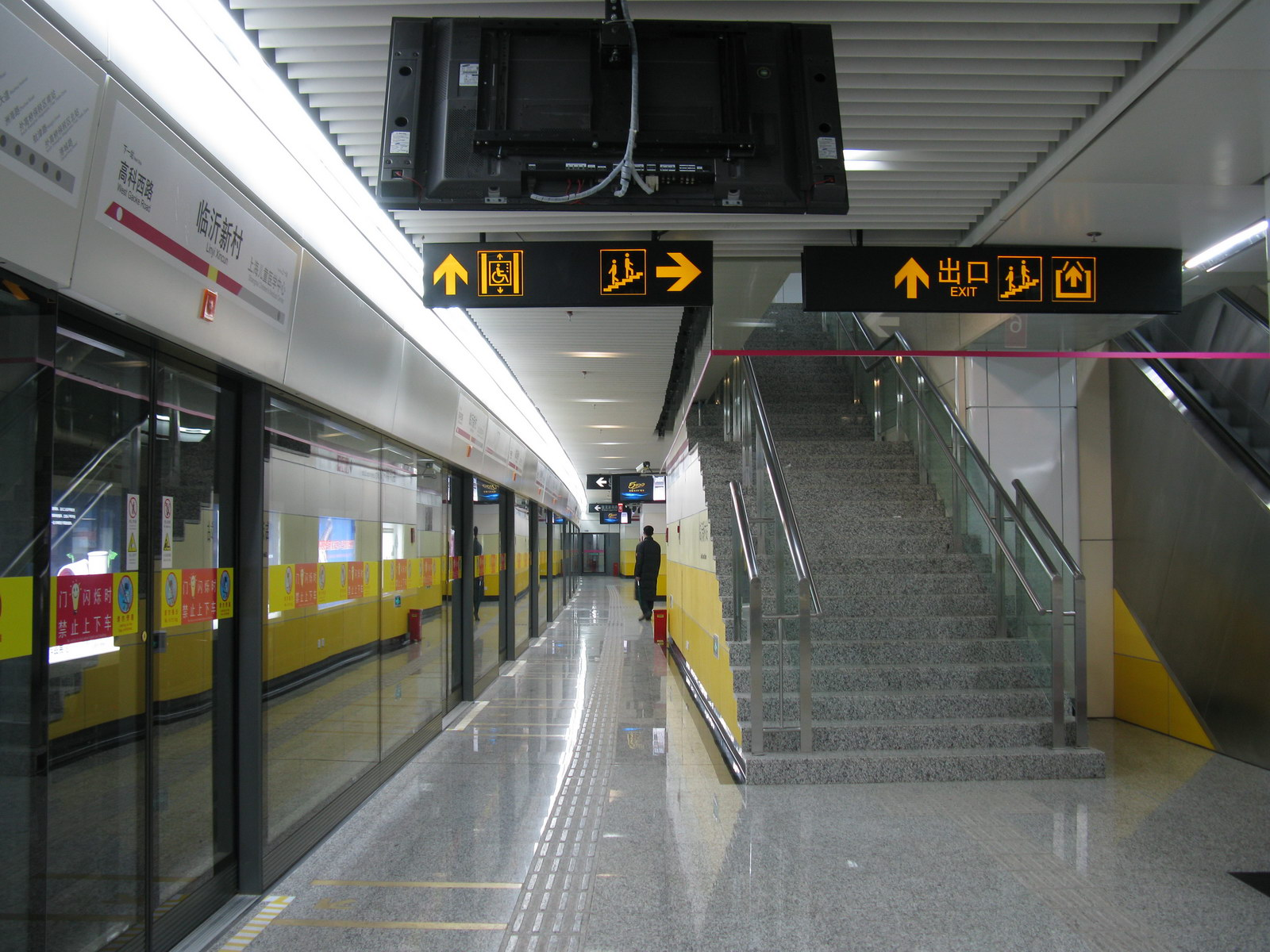
- Platform at the underground station

General information
- Location: Dongfang Road, Pusan Road (浦三路) and Lanling Road (兰陵路); Pudong, Shanghai; China
- Coordinates: 31°11′41″N 121°30′42″E
- Operator: Shanghai No. 4 Metro Operation Co. Ltd.
- Line: Line 6
- Platforms: 2 (1 island platform)
- Tracks: 2

Construction
- Structure type: Underground
- Accessible: Yes

History
- Opened: December 29, 2007

Services
Preceding station	Shanghai Metro	Following station
Shanghai Children's Medical Center towards Gangcheng Road	Line 6	West Gaoke Road towards Oriental Sports Center
Location
- Location within Shanghai

Linyi Xincun (simplified Chinese: 临沂新村; traditional Chinese: 臨沂新村; pinyin: Línyí Xīncūn) is a station on Line 6 of the Shanghai Metro. It began services on December 29, 2007.
