= Shanghai Premier League =

Chinese football league

Shanghai Premier League a.k.a. SPL is an amateur football (soccer) league based in Pudong, Shanghai, aiming mainly at the expatriate community. Shanghai Premier League was founded in 2003 when 5 existing amateur teams, among which the Shanghai Traffic Police team, who hitherto played only on occasional fixtures, decided to group themselves and play in a double round-robin league format. Simultaneously a Shanghai Premier League Cup is also played. The league's season runs from October to June, with a start tournament to kick off the season and an end tournament to close the season. Occasionally special tournaments and events are held.

== Special Events ==
- Shanghai Premier League Santa Cup is a one-day 11-a-side tournament occasionally held during winter break.
- Shanghai Premier League World Cup is an event which is held usually at the start of the summer to coincide with the FIFA World Cup. It has been covered by the local media.

== Teams ==
=== 2012/2013 League ===
Team	Nationality	First season	Former names
Bulls of Bosporus	Turkey, Germany	2003–2004	
Cowboys	China	2011–2012	
Etoile Rouge de Shanghai	France	2005–2006	
Flamenkos	Belgium, Spain	2003–2004	FC Vlis
Galacticos	various	2006–2007	
Gremio	Italy, Brazil, China	2006–2007	Hawks
Shanghai Marlins	various	2008–2009	Hard Day Night FC, Dulwich United, Dulwich Foxes
Shanghai Lions Football Club	France, United States, Netherlands	2003–2004	
Shanghai Japan Football Club	Japan	2003–2004	
Super 48	Japan	2009–2010	
Shanghai 2000	China	2012–2013	
Stoke City Men's Team Shanghai	China	2013–	

== Champions and Cup holders ==
Season	Champion	Runner up	Cup holder
2006–2007	Lions	FC Vlis	Lions
2007–2008	Lions	Galacticos	Qilin
2008–2009	Hawks	Lions	Galacticos
2009–2010	Lions	Japan FC	Lions
2010–2011	Lions	Flamenkos	Lions
2011–2012	Hawks	Hard Days Night (HDN)	Hawks
