= Huangyang Road station =

Metro station in Shanghai, China

Huangyang Road 黄杨路
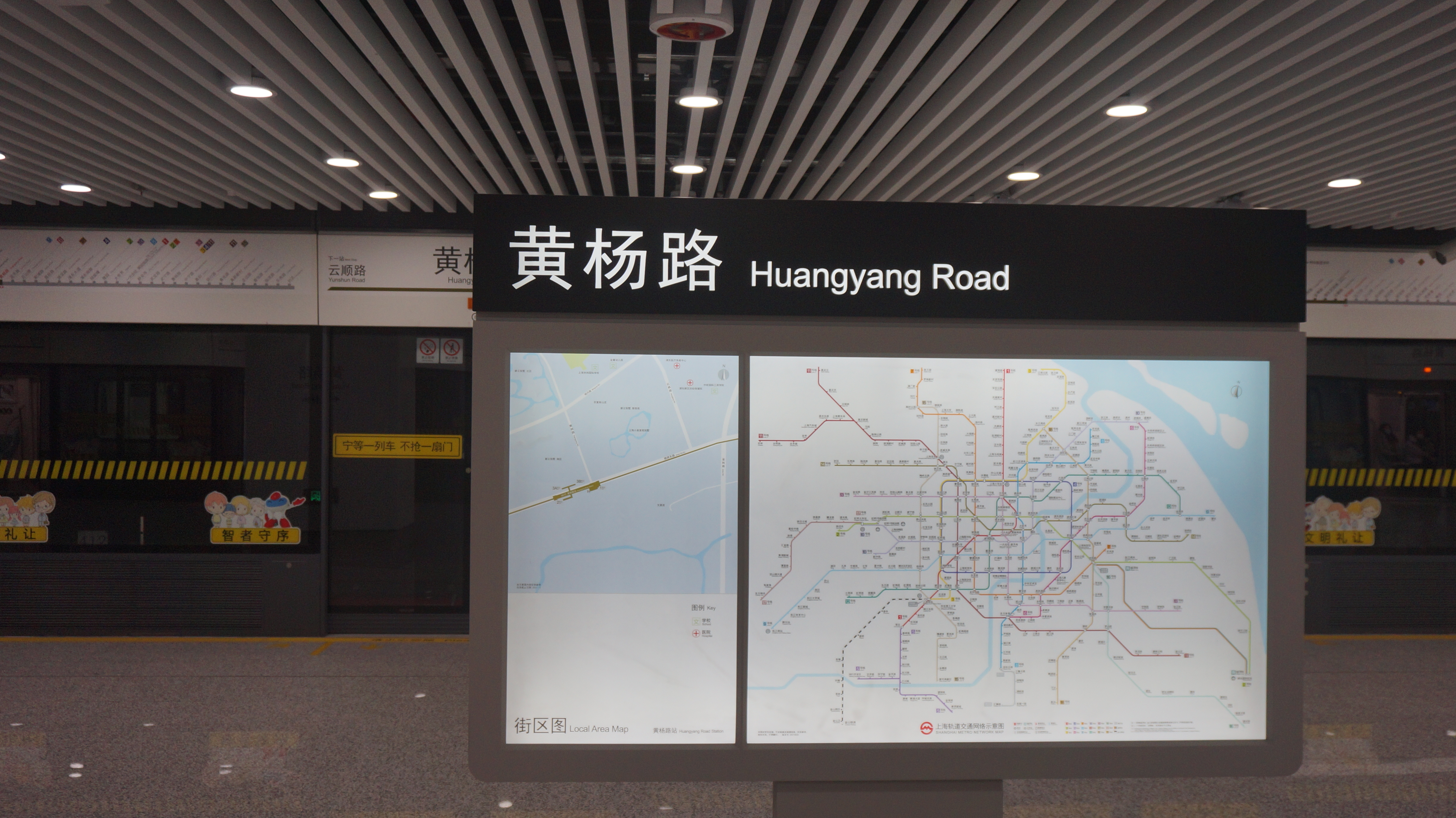
- Platform

General information
- Location: Huangyang Road and East Jinxiu Road, Pudong, Shanghai; China
- Coordinates: 31.236146°N 121.586886°E
- Line: Line 14
- Platforms: 2 (1 island platform)
- Tracks: 2

Construction
- Structure type: Underground
- Accessible: Yes

History
- Opened: 30 December 2021

Services
Preceding station	Shanghai Metro	Following station
Lantian Road towards Fengbang	Line 14	Yunshun Road towards Guiqiao Road
Location

Huangyang Road (Chinese: 黄杨路) is a station that is part of Line 14 of the Shanghai Metro. Located at the intersection of Huangyang Road and East Jinxiu Road in Pudong, the station opened with the rest of Line 14 on December 30, 2021.
