= Taierzhuang Road station =

Shanghai Metro station

Taierzhuang Road 台儿庄路
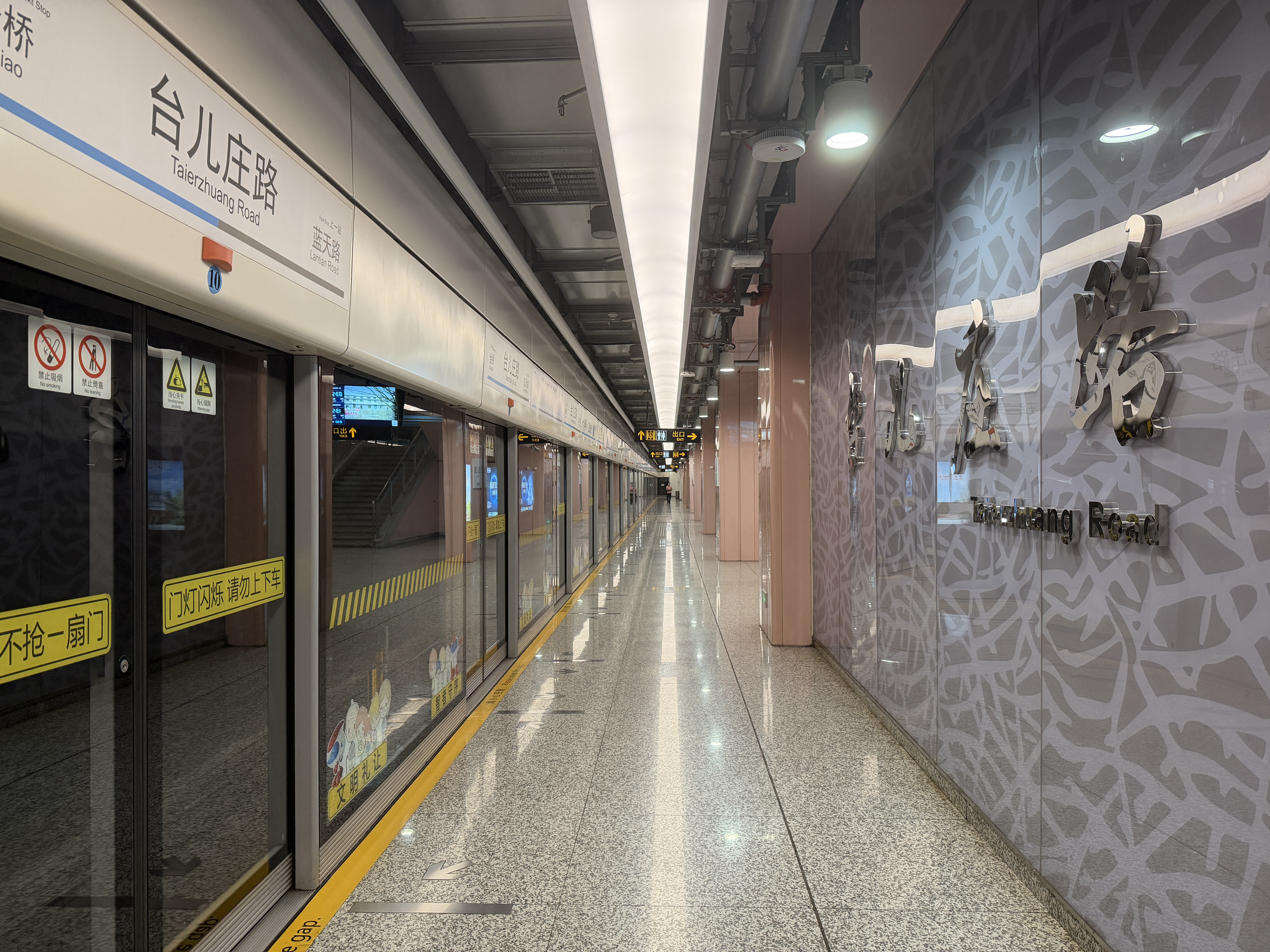
- Station platform

General information
- Location: Taierzhuang Road (台儿庄路) and Middle Yanggao Road; Pudong New Area, Shanghai; China
- Coordinates: 31.255058°N 121.593795°E
- Operator: Shanghai No. 1 Metro Operation Co. Ltd.
- Line: Line 9
- Platforms: 2 (1 island platform)
- Tracks: 2

Construction
- Structure type: Underground
- Accessible: Yes

History
- Opened: December 30, 2017

Services
| Preceding station | Shanghai Metro | Following station |
|---|---|---|
| Lantian Road towards Shanghai Songjiang Railway Station | Line 9 | Jinqiao towards Caolu |
Location
- Location within Shanghai

Taierzhuang Road (simplified Chinese: 台儿庄路; traditional Chinese: 台兒莊路; pinyin: Tái'érzhuāng Lù) is a station on Line 9 of the Shanghai Metro. The station is located on Middle Yanggao Road at Tai'erzhuang Road, between Lantian Road and Jinqiao. It began passenger trial operation with the rest of phase 3 of Line 9, an easterly extension with 9 new stations, on December 30, 2017.

== Name ==
Under Hanyu Pinyin conventions, the correct transliteration of this name should contain an apostrophe, being Tai'erzhuang Road.
