= Pudong =

District in Shanghai, People's Republic of China

Pudong 浦东新区
- District & State-level new area
- Pudong New Area
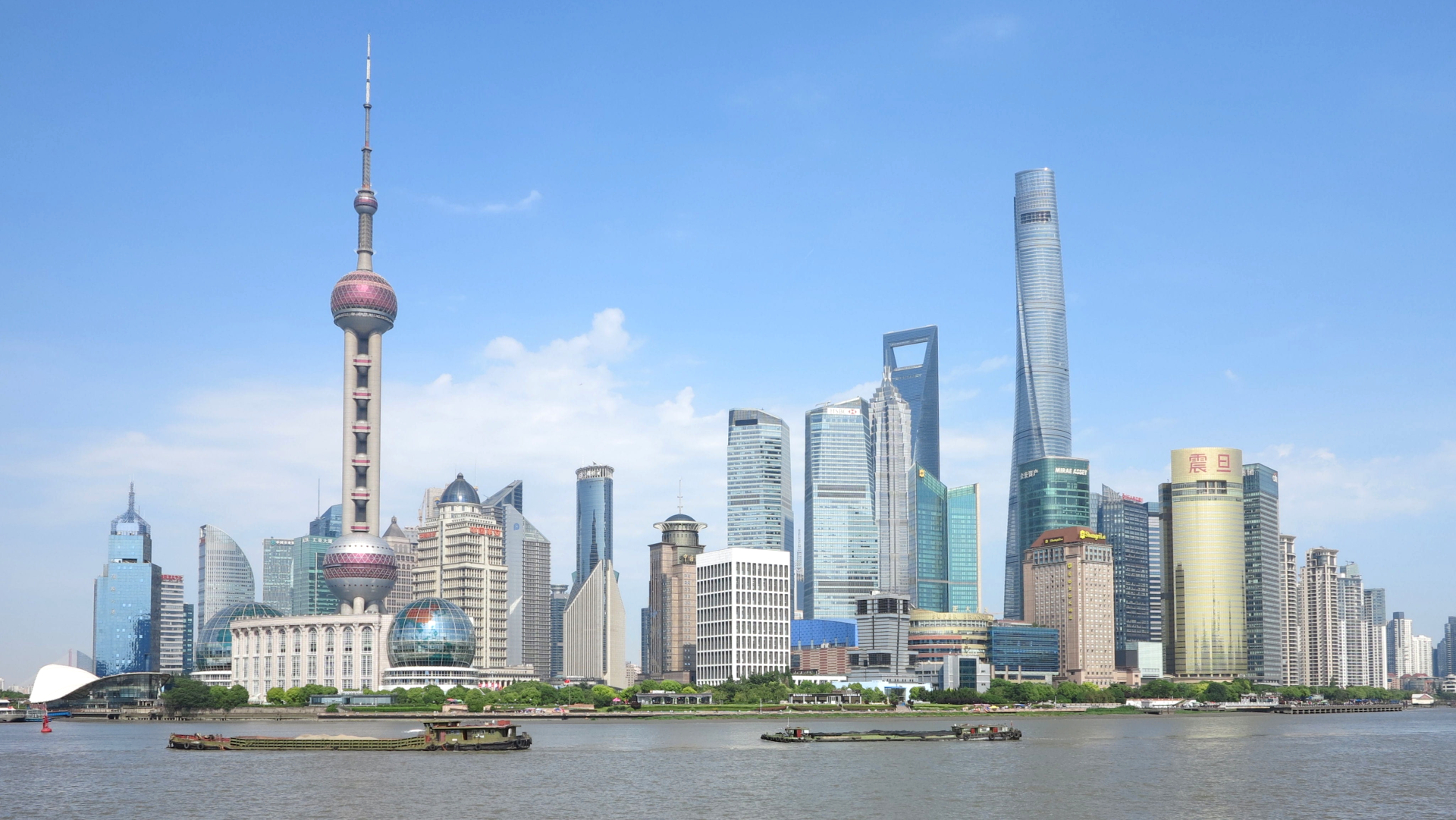
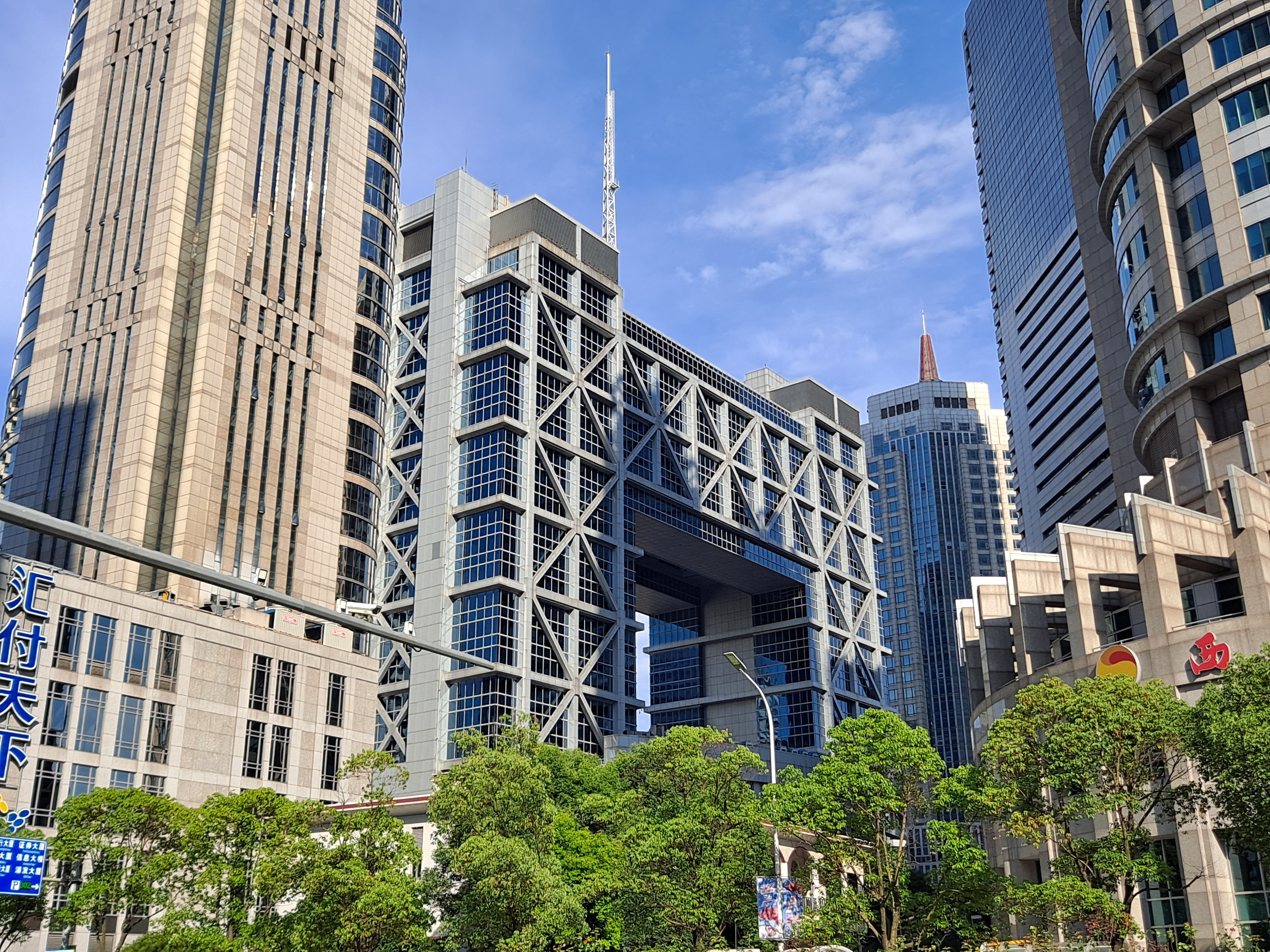
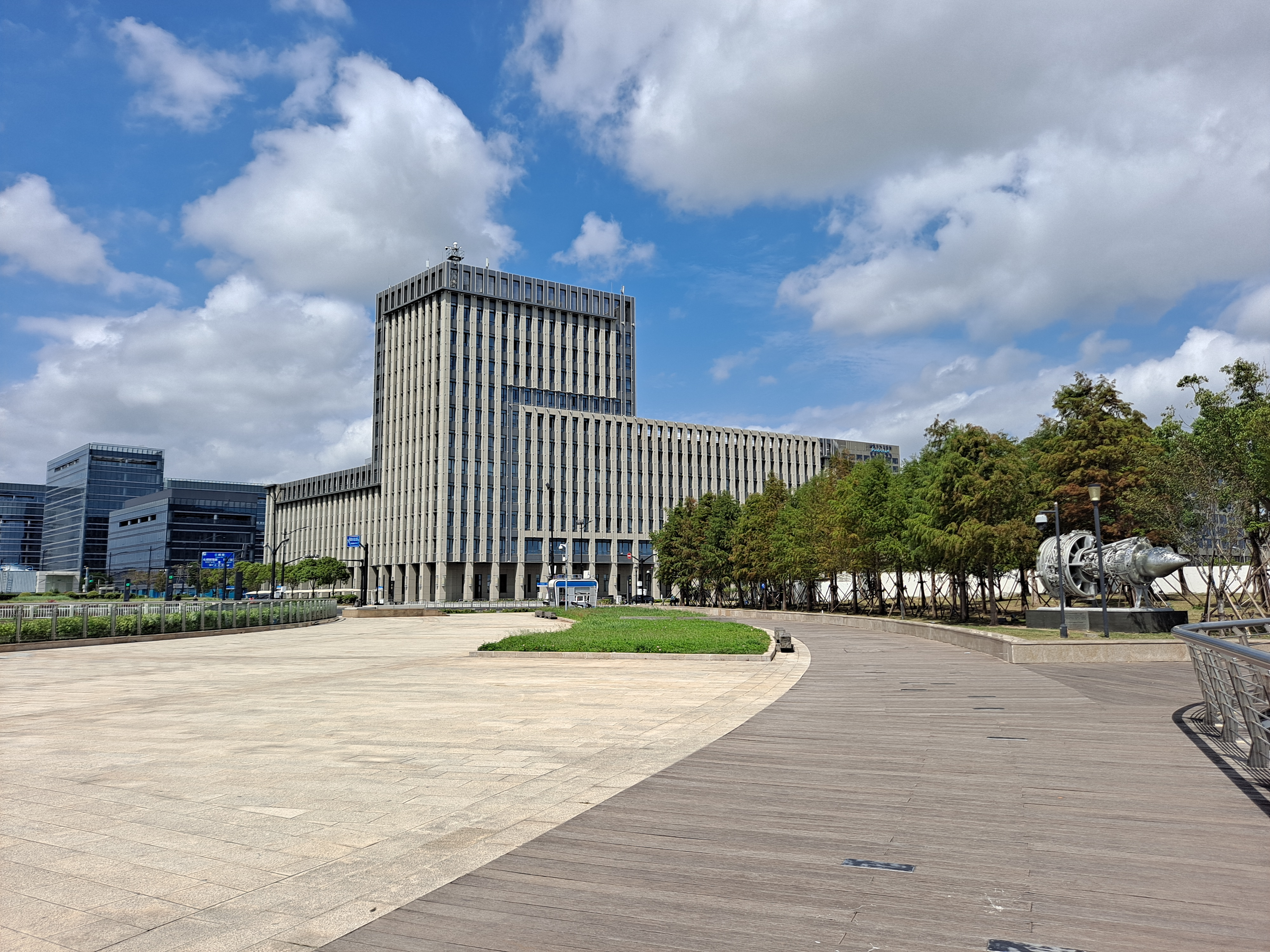
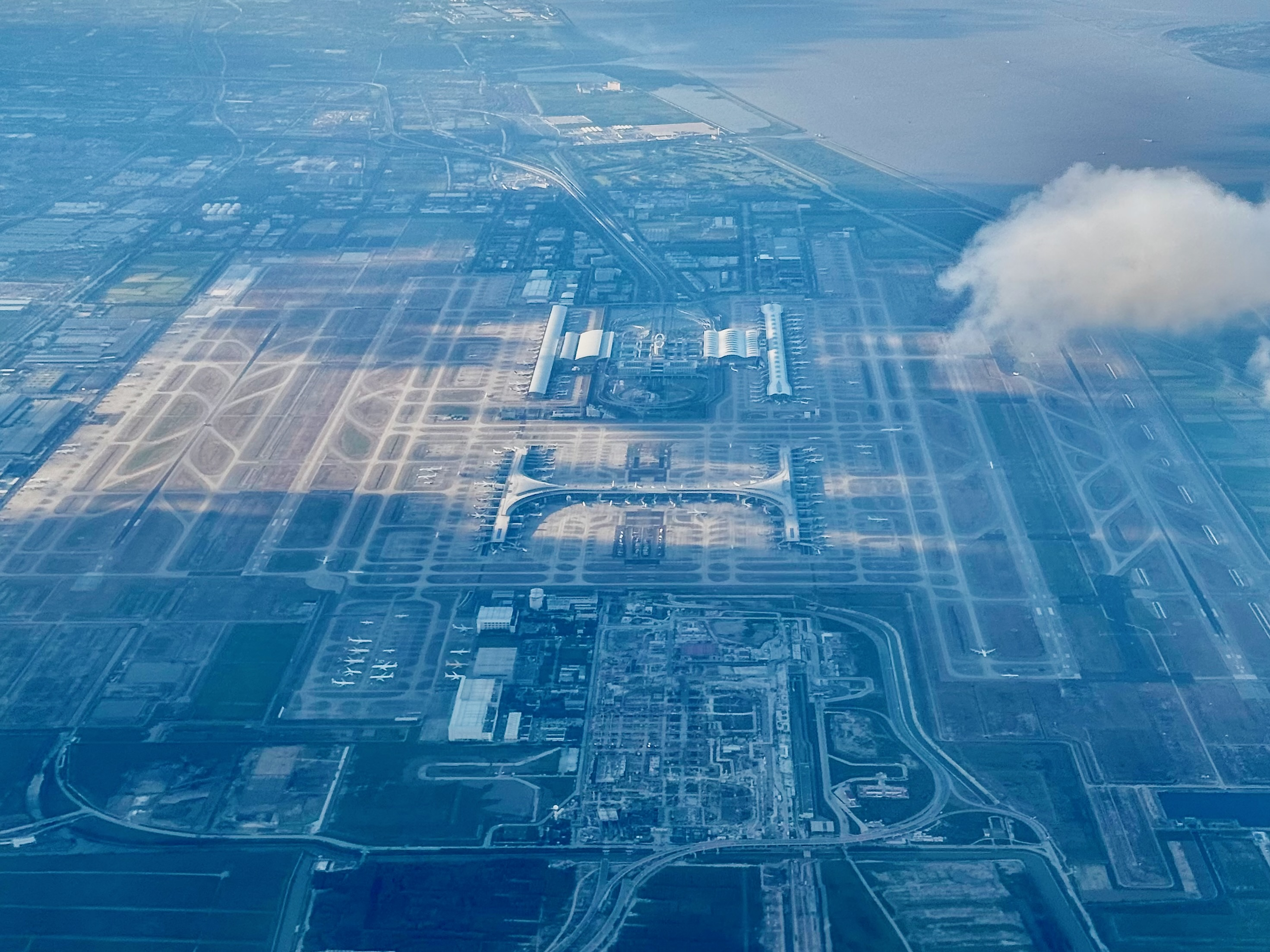
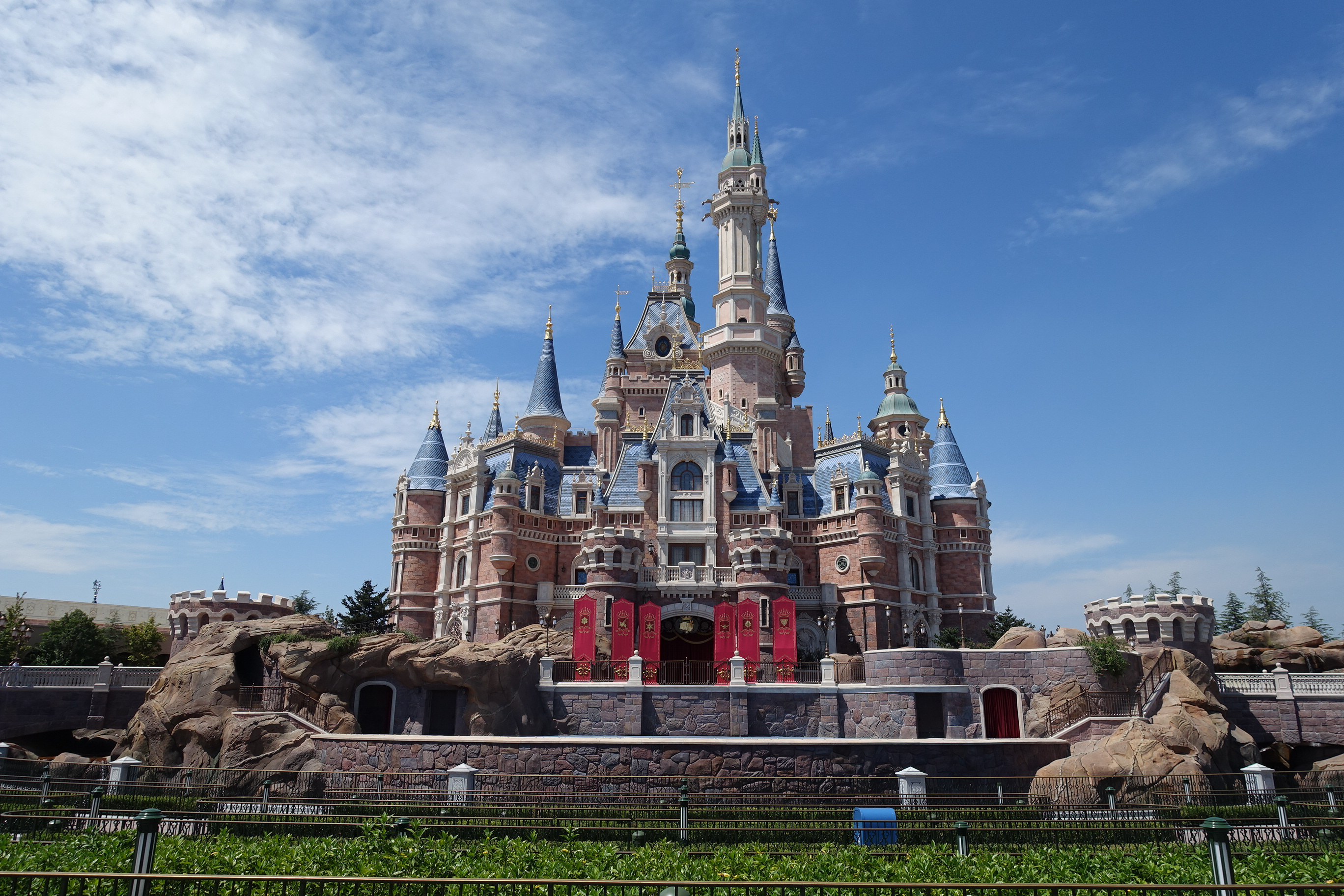
- Skyline of Lujiazui from the Bund Shanghai Stock Exchange Nanhui New City Shanghai Pudong International Airport Shanghai Disney Resort

- Location within Shanghai
- Coordinates: 31°14′05″N 121°30′23″E
- Country: People's Republic of China
- Municipality: Shanghai
- District Gov't Established: 1993

Government
  - CPC Pudong District Secretary: Li Zheng (李政)
  - District Governor: Wu Jincheng (吴金城)

Area
  - Total: 1,210.4 km^{2} (467.3 sq mi)

Population (2020)
  - Total: 5,681,512
  - Density: 4,693.9/km^{2} (12,157/sq mi)

GDP (nominal) (2025)
  - Total: CN¥ 1.88 trillion US$ 263 billion
  - Per capita: CN¥ 323,682; US$ 45,315
- Time zone: UTC+08:00 (China Standard Time)
- Postal code: 200120
- Area code: 021
- Website: pudong.gov.cn

Pudong
- "Pudong" in Simplified (top) and Traditional (bottom) Chinese characters
- Simplified Chinese: 浦东
- Traditional Chinese: 浦東
- Wugniu: phu^{3} ton^{1}
- Postal: Pootung
- Literal meaning: "East of the Pu [River]"
Transcriptions
Standard Mandarin
- Hanyu Pinyin: Pǔdōng
- Wade–Giles: P'u^{3}-tung^{1}
- IPA: [pʰù.tʊ́ŋ]
Wu
- Wugniu: phu^{3} ton^{1}
- IPA: Shanghainese: [pʰu˧ toŋ˦]
Yue: Cantonese
- Jyutping: pou^{2} dung^{1}
- IPA: [pʰɔw˧˥.tʊŋ˥]

Pudong New Area
- Simplified Chinese: 浦东新区
- Traditional Chinese: 浦東新區
- Wugniu: phu^{3} ton^{1} sin^{1} chiu^{1}
Transcriptions
Standard Mandarin
- Hanyu Pinyin: Pǔdōng Xīnqū
- IPA: [pʰù.tʊ́ŋ ɕín.tɕʰý]
Wu
- Wugniu: phu^{3} ton^{1} sin^{1} chiu^{1}
- IPA: Shanghainese: [pʰu˧ toŋ˦ ɕin˧ tɕʰy˨]
Yue: Cantonese
- Jyutping: pou^{2} dung^{1} san^{1} keoi^{1}
- IPA: [pʰɔw˧˥.tʊŋ˥ sɐn˥.kʰɵɥ˥]

Pudong is a district of Shanghai located east of the Huangpu, the river which flows through central Shanghai. The name Pudong was originally applied to the Huangpu's east bank, directly across from the west bank or Puxi, the historic city center. It now refers to the broader Pudong New Area, a state-level new area which extends all the way to the East China Sea.

The traditional area of Pudong is now home to the Lujiazui Finance and Trade Zone and the Shanghai Stock Exchange and many of Shanghai's best-known buildings, such as the Oriental Pearl Tower, the Jin Mao Tower, the Shanghai World Financial Center, and the Shanghai Tower. These modern skyscrapers directly face Puxi's historic Bund, a remnant of former foreign concessions in China. The rest of the new area includes the Port of Shanghai, the Shanghai Expo and Century Park, Zhangjiang Hi-Tech Park, Shanghai Pudong International Airport, the Jiuduansha Wetland Nature Reserve, Nanhui New City, and the Shanghai Disney Resort.

== History ==
Pudong—literally "The East Bank of the Huangpu River"—originally referred only to the less-developed land across from Shanghai's Old City and foreign concessions. The area was mainly farmland and only slowly developed, with warehouses and wharfs near the shore administered by the districts of Puxi on the west bank: Huangpu, Yangpu, and Nanshi. Pudong was originally established as a county in 1958 until 1961 when the county was split among Huangpu, Yangpu, Nanshi, Wusong and Chuansha County.

Premier Li Peng announced the policy of Pudong's opening and development on April 18, 1990. Speaking at a celebration for the fifth anniversary of the Shanghai Volkswagen Corporation, Li stated that "some policies of the economic and technological zones and Special Economic Zones can be implemented in the Pudong area". Li stated that future investors from Hong Kong, Macau, and Taiwan were welcomed and that China would provide preferential conditions for cooperation and improve the investment environment. The occasion is often described as Pudong's "birthday". Nonetheless, development in the area was slow for the rest of 1990.

On October 1, 1992, the original area of Pudong County and Chuansha County merged and established Pudong New Area.

In 1993, the Chinese government set up a Special Economic Zone in Chuansha, creating the Pudong New Area. Deng Xiaoping had initiated its development three years earlier to build further confidence in Reform and Opening Up. Pudong's description as a New Area served to distinguish it from existing SEZs. It had even more open policies than existing SEZs, in terms of attracting foreign direct investment and developing the local economy.

The western tip of the Pudong district was designated as the Lujiazui Finance and Trade Zone and has become a financial hub of modern China. Several landmark buildings were constructed, including the Oriental Pearl Tower, and the supertall Jin Mao Building (420.5 m or 1,380 ft), Shanghai World Financial Center (494 m or 1,621 ft) and Shanghai Tower (632 m or 2,073 ft), the world's first trio of adjacent supertall skyscrapers. These buildings—all along Century Avenue and visible from the historic Bund—now form the most common skyline of Shanghai.

In official discourses on urbanization in China, Pudong is considered the paradigmatic example of the 1990s approach to urbanization.

On May 6, 2009, it was disclosed that the State Council had approved the proposal to merge Nanhui District with Pudong and comprise the majority of eastern Shanghai. In 2010, Pudong was host to the main venues of the Shanghai Expo, whose grounds now form a public park.

Pudong New Area consists of the original Pudong County (northeastern portion of Shanghai County), Chuansha County, and Nanhui County.

== Climate ==
Pudong has a humid subtropical climate (Köppen climate classification Cfa), influenced by monsoons and Siberian winds as well as rains and typhoons from the Pacific. The average annual temperature in Pudong is 17.2 °C (63.0 °F). The temperatures are highest on average in July and August, at around 28.6 °C (83.5 °F), and lowest in January, at around 5.1 °C (41.2 °F).

Climate data for Pudong, elevation 4 m (13 ft), (1991–2020 normals, extremes 1981–present)
Month	Jan	Feb	Mar	Apr	May	Jun	Jul	Aug	Sep	Oct	Nov	Dec	Year
Record high °C (°F)	23.9 (75.0)	27.6 (81.7)	31.6 (88.9)	33.8 (92.8)	35.4 (95.7)	37.2 (99.0)	40.6 (105.1)	40.9 (105.6)	37.0 (98.6)	35.6 (96.1)	29.7 (85.5)	24.8 (76.6)	40.9 (105.6)
Mean daily maximum °C (°F)	8.9 (48.0)	10.7 (51.3)	15.1 (59.2)	20.7 (69.3)	25.4 (77.7)	28.0 (82.4)	32.8 (91.0)	32.3 (90.1)	28.4 (83.1)	23.6 (74.5)	18.1 (64.6)	11.6 (52.9)	21.3 (70.3)
Daily mean °C (°F)	5.1 (41.2)	6.7 (44.1)	10.6 (51.1)	15.9 (60.6)	20.9 (69.6)	24.2 (75.6)	28.7 (83.7)	28.5 (83.3)	24.7 (76.5)	19.7 (67.5)	13.9 (57.0)	7.6 (45.7)	17.2 (63.0)
Mean daily minimum °C (°F)	2.1 (35.8)	3.4 (38.1)	6.9 (44.4)	11.8 (53.2)	17.1 (62.8)	21.2 (70.2)	25.5 (77.9)	25.6 (78.1)	21.7 (71.1)	16.2 (61.2)	10.4 (50.7)	4.3 (39.7)	13.9 (56.9)
Record low °C (°F)	−7.4 (18.7)	−5.1 (22.8)	−2.3 (27.9)	2.5 (36.5)	8.3 (46.9)	14.1 (57.4)	17.2 (63.0)	19.0 (66.2)	13.4 (56.1)	6.8 (44.2)	−1.7 (28.9)	−6.2 (20.8)	−7.4 (18.7)
Average precipitation mm (inches)	77.2 (3.04)	69.8 (2.75)	85.1 (3.35)	87.1 (3.43)	91.1 (3.59)	231.1 (9.10)	154.2 (6.07)	227.0 (8.94)	136.3 (5.37)	78.1 (3.07)	70.4 (2.77)	57.1 (2.25)	1,364.5 (53.73)
Average precipitation days (≥ 0.1 mm)	10.6	10.8	12.2	11.0	11.3	14.4	12.2	13.3	10.7	7.5	9.7	9.0	132.7
Average snowy days	2.0	1.7	0.6	0	0	0	0	0	0	0	0	0.8	5.1
Average relative humidity (%)	73	74	72	71	74	82	78	79	77	73	75	71	75
Mean monthly sunshine hours	107.1	111.1	147.0	168.4	173.1	120.0	189.8	191.4	156.8	152.3	122.7	123.4	1,763.1
Percentage possible sunshine	33	35	39	43	41	28	44	47	43	44	39	40	40
Source: China Meteorological Administration All-time September high

Climate data for Huinan Town, elevation 5 m (16 ft), (1991–2020 normals, extremes 1981–2013)
Month	Jan	Feb	Mar	Apr	May	Jun	Jul	Aug	Sep	Oct	Nov	Dec	Year
Record high °C (°F)	22.1 (71.8)	25.6 (78.1)	27.4 (81.3)	31.7 (89.1)	34.3 (93.7)	35.5 (95.9)	39.0 (102.2)	40.1 (104.2)	36.6 (97.9)	32.2 (90.0)	27.6 (81.7)	23.5 (74.3)	40.1 (104.2)
Mean daily maximum °C (°F)	8.6 (47.5)	10.2 (50.4)	13.9 (57.0)	19.3 (66.7)	24.2 (75.6)	27.1 (80.8)	31.6 (88.9)	31.3 (88.3)	27.6 (81.7)	23.0 (73.4)	17.8 (64.0)	11.5 (52.7)	20.5 (68.9)
Daily mean °C (°F)	4.8 (40.6)	6.2 (43.2)	9.8 (49.6)	14.9 (58.8)	20.0 (68.0)	23.7 (74.7)	28.0 (82.4)	27.9 (82.2)	24.2 (75.6)	19.1 (66.4)	13.6 (56.5)	7.3 (45.1)	16.6 (61.9)
Mean daily minimum °C (°F)	1.8 (35.2)	3.0 (37.4)	6.4 (43.5)	11.2 (52.2)	16.5 (61.7)	21.0 (69.8)	25.3 (77.5)	25.4 (77.7)	21.4 (70.5)	15.7 (60.3)	10.1 (50.2)	4.0 (39.2)	13.5 (56.3)
Record low °C (°F)	−7.9 (17.8)	−6.0 (21.2)	−4.2 (24.4)	−0.7 (30.7)	7.1 (44.8)	12.7 (54.9)	18.7 (65.7)	18.8 (65.8)	11.5 (52.7)	1.9 (35.4)	−1.7 (28.9)	−7.8 (18.0)	−7.9 (17.8)
Average precipitation mm (inches)	72.2 (2.84)	67.9 (2.67)	97.5 (3.84)	85.2 (3.35)	94.0 (3.70)	211.2 (8.31)	135.7 (5.34)	187.8 (7.39)	126.0 (4.96)	73.8 (2.91)	63.7 (2.51)	54.6 (2.15)	1,269.6 (49.97)
Average precipitation days (≥ 0.1 mm)	10.9	10.1	13.4	12.0	11.8	15.0	11.6	11.9	10.2	7.8	9.4	8.8	132.9
Average snowy days	1.8	1.5	0.5	0	0	0	0	0	0	0	0	0.8	4.6
Average relative humidity (%)	77	78	78	77	78	85	82	83	81	78	78	75	79
Mean monthly sunshine hours	112.4	117.0	140.7	164.3	172.6	123.8	207.4	202.1	170.4	164.3	131.9	130.1	1,837
Percentage possible sunshine	35	37	38	42	41	29	48	50	46	47	42	42	41
Source: China Meteorological Administration

== Government ==
Districts of the Direct-Controlled Municipality of Shanghai are administratively on the same level as prefecture-level cities. However, the government of Pudong has a status equivalent to that of a sub-provincial city, which is a half-level above a prefecture-level city. This is due to Pudong's size and importance as the financial hub of China. The Pudong Communist Party Secretary is the top office of the district, followed by the district governor of Pudong. The Pudong party chief is customarily also a member of the Shanghai Party Standing Committee.

On April 27, 2015, the People's Government of Pudong New Area is working with China (Shanghai) Pilot Free-Trade Zone Administrative Committee.

== Demographics ==
Pudong is bounded by the Huangpu River in the west and the East China Sea in the east. Pudong is distinguished from Puxi ("West Bank"), the older part of Shanghai. It has an area of 1,210.4 square kilometres (467.3 sq mi) and, according to the 2024 census, a population of 5.79 million inhabitants. Pudong's resident population growth is well above national average because it is a popular immigration destination. The 2020 census shows an 8% increase in the last decade, or an annual pace of 0.8%.

Excluding immigrants, the birth rate in 2010 was 0.806% while the death rate is 0.729, resulting a net growth of 0.077%. The total fertility rate is 1.03, well below the replacement level. The district actually has a negative registered household population growth if immigrants are excluded, thus the growth is purely driven by immigration.

The 2020 census shows a population density of 3,006/km^{2}. About 3/4 of the population live in the northern part and part of city center called "Northern Territory". 1/4 live in the "Southern Territory" that was the Nanhui District. The Northern Territory has a 6,667 population density, while the Southern Territory has 1,732/km^{2}. Suburbs saw a greater increase in population during 2000–2010 with the help of the city's suburb expansion policy. Some counties in the traditional city center saw a population decrease.

== Subdistricts and towns ==
Name	Chinese (S)	Hanyu Pinyin	Shanghainese Romanization	Population (2010)	Area (km^{2})
Weifang Xincun Subdistrict	潍坊新村街道	Wéifāng Xīncūn Jiēdào	vij vaon sin tsen ka do	100,548	3.89
Lujiazui Subdistrict	陆家嘴街道	Lùjiāzuǐ Jiēdào	loq ka tzyu ka do	112,507	6.89
Zhoujiadu Subdistrict	周家渡街道	Zhōujiādù Jiēdào	tzoe ka du ka do	144,668	5.52
Tangqiao Subdistrict	塘桥街道	Tángqiáo Jiēdào	daon djio ka do	76,916	3.86
Shanggang Xincun Subdistrict	上钢新村街道	Shànggāng Xīncūn Jiēdào	zaon kaon sin tsen ka do	104,932	7.54
Nanmatou Road Subdistrict	南码头路街道	Nánmǎtóulù Jiēdào	neu mau doe lu ka do	107,130	4.22
Hudong Xincun Subdistrict	沪东新村街道	Hùdōng Xīncūn Jiēdào	wu ton sin tsen ka do	112,031	5.51
Jinyang Xincun Subdistrict	金杨新村街道	Jīnyáng Xīncūn Jiēdào	cin yan sin tsen ka do	206,017	8.02
Yangjing Subdistrict	洋泾街道	Yángjīng Jiēdào	yan cin ka do	146,237	7.38
Puxing Road Subdistrict	浦兴路街道	Pǔxìnglù Jiēdào	phu xin lu ka do	177,468	6.25
Dongming Road Subdistrict	东明路街道	Dōngmínglù Jiēdào	ton min lu ka do	121,449	5.95
Huamu Subdistrict	花木街道	Huāmù Jiēdào	hau moq ka do	221,327	20.93
Chuanshaxin Town* (Chwansha)	川沙新镇	Chuānshāxīn Zhèn	tseu sa sau sin tzen	420,045	148.05
Gaoqiao town	高桥镇	Gāoqiáo Zhèn	ko djio tzen	184,486	38.73
Beicai town	北蔡镇	Běicài Zhèn	poq tsa tzen	276,547	24.91
Heqing town	合庆镇	Héqìng Zhèn	req chin tzen	132,038	41.97
Tang town	唐镇	Tángzhèn	daon tzen	129,267	32.16
Caolu town	曹路镇	Cáolù Zhèn	dzo lu tzen	186,012	45.58
Jinqiao town	金桥镇	Jīnqiáo Zhèn	cin djio tzen	81,537	25.28
Gaohang town	高行镇	Gāoháng Zhèn	ko raon tzen	137,625	22.85
Gaodong town	高东镇	Gāodōng Zhèn	ko ton tzen	110,552	36.24
Zhangjiang town	张江镇	Zhāngjiāng Zhèn	tzan kaon tzen	165,297	42.10
Sanlin town	三林镇	Sānlín Zhèn	se lin tzen	360,516	34.19
Huinan town	惠南镇	Huìnán Zhèn	we neu tzen	213,845	65.24
Zhoupu town	周浦镇	Zhōupǔ Zhèn	tzoe phu tzen	147,329	42.60
Xinchang town	新场镇	Xīnchǎng Zhèn	sin dzan tzen	84,183	54.30
Datuan Town	大团镇	Dàtuán Zhèn	da deu tzen	71,162	50.45
Kangqiao town	康桥镇	Kāngqiáo Zhèn	khaon djio tzen	174,672	41.25
Hangtou town	航头镇	Hángtóu Zhèn	raon doe tzen	110,060	60.40
Zhuqiao town	祝桥镇	Zhùqiáo Zhèn	tzoq djio tzen	104,945	146.28
Nicheng town	泥城镇	Níchéng Zhèn	gnij zen tzen	62,519	61.50
Xuanqiao town	宣桥镇	Xuānqiáo Zhèn	si djio tzen	59,567	45.78
Shuyuan town	书院镇	Shūyuàn Zhèn	syu yeu tzen	59,323	66.90
Wanxiang Town	万祥镇	Wànxiáng Zhèn	ve zian tzen	24,346	23.35
Laogang town	老港镇	Lǎogǎng Zhèn	lo kaon tzen	37,408	38.90
Nanhui Xincheng Town**	南汇新城镇	Nánhuì Xīnchéng Zhèn	neu we sin zen tzen	47,381	67.76
Luchaogang Farm	芦潮港农场	Lúcháogǎng Nóngchǎng	lu dzo kaon non dzan	688	9.40
Donghai Farm	东海农场	Dōnghǎi Nóngchǎng	ton he non dzan	508	15.20
Chaoyang Farm	朝阳农场	Cháoyáng Nóngchǎng	dzo yan non dzan	862	10.67
Waigaoqiao Free-trade Zone	外高桥保税区	Wàigāoqiáo Bǎoshuìqū	nga ko djio po seu chiu	1,349	10.00
Jinqiao Export Processing Zone	金桥经济技术开发区	Jīnqiáo Jīngjì Jìshù Kāifāqū	cin djio cin tzij djij dzeq khe faq chiu	5,514	67.79
Zhangjiang Hi-tech Park	张江高科技园区	Zhāngjiāng Gāo Kējì Yuánqū	tzan kaon ko khu djij yeu chiu	23,617	75.90

- * – Liuzao town merged into Chuanshaxin town.
- ** – Luchaogang town and Shengang Subdistrict merged and form Nanhui Xincheng town.

== Education ==
=== Universities and higher education ===
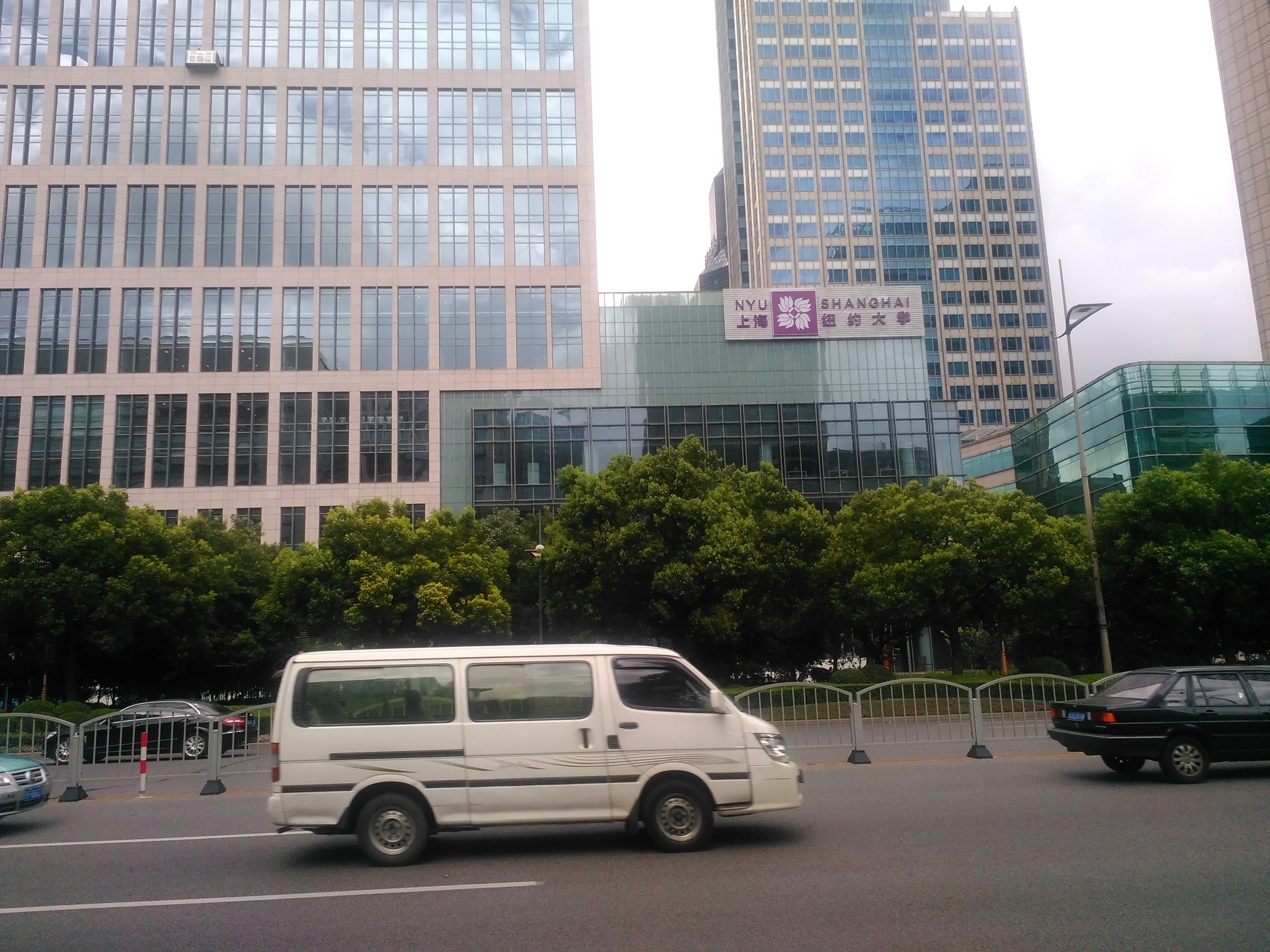
New York University Shanghai

- Shanghai Maritime University
- Shanghai Dianji University
- Shanghai Fisheries University
- China Executive Leadership Academy in Pudong
- Fudan University in Zhangjiang
- New York University Shanghai
- ShanghaiTech University

=== Primary and secondary schools ===
Public schools:

- No. 2 High School Attached to East China Normal University
- Jianping High School
- Dongchang High School of ECNU
- Pudong Foreign Languages School of Shanghai International Studies University
- Shanghai Jincai Experimental Junior Middle School

International schools:

- Dulwich College Shanghai
- French School of Shanghai Pudong Campus
- Nord Anglia International School Shanghai Pudong
- German School Shanghai Pudong Campus
- Shanghai American School Pudong Campus
- Shanghai Japanese School (SJS) Pudong Campus (elementary and junior high), and SJS Senior High School
- Wellington College International Shanghai
- Concordia International School Shanghai Pudong Campus

Other private schools:

- Shanghai Gold Apple Bilingual School
- Shanghai Shangde Experimental School
- Shanghai Pinghe School

== Economy ==
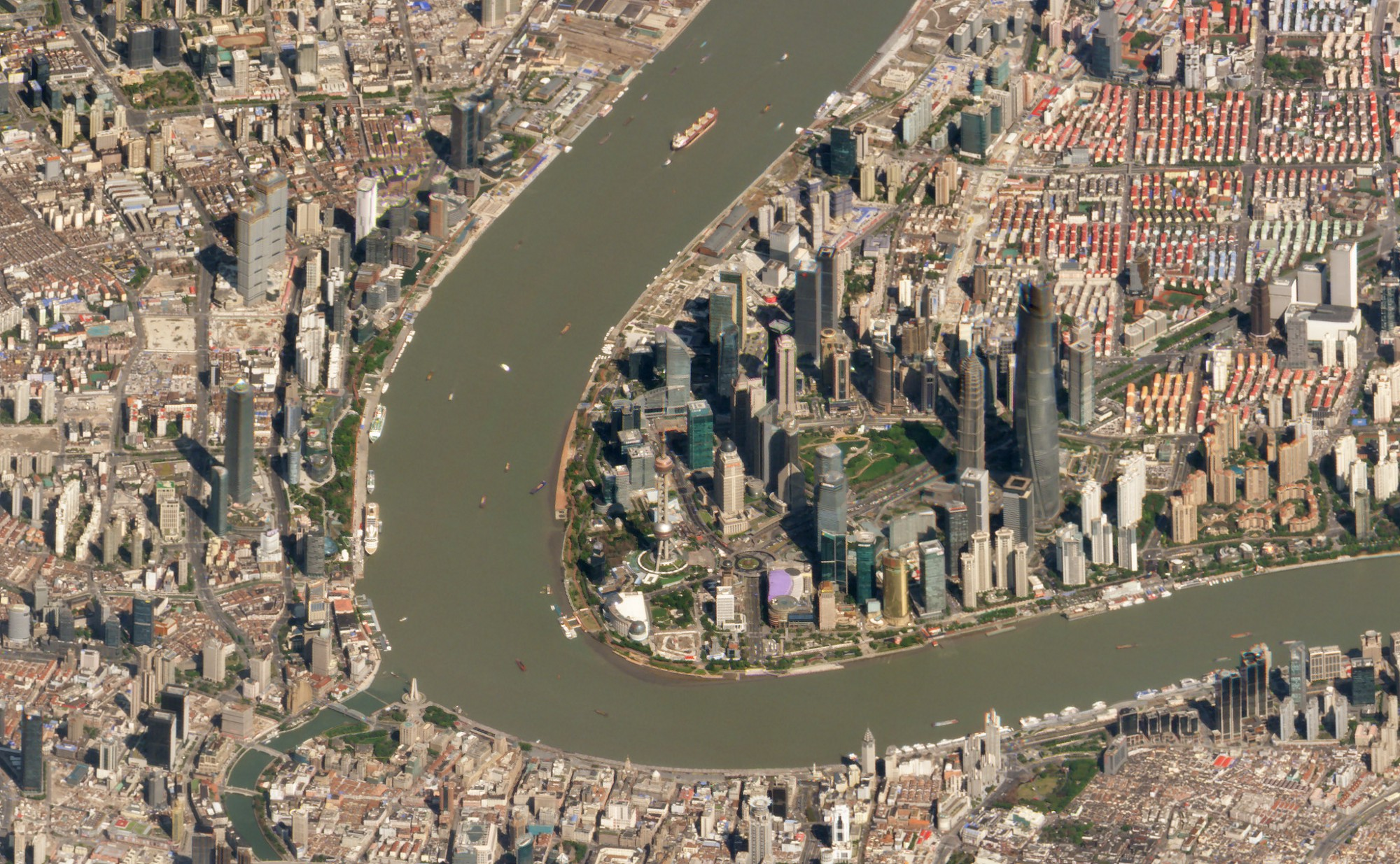
Pudong aerial view.

With the Nanhui District merger in May 2009, the size of Pudong's economy grew. The district's 2025 gross domestic product amounts to an estimated CN¥1.88 trillion (US$263 billion), corresponding to around 33% of Shanghai's economy. Its GDP per capita in 2022 was CN¥323,682, corresponding to around US$45,315 by nominal values.

The area is divided into four distinct economic districts. Apart from Lujiazui Trade and Finance Zone, there is Waigaoqiao Free Trade Zone, the largest free trade zone in mainland China covering approximately 10 square kilometres (3.9 sq mi) in north-east Pudong. The Jinqiao Export Processing Zone is another major industrial area in Pudong covering 19 square kilometres (7.3 sq mi). Zhangjiang Hi-Tech Park is a special area for technology-oriented businesses.

The Pudong area continues to experience rapid development, especially in the commercial sector, with 1.3 million square meters of prime office space reaching completion in 2008, more than the previous two years combined. Pudong has also attracted considerable fixed asset and real estate investment, reporting 87.268 billion RMB in fixed asset investment and 27.997 billion RMB in real estate investment in 2008.

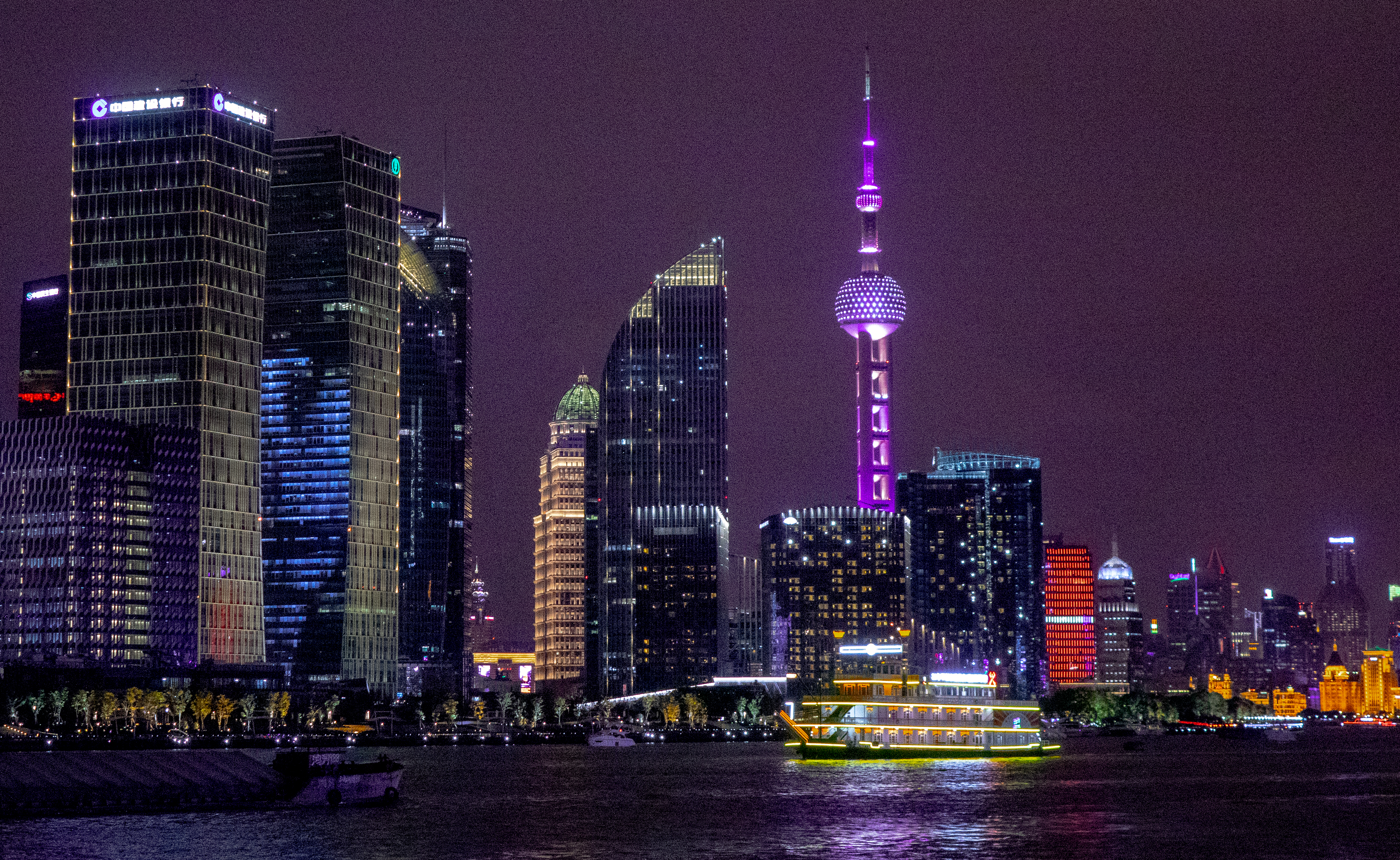
Pudong area of Shanghai, at night

The newest Disney resort, with a Disneyland included, is located in Pudong, which opened to tourists in June 2016.

=== Businesses ===
Bao Steel has its head office in the Bao Steel Tower (simplified Chinese: 宝钢大厦; traditional Chinese: 寶鋼大廈; pinyin: Bǎogāng Dàshà) in Pudong. Comac has its head office in Pudong. The headquarters of Yangtze River Express, a cargo airline, are in the Pufa Tower (浦发大厦; 浦发大廈; Pǔfā Dàshà) in Pudong. Juneyao Air has its headquarters in the district.

Hang Seng Bank has its mainland offices in the Hang Seng Bank Tower in Pudong. Kroll has an office in the Hang Seng Bank Tower. Google has its Shanghai offices in the Shanghai World Financial Center.

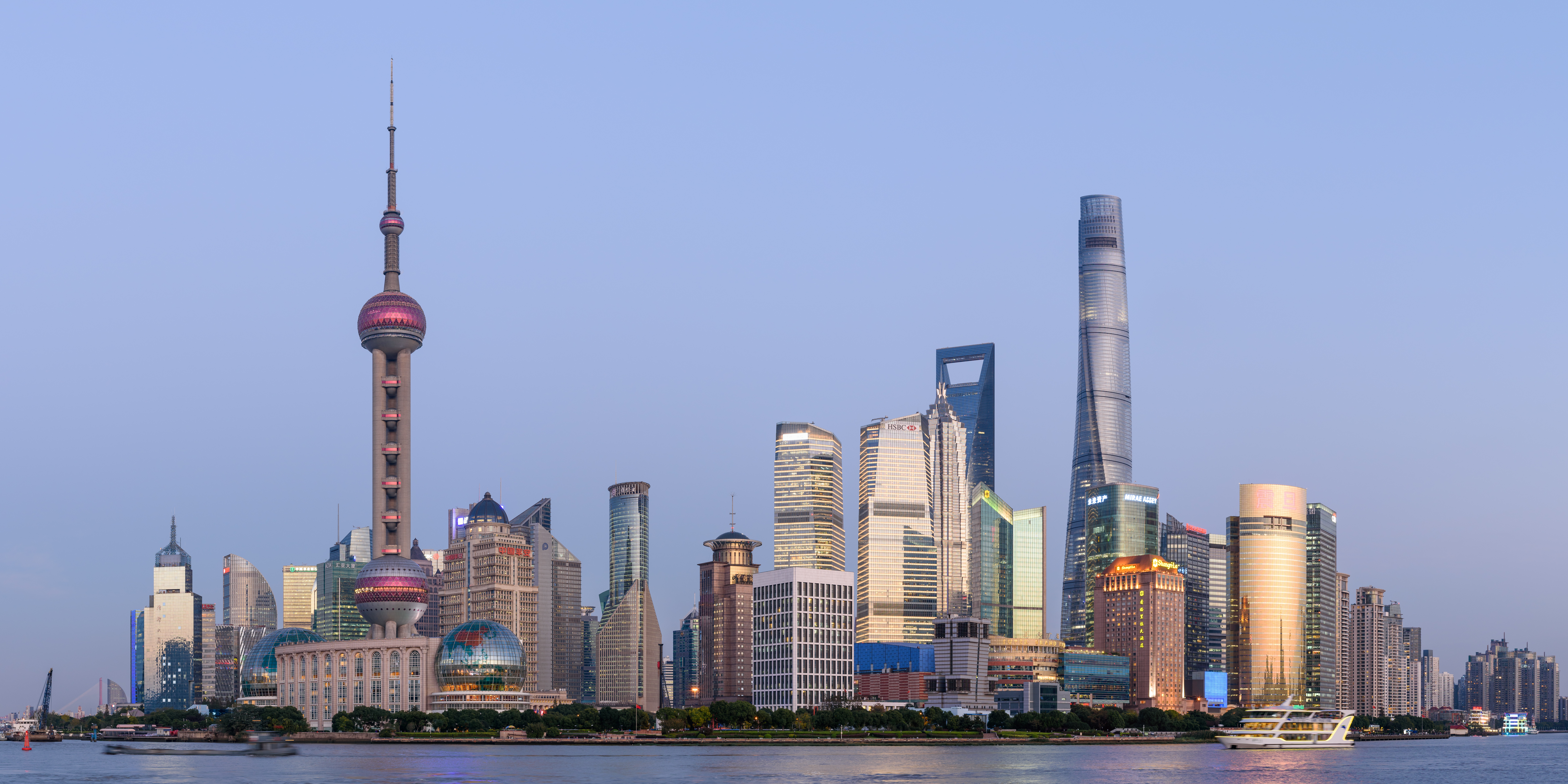
Skyscrapers in Pudong

One unusual commercial development in Pudong is the Shanghai Pentagonal Mart, a Pentagon-shaped shopping complex completed in 2009 that was later reported as one of Shanghai's largest vacant buildings.

== Transportation ==
The Shanghai Pudong International Airport started its construction in October 1997 and officially opened on September 16, 1999. By 2025, Pudong airport has become the busiest airport in China and 5th busiest airport worldwide by passenger traffic and 2nd busiest airport worldwide by cargo traffic.

In the same year, Line 2 of the Shanghai Metro commenced services. An extension brought the line further east, where it serves the airport. Other lines, namely Lines 4, 6, 7, 8, 9, 10, 11, 12, 13, 14, 16, and 18 also have sections that serve parts of Pudong. A magnetic levitation train began operating in 2004, moving passengers between the airport and Longyang Road Metro station.

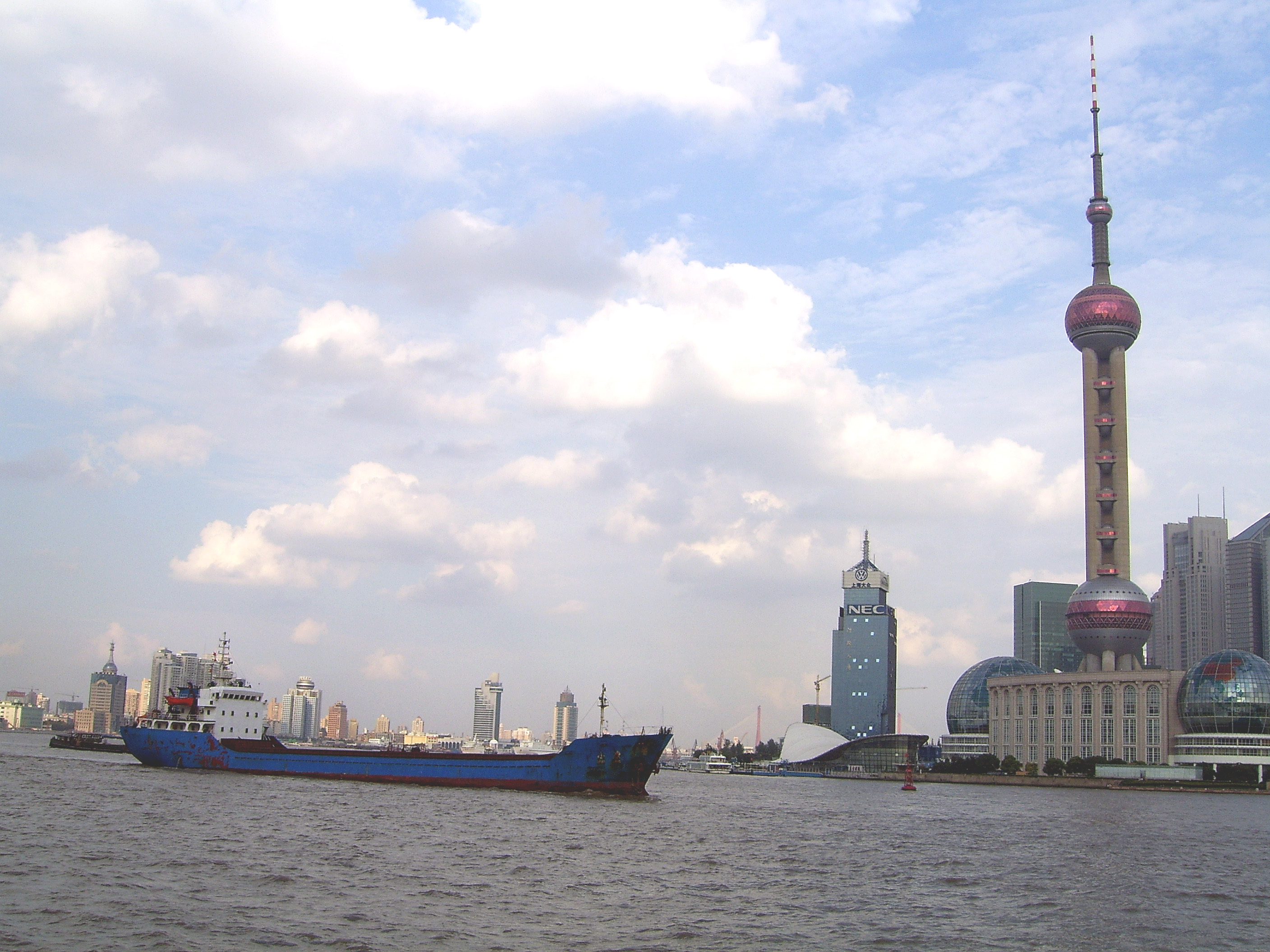
Ships on the Huangpu River with Pudong in view

Pudong is connected to downtown Puxi by fourteen tunnels (out of eighteen cross-Huangpu tunnels in total) and four major bridges (out of eleven in total). The first of these bridges were the Nanpu Bridge (1991) and the Yangpu Bridge (1993). The Xupu Bridge opened in 1996. The latest of these is Lupu Bridge, which is the world's second longest arch bridge and was completed in 2002. Currently, there are fourteen tunnels that link Pudong and downtown Puxi. Dapu Rd. Tunnel is the first tunnel across the Huangpu River, followed by Yan'an Rd. Tunnel (running east–west), Waihuan Tunnel (one part of the Shanghai Outer Ring Expressway), Dalian Rd. Tunnel (running north–south), and Fuxing Rd. Tunnel (complementing the Yan'an Rd. Tunnel). Many new tunnels have been constructed since then, especially around the Lujiazui area.

Roads in Pudong have no particular longitudinal or latitudinal orientation. Major thoroughfares Pudong Avenue, Zhangyang Road and Yanggao Road run east–west until Yangpu Bridge before turning gradually to become north–south. Century Avenue crosses all three major roads and extends from Lujiazui to Century Park. Yanggao Road extends south to the S20 Shanghai Outer Ring Expressway, which runs east–west from Xupu Bridge and then north–south beginning at the interchange near Renxi Village, when the east–west expressway turns into Yingbin Avenue, headed for Pudong International Airport.

=== Metro ===
Pudong is currently served by thirteen metro lines operated by Shanghai Metro and one maglev line operated by Shanghai Maglev Train, in addition to the Airport Link Line:

- Line 2 - Lujiazui 14 , Dongchang Road, Century Avenue 4 6 9 , Shanghai Science and Technology Museum, Century Park, Longyang Road 7 16 18 Maglev , Zhangjiang Hi-Tech Park, Jinke Road, Guanglan Road, Tangzhen, Middle Chuangxin Road, East Huaxia Road, Chuansha, Lingkong Road, Yuandong Avenue, Haitiansan Road, Pudong International Airport Maglev
- Line 4 - Pudong Avenue 14 , Century Avenue 2 6 9 , Pudian Road (4), Lancun Road 6 , Tangqiao
- Line 6 - Gangcheng Road 10 , North Waigaoqiao Free Trade Zone, Hangjin Road, South Waigaoqiao Free Trade Zone, Zhouhai Road, Wuzhou Avenue, Dongjing Road, Jufeng Road 12 , Wulian Road, Boxing Road, Jinqiao Road, Yunshan Road 14 , Deping Road, Beiyangjing Road, Minsheng Road 18 , Yuanshen Stadium, Century Avenue 2 4 9 , Pudian Road (6)), Lancun Road 4 , Shanghai Children's Medical Center, Linyi Xincun, West Gaoke Road 7 , Dongming Road 13 , Gaoqing Road, West Huaxia Road, Shangnan Road, South Lingyan Road, Oriental Sports Center 8 11
- Line 7 - Houtan, Changqing Road 13 , Yaohua Road 8 , Yuntai Road, West Gaoke Road 6 , South Yanggao Road, Jinxiu Road, Fanghua Road, Longyang Road 2 16 18 Maglev , Huamu Road
- Line 8 - China Art Museum, Yaohua Road 7 , Chengshan Road 13 , Yangsi, Oriental Sports Center 6 11 , Lingzhao Xincun Station
- Line 9 - Shangcheng Road, Century Avenue 2 4 6 , Middle Yanggao Road 18 , Fangdian Road, Lantian Road 14 , Taierzhuang Road, Jinqiao, Jinji Road, Jinhai Road 12 , Gutang Road, Minlei Road, Caolu
- Line 10 - Shuangjiang Road, West Gaoqiao, Gaoqiao, Gangcheng Road 6 , Jilong Road
- Line 11 - Disney Resort, Kangxin Highway, Xiuyan Road, Luoshan Road 16 , Yuqiao 18 , Pusan Road, East Sanlin, Sanlin, Oriental Sports Center 6 8
- Line 12 - Donglu Road, Jufeng Road 6 , North Yanggao Road, Jinjing Road, Shenjiang Road, Jinhai Road
- Line 13 - Shibo Avenue, Changqing Road 7 , Chengshan Road 8 , Dongming Road 6 , Huapeng Road, Xianan Road, Beicai, Chenchun Road, Lianxi Road 18 , Middle Huaxia Road 16 , Zhongke Road, Xuelin Road, Zhangjiang Road
- Line 14 - Lujiazui 2 , South Pudong Road, Pudong Avenue 4 , Yuanshen Road, Changyi Road 18 , Xiepu Road, Longju Road, Yunshan Road 6 , Lantian Road 9 , Huangyang Road, Yunshun Road, Pudong Football Stadium, Jinyue Road, Guiqiao Road 9
- Line 16 - Longyang Road 2 7 18 Maglev , Middle Huaxia Road 13 , Luoshan Road 11 , East Zhoupu, Heshahangcheng, East Hangtou, Xinchang, Wild Animal Park, Huinan, East Huinan, Shuyuan, Lingang Avenue, Dishui Lake
- Line 18 - Changyi Road 14 , Minsheng Road 6 , Middle Yanggao Road 9 , Yingchun Road, Longyang Road 2 7 16 Maglev , Fangxin Road, Beizhong Road, Lianxi Road 13 , Yuqiao 11 , Kangqiao, Zhoupu, Fanrong Road, Shenmei Road, Hetao Road, Xiasha, Hangtou
- Shanghai maglev train - Longyang Road 2 7 16 18 , Pudong International Airport 2

== Gallery ==
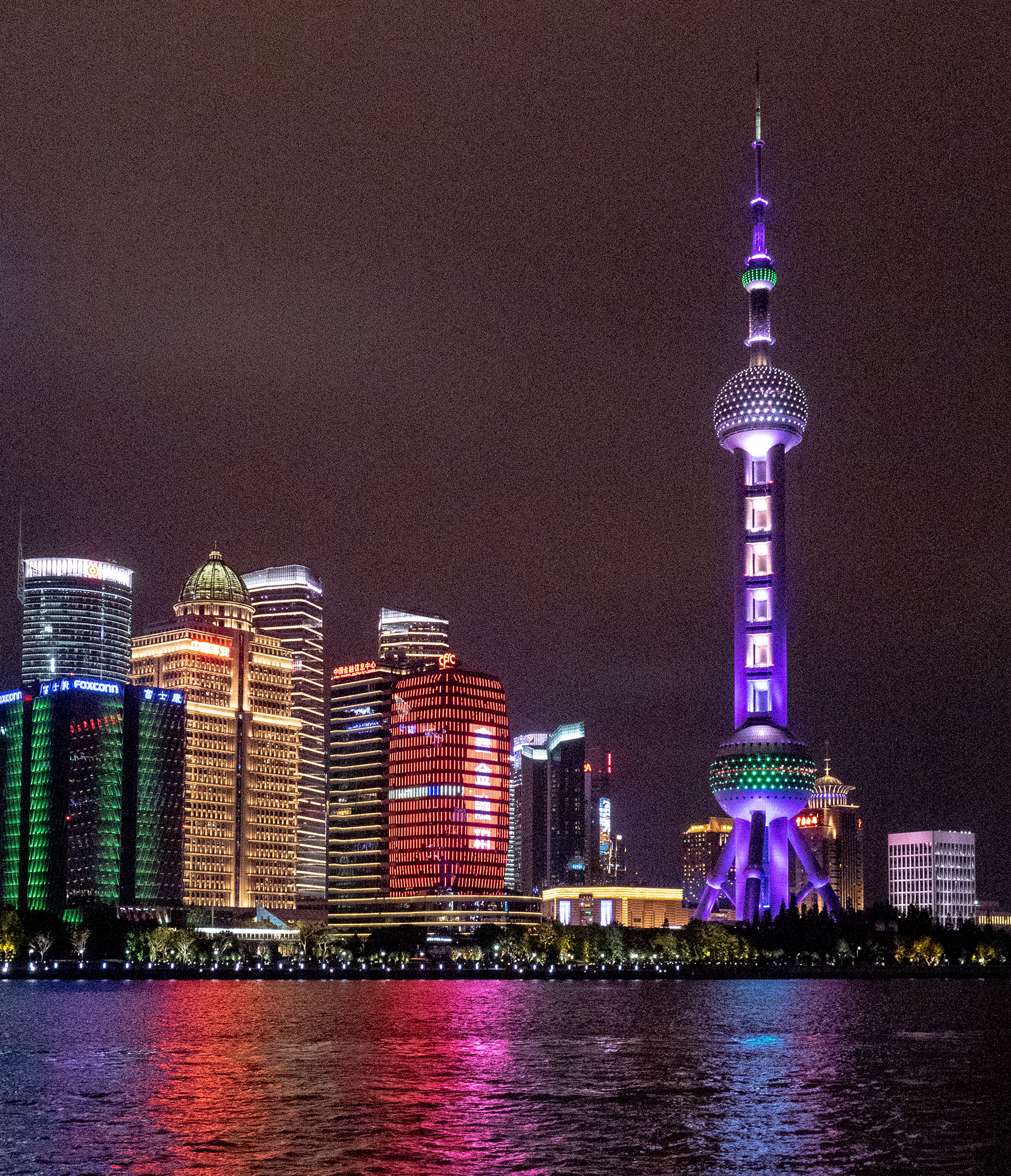
The Oriental Pearl tower at night

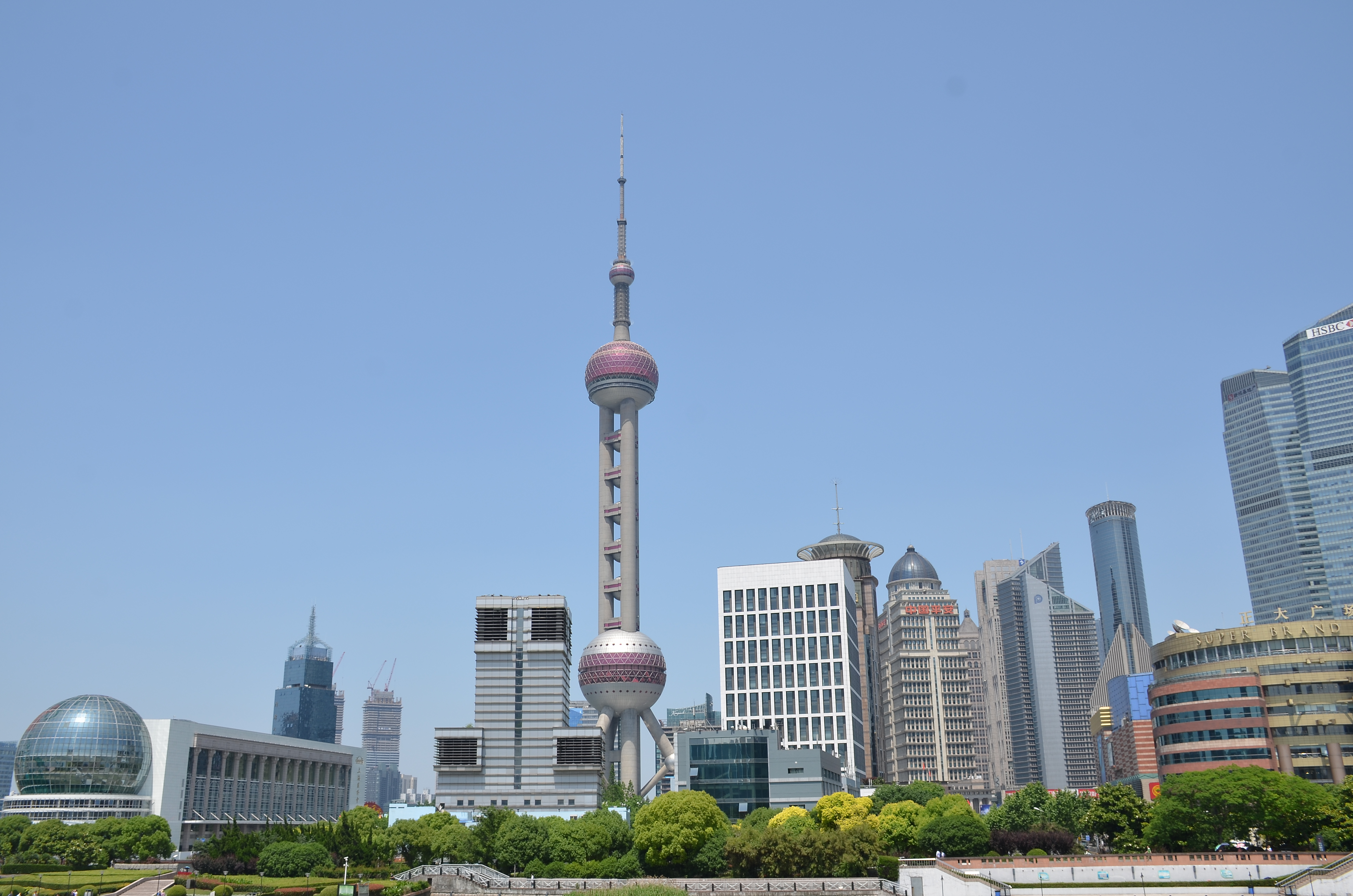
Lujiazui

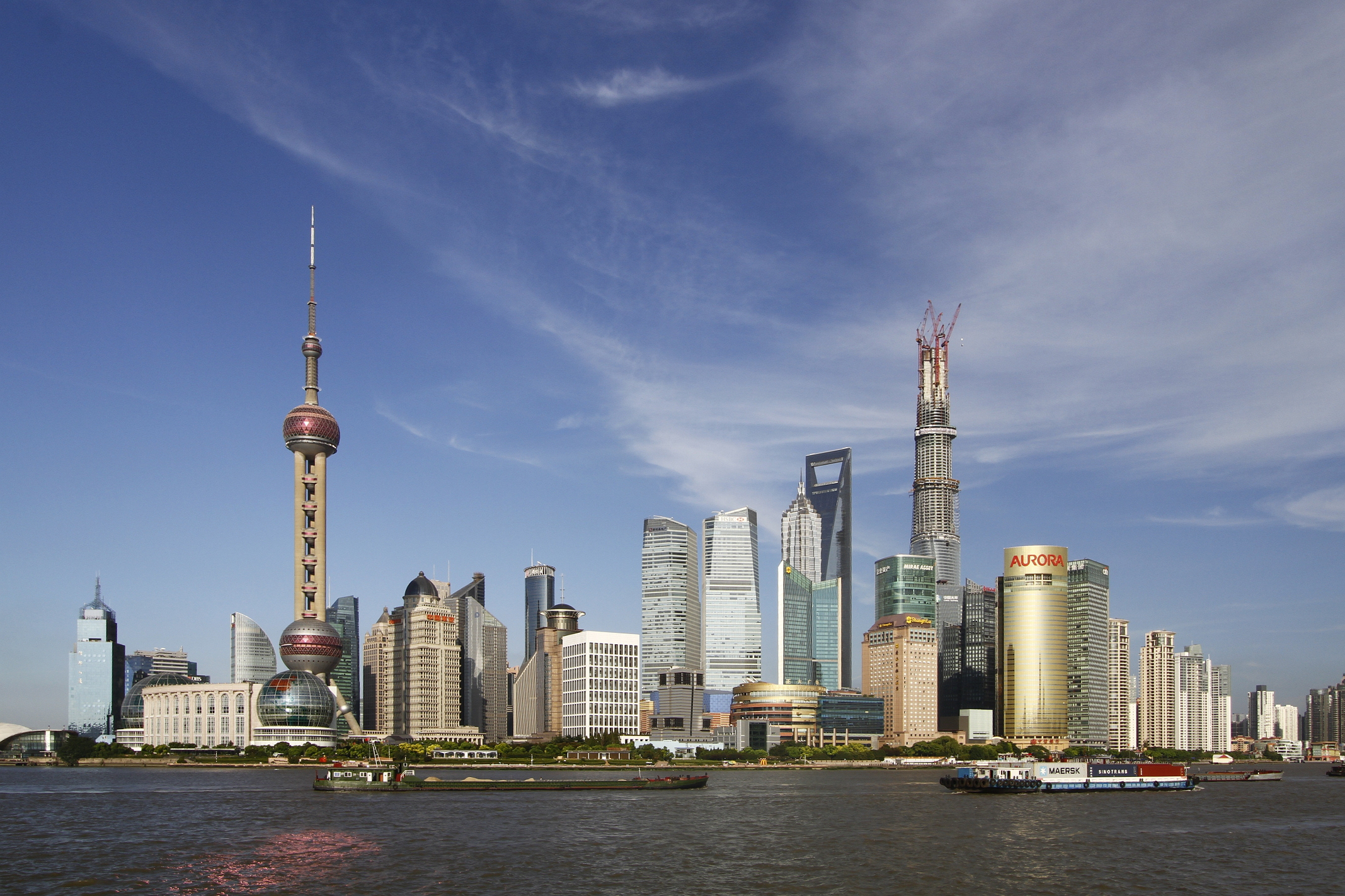
Pudong from the Bund

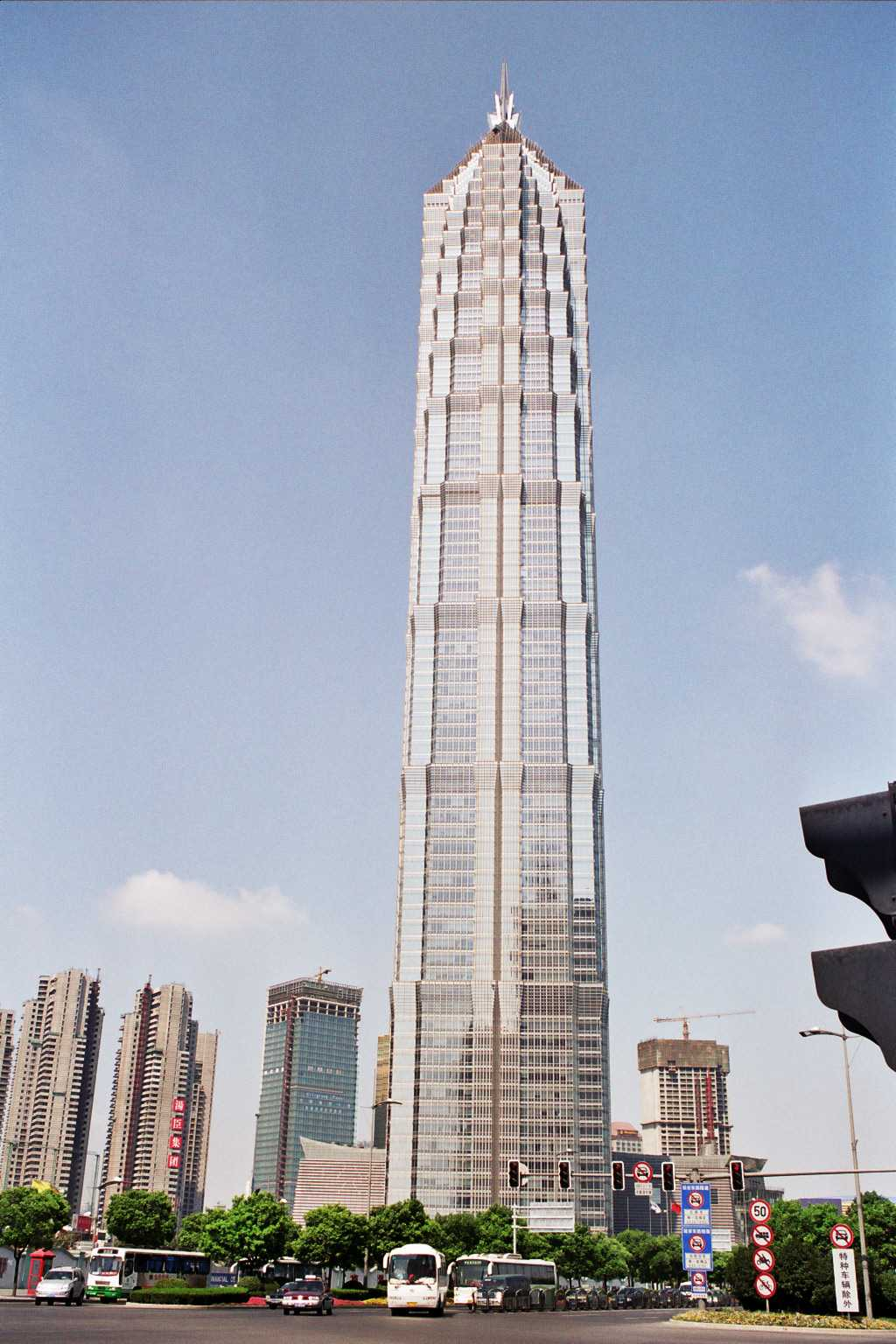
Jin Mao building

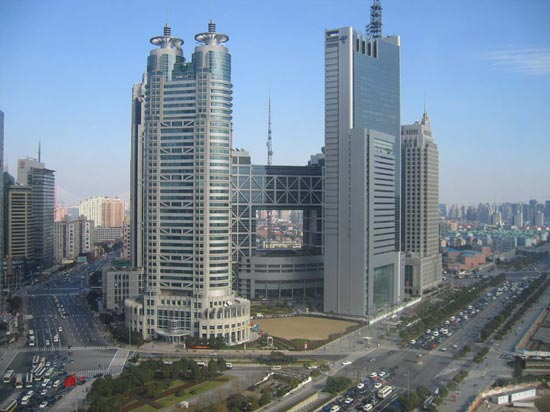
Lujiazui Finance and Trade Zone, Pudong

Lujiazui skyline, Pudong

CITIC Pacific HQ & Mandarin Oriental

Pudong at night (video)

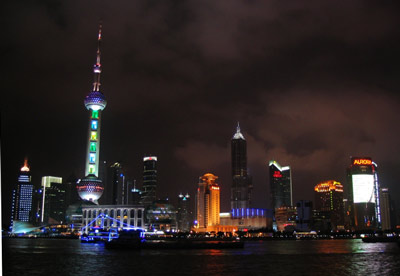
Pudong at night with Oriental Pearl Tower

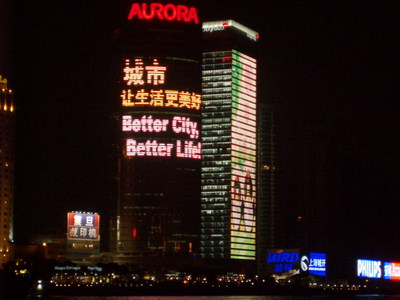
Huangpu River at night. "Better City, Better Life" is the theme of Expo 2010.

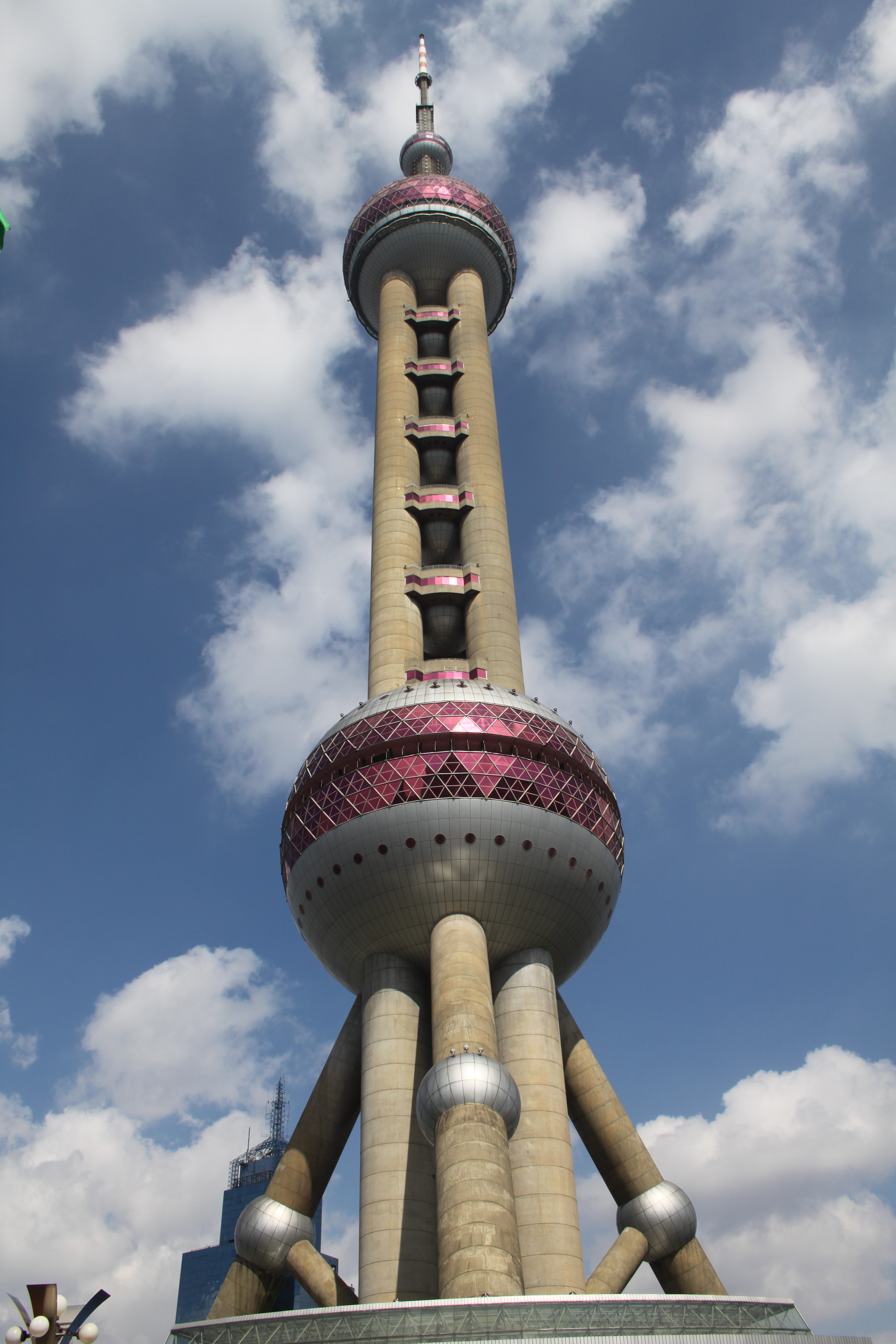
Shanghai Oriental Pearl Tower

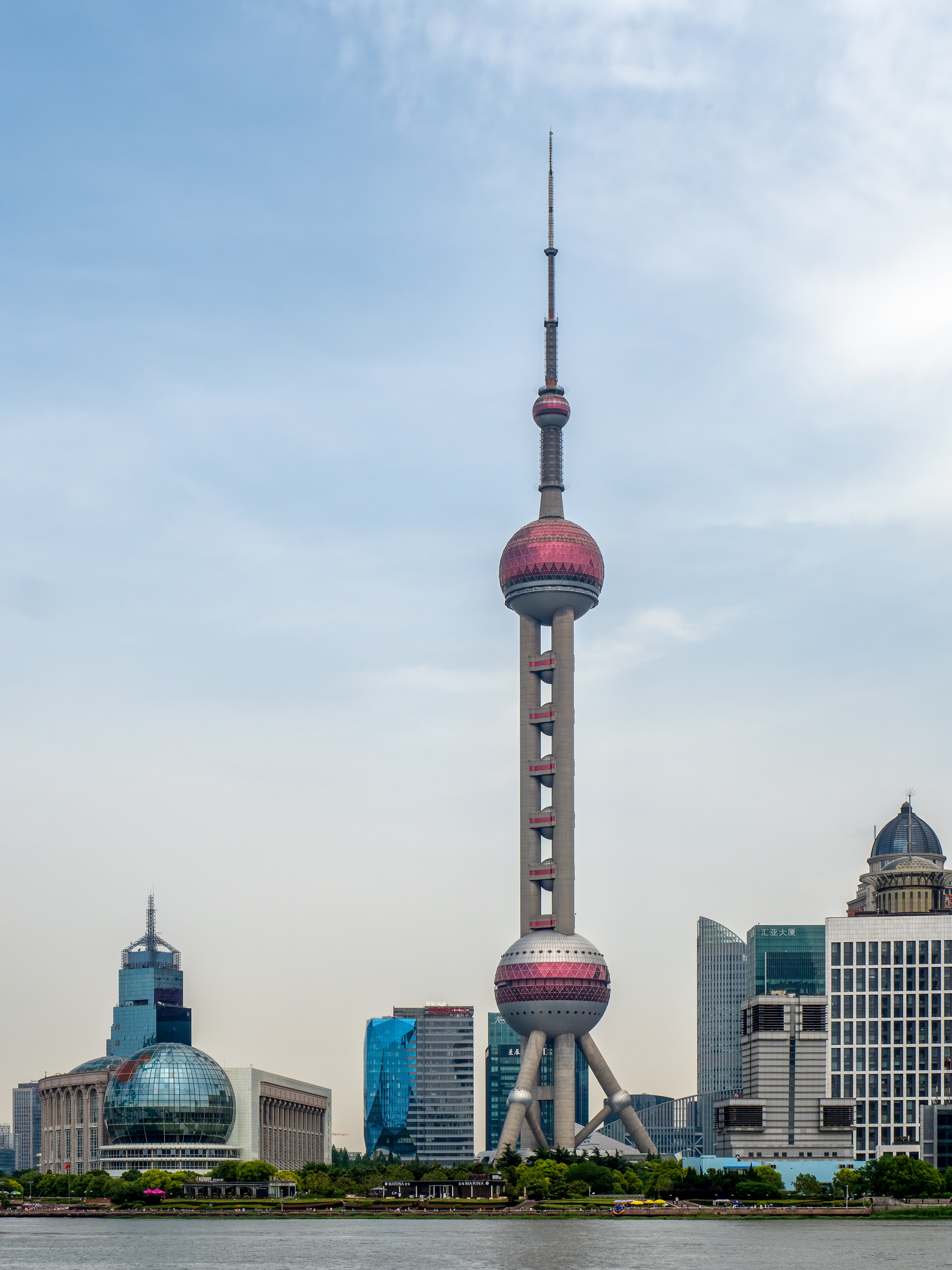
View of the Oriental Pearl Tower

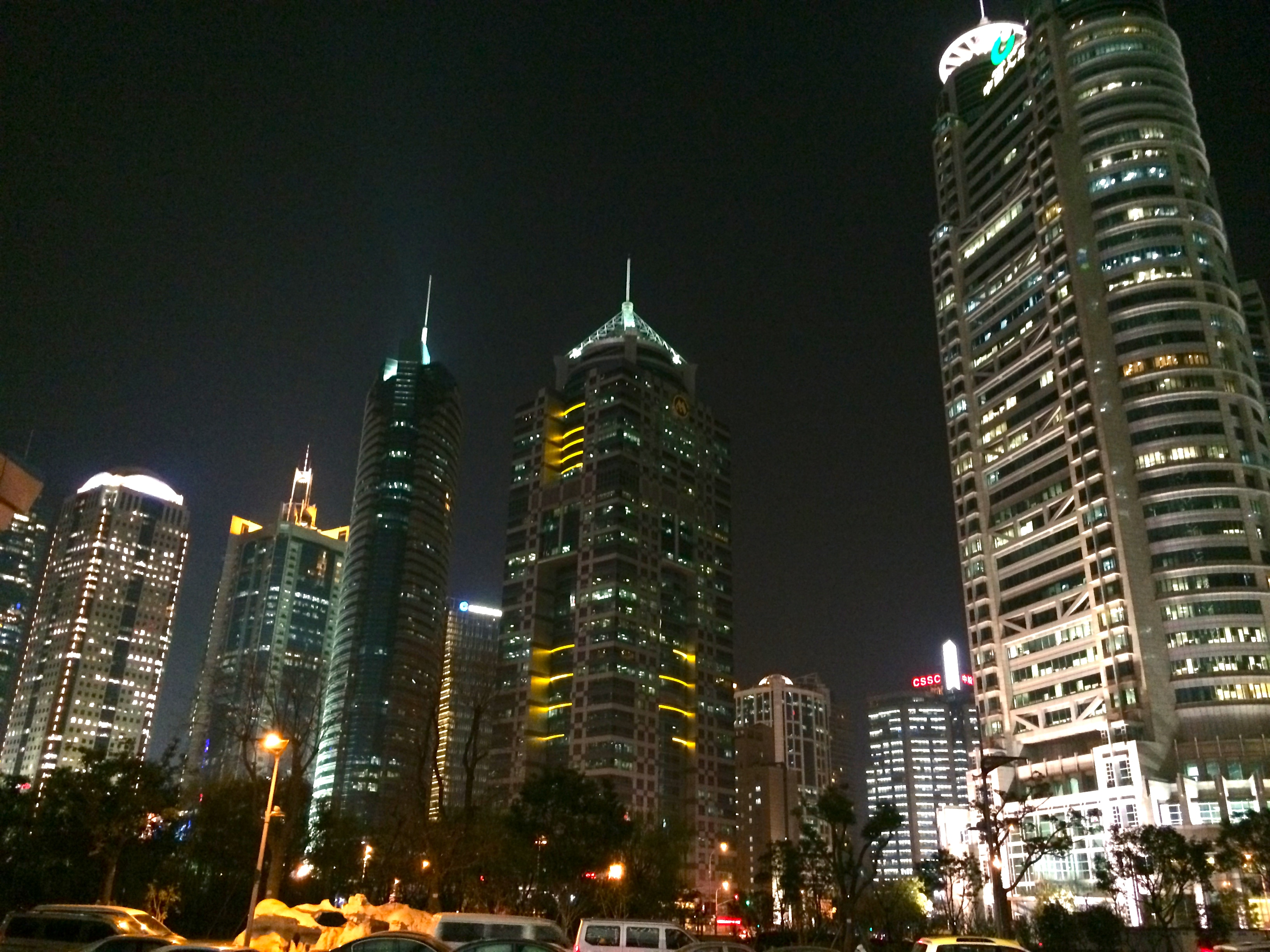
Lujiazui at night

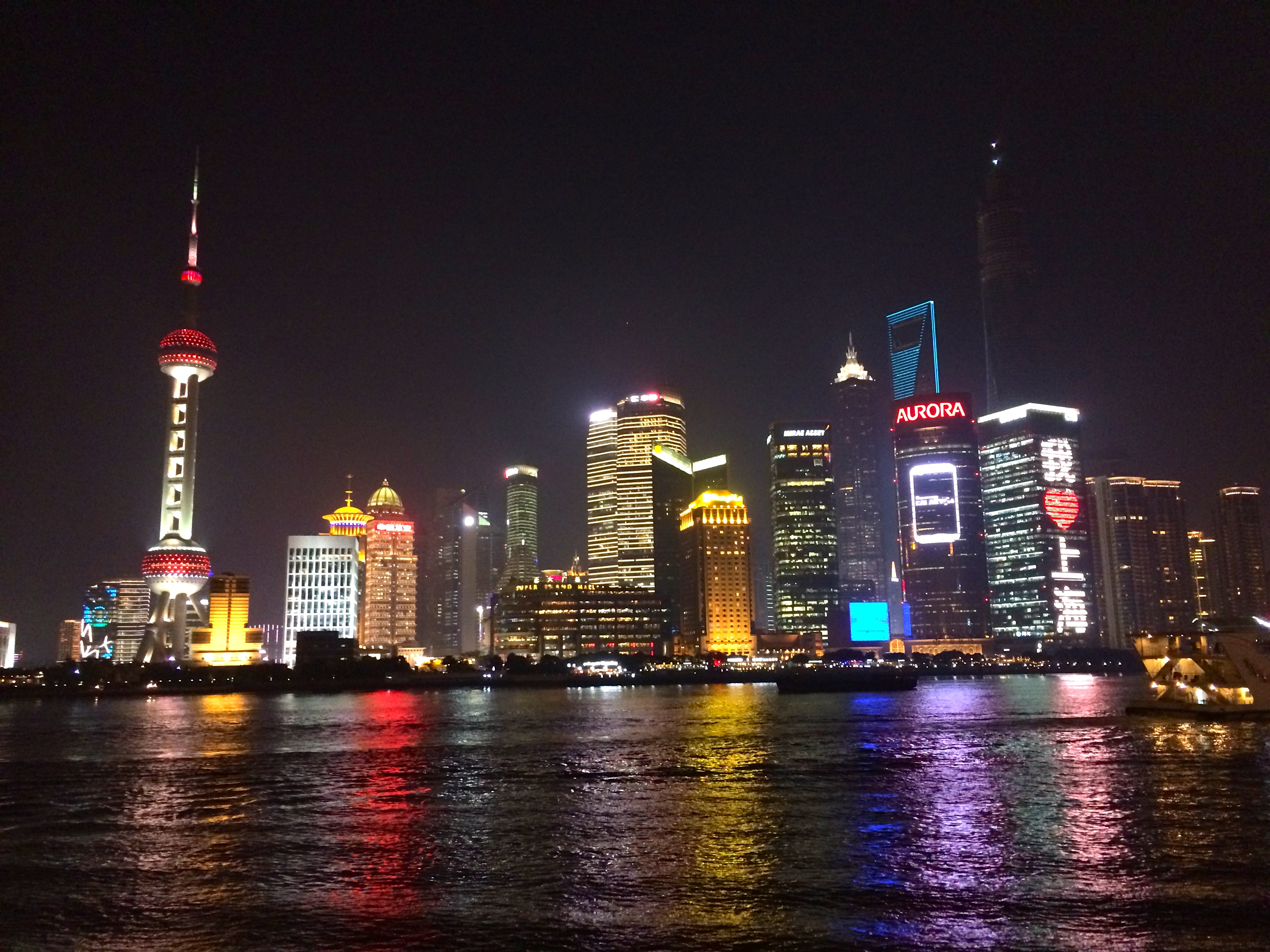
Lujiazui at night

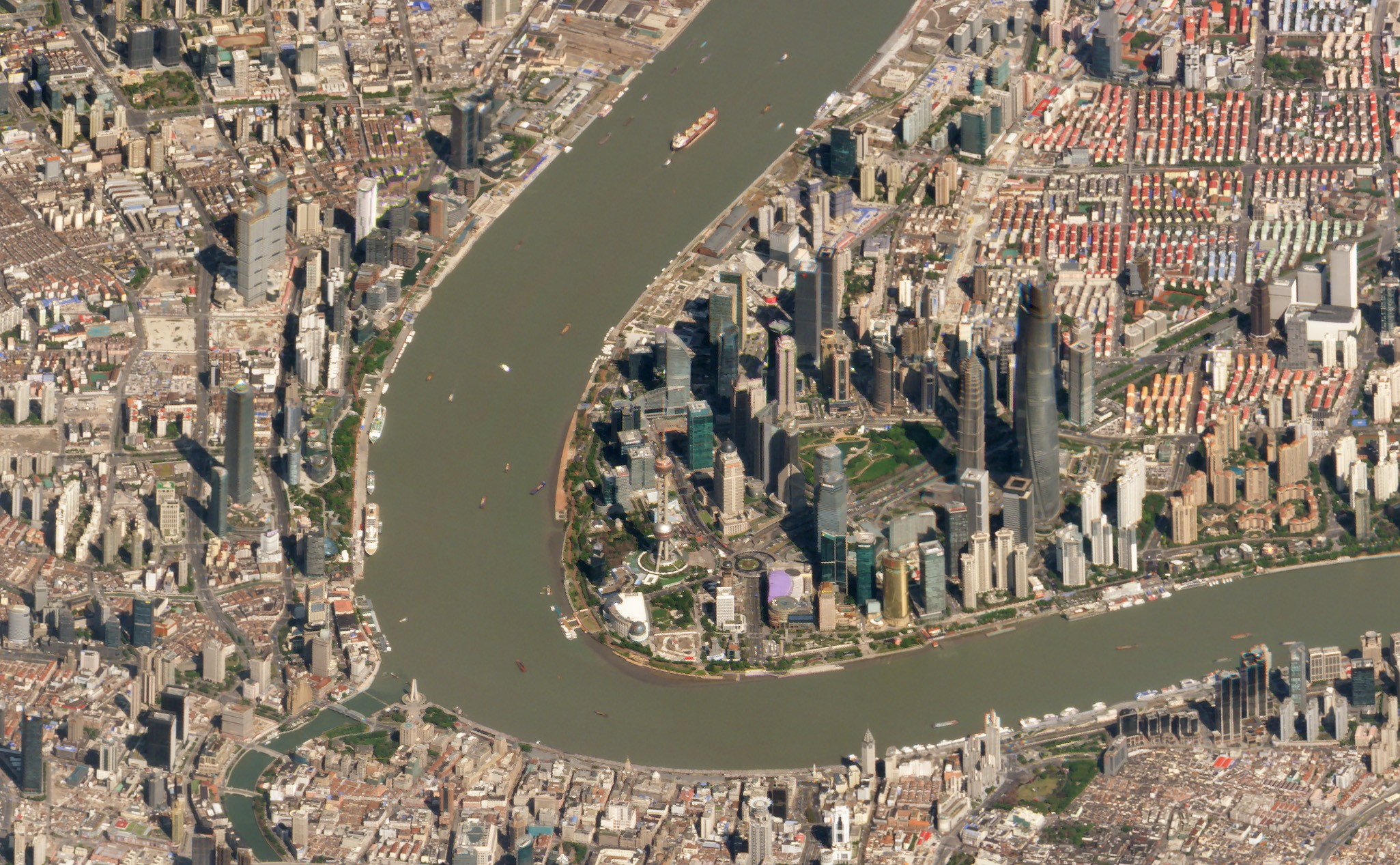
Satellite image of Shanghai's Pudong district.

== Twin towns – sister cities ==
Pudong is twinned with:

- Beverly Hills, California
- Kuopio

== See also ==
- Shanghai Premier League, amateur football (soccer) league based in Pudong
- Chinese cutter Pudong, Chinese Coast Guard cutter formerly named for the district
