= Shanghai Jianping High School =

Public school in Shanghai, China

- 上海市建平中学

Location
- 517 Gushan Rd, Pudong; Shanghai; China

Information
- Type: Public School
- Established: 1944
- Principal: Zhao Guodi (赵国弟)
- Staff: 149
- Gender: Co-ed
- Age: 15 to 18
- Website: www.jianping.com.cn

Shanghai Jianping High School
- Simplified Chinese: 上海市建平中学
- Traditional Chinese: 上海市建平中學
- Literal meaning: Shanghai City Jianping Secondary School
Transcriptions
Standard Mandarin
- Hanyu Pinyin: Shànghǎishì Jiànpíng Zhōngxué

Shanghai Jianping High School (上海市建平中学) is a public secondary school in Pudong, Shanghai, China. Founded in 1944, the school was recognized as Famous Trademarks in Shanghai.
