= Yunshun Road station =

Metro station in Shanghai, China

Yunshun Road 云顺路
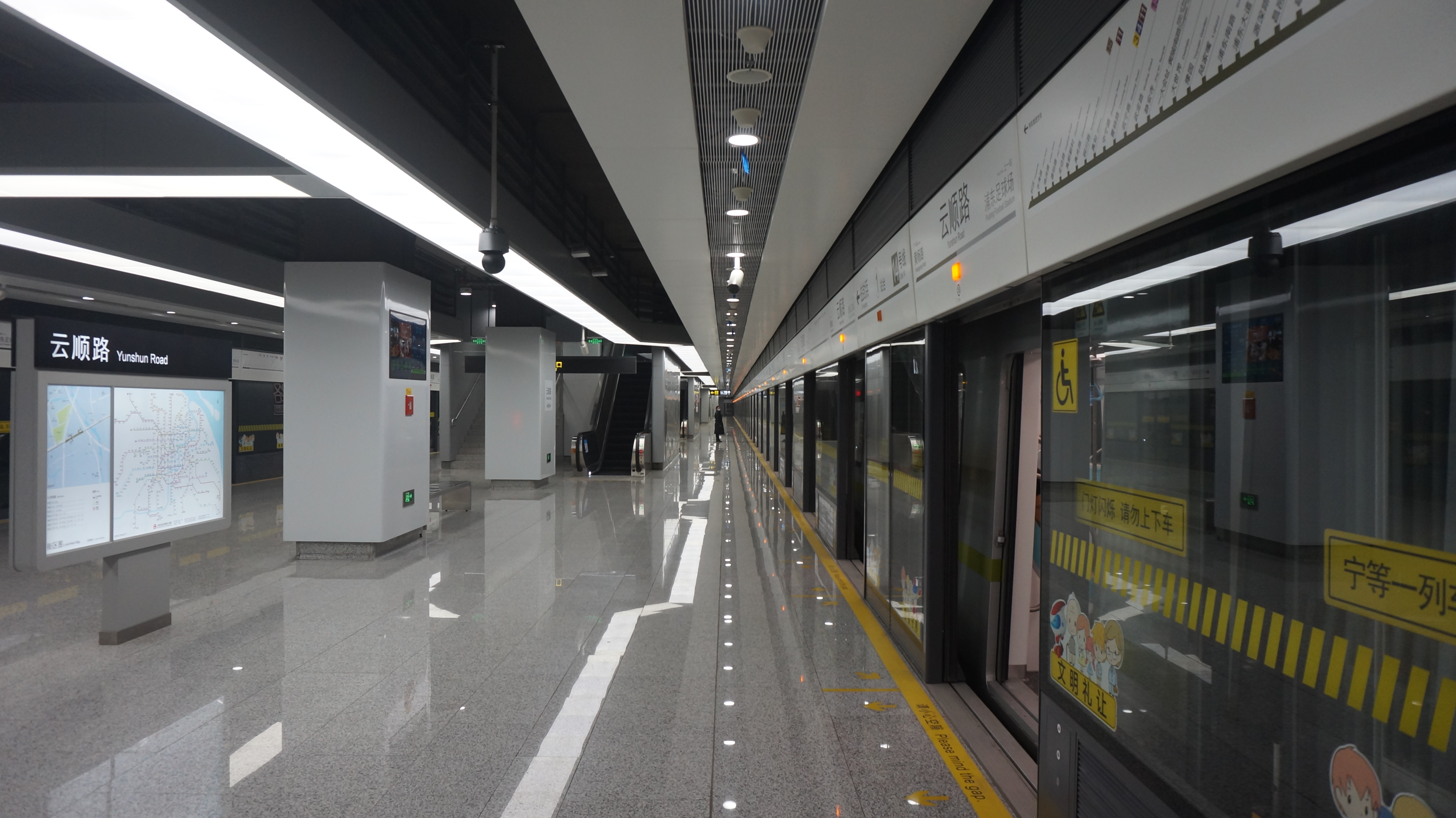
- Station platform

General information
- Location: Jinke Road and East Jinxiu Road, Pudong, Shanghai; China
- Coordinates: 31.238939°N 121.595389°E
- Line: Line 14
- Platforms: 2 (1 island platform)
- Tracks: 2

Construction
- Structure type: Underground
- Accessible: Yes

History
- Opened: 30 December 2021
- Previous names: East Jinxiu Road

Services
Preceding station	Shanghai Metro	Following station
Huangyang Road towards Fengbang	Line 14	Pudong Football Stadium towards Guiqiao Road
Location

Yunshun Road (simplified Chinese: 云顺路; traditional Chinese: 雲順路; pinyin: Yúnshùn Lù), formerly known as East Jinxiu Road (simplified Chinese: 锦绣东路; traditional Chinese: 錦繡東路; pinyin: Jǐnxiù Dōnglù), is a station that is part of Line 14 of the Shanghai Metro. Located at the intersection of Jinke Road and East Jinxiu Road in Pudong, the station opened with the rest of Line 14 on December 30, 2021. The station has currently 3 exits. It is near the bus station named East Jinxiu Road at Yunshun Road.
