= Lantian Road station =

Shanghai Metro station

Lantian Road 蓝天路
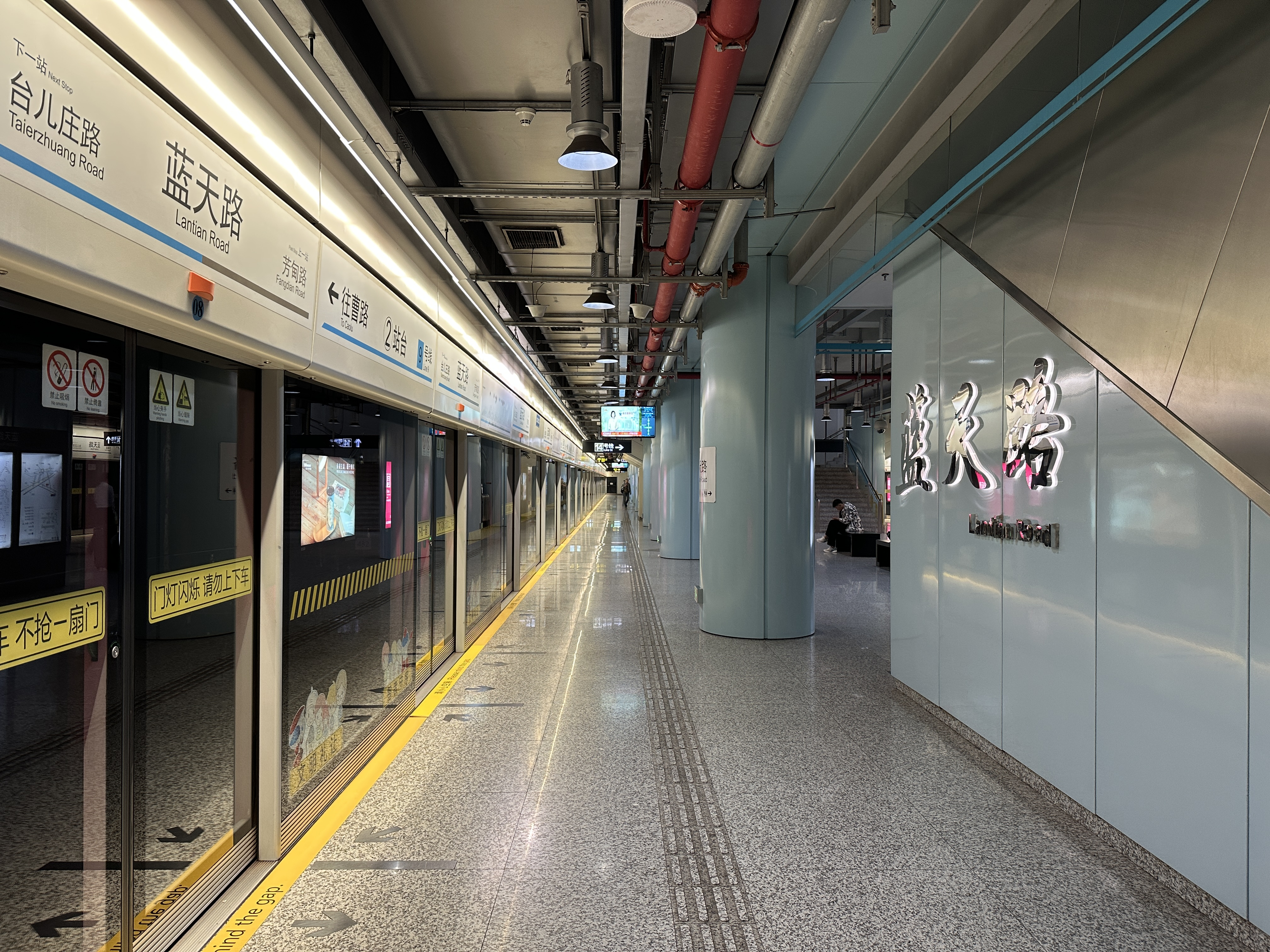
- Platform of Line 9

General information
- Location: Yunshan Road (云山路) and Middle Yanggao Road; Pudong New Area, Shanghai; China
- Coordinates: 31.243201°N 121.573755°E
- Operator: Shanghai No. 1 Metro Operation Co. Ltd.
- Lines: Line 9; Line 14
- Platforms: 4 (2 island platforms)
- Tracks: 4

Construction
- Structure type: Underground
- Accessible: Yes

History
- Opened: 30 December 2017 (Line 9); 30 December 2021 (Line 14)

Services
Preceding station	Shanghai Metro	Following station
Fangdian Road towards Shanghai Songjiang Railway Station	Line 9	Taierzhuang Road towards Caolu
Yunshan Road towards Fengbang	Line 14	Huangyang Road towards Guiqiao Road
Location
- Location within Shanghai

Lantian Road (simplified Chinese: 蓝天路; traditional Chinese: 藍天路; pinyin: Lántiān Lù) is a station on Line 9 and Line 14 of the Shanghai Metro. The station is located on Middle Yanggao Road at Yunshan Road, between Fangdian Road and Taierzhuang Road in Pudong. It is named after Lantian Road, which intersects with Yunshan Road one block south of the station. It began passenger trial operation with the rest of phase 3 of Line 9, an easterly extension with 9 new stations, on 30 December 2017. It became an interchange station as it also serves Line 14, which opened on 30 December 2021.

== Station layout ==
1F	Ground level	Exits
B1	Concourse	Tickets, Service Center
B2	Platform 3	← Line 14 towards Fengbang (Yunshan Road)
B2	Island platform, doors open on the left
B2	Platform 4	Line 14 towards Guiqiao Road (Huangyang Road) →
B3	Platform 1	← Line 9 towards Shanghai Songjiang Railway Station (Fangdian Road)
B3	Island platform, doors open on the left
B3	Platform 2	Line 9 towards Caolu (Taierzhuang Road) →

=== Entrances/exits ===
- 1: Yanggao Road (M), Yunshan Road, Yinshan Road
- 2: Yanggao Road (M), Yunshan Road
- 4: Lantian Road, Yushan Road
- 5: Yanggao Road (M), Yunshan Road
- 6: Yanggao Road (M), Yunshan Road, Jujiaqiao Road

== Gallery ==
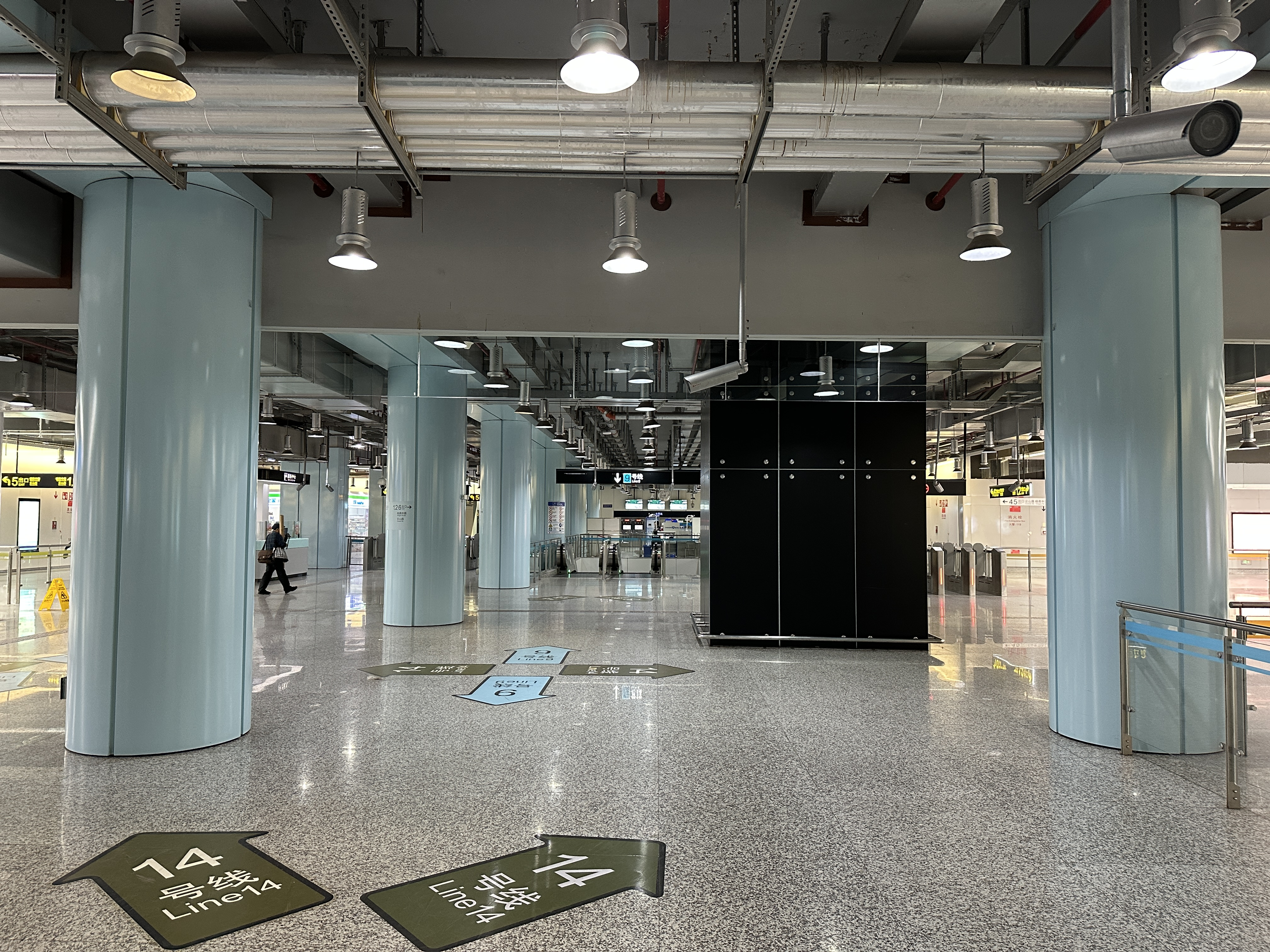
Line 9 concourse

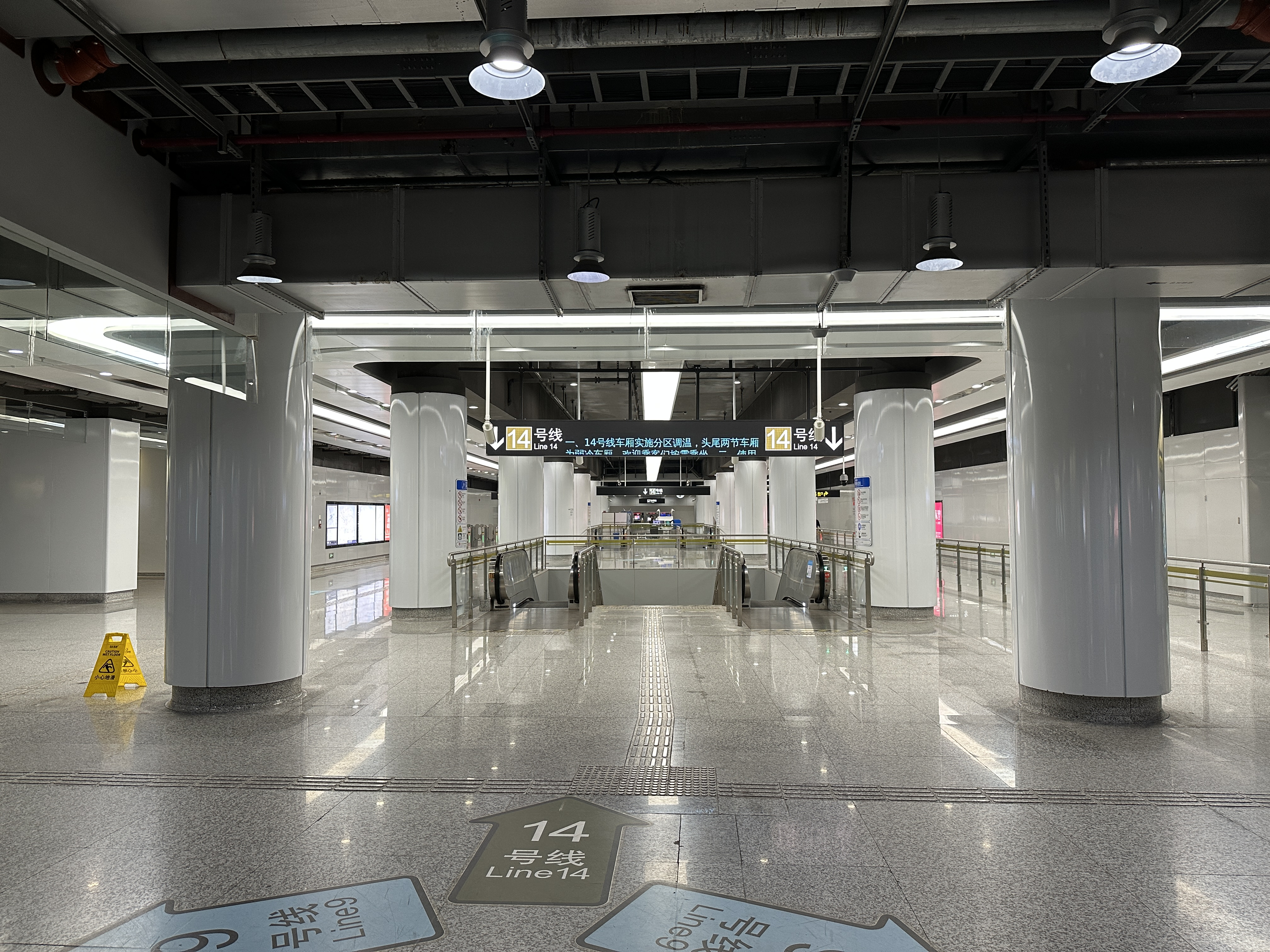
Line 14 concourse

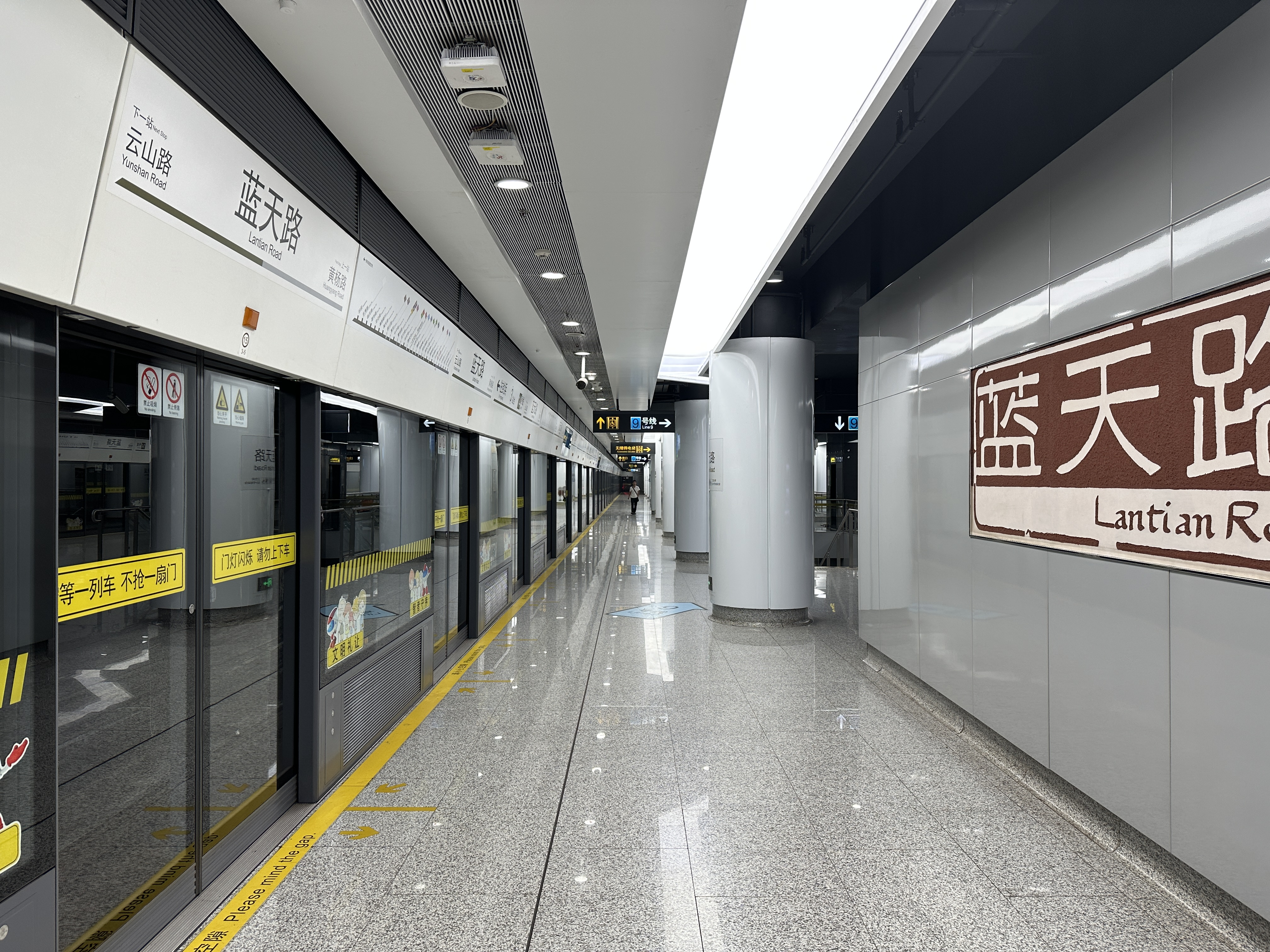
Line 14 platform
