= Shanghai Jincai Experimental Junior Middle School =

Coordinates: 31°13′38″N 121°33′07″E

- 上海市进才实验中学
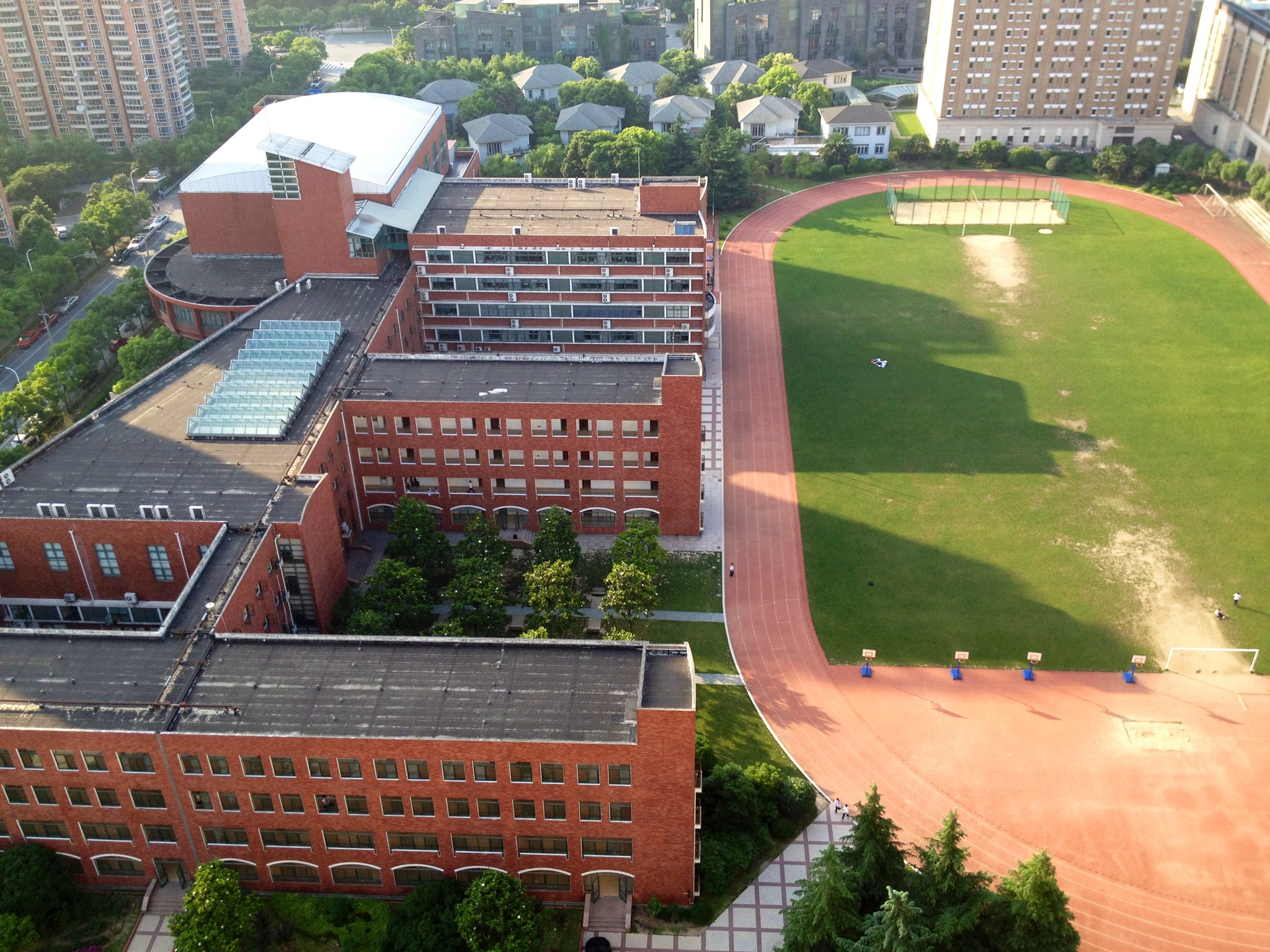
- 191 Jinsong Road, Shanghai

Information
- Type: Public Junior middle school
- Motto: 崇尚理性，独立思考
- Established: 2001
- School district: ChinaShanghaiPudong New District
- Principal: 盛红 (Sheng Hong)
- Staff: 111
- Faculty: 113
- Grades: 6 to 9
- Enrollment: 2,400
- area: 30,144.98m^2
- Website: www.jcsy.pudong-edu.sh.cn

Shanghai Jincai Experimental Junior Middle School (Chinese: 上海市进才实验中学), founded in 2001, is a junior middle school located in Pudong New District, Shanghai, China.
