= Shanghai Bus Route DZ418 =

Customised bus route in Shanghai, China

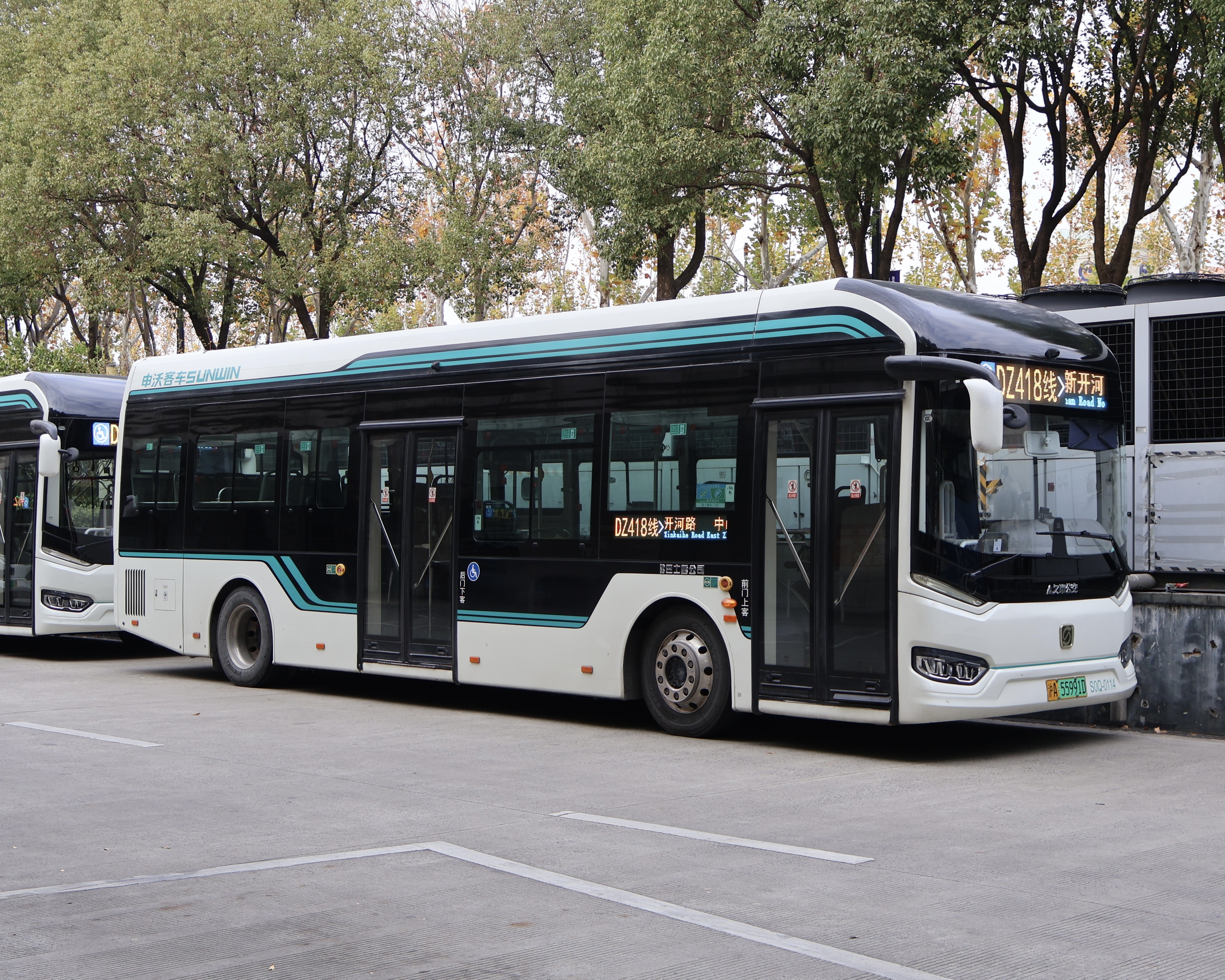
- A Sunwin iEV10 at the East Zhongshan Road No.2 & Xinkaihe Road terminus in December 2025.

Overview
- Operator: Shanghai Ba-Shi No.4 Public Transportation Co. Ltd
- Began service: 28 November 2022 (South Bund Financial District Direct Bus); 25 August 2025 (Route DZ418)

Route
- Route type: Bus route
- Start: East Zhongshan Road No.2 & Xinkaihe Road
- Via: Lujiabang Road, Waima Road, Dongjiadu Road, Zhonghua Road, Wangjiamatou Road, Dongmen Road
- End: Nanpu Bridge
- Length: 6 kilometres (3.7 mi)

Service
- Frequency: 3 minutes (07:30-09:30) 20 minutes (09:30-11:30, 13:30-17:30) 15 minutes (11:30-13:30) 5 minutes (17:30-19:30)
- Daily ridership: 2,000 (December 2023)

Route DZ418 is a customised bus route in Shanghai, China. Operated by Shanghai Ba-Shi No.4 Public Transportation Co. Ltd, a subsidiary of Jiushi Group, it runs between East Zhongshan Road No.2 & Xinkaihe Road and Nanpu Bridge, and primarily serves financial businesses located in South Bund. The route was first launched as the South Bund Financial District Direct Bus on 28 November 2022, before being renamed as route DZ418 on 25 August 2025.

== History ==
=== South Bund Financial District Direct Bus ===
The South Bund area houses many financial offices, including 14 corporate headquarters, employing around 33 thousand workers in total. The area has faced a lack of public transportation in the area, as most bus routes nearby do not directly connect to stops near the various office buildings, and the nearest metro station, Xiaonanmen on Line 9, is a 15 to 20 minutes walk away. On 28 November 2022, following coordination from the Xiaodongmen subdistrict and financial support provided by 11 companies in the area, 、trial operations began on a last mile connecting bus route between Xiaonanmen station and Jiushi Tower with two intermediate stops, named as the South Bund Financial District Direct Bus, with free rides provided for corporate employees. The route was operated by Shanghai Ba-Shi No.4 Public Transportation Co. Ltd, a subsidiary of Jiushi Group.

The route was later formally launched on 13 January 2023, with four stops along its 2 kilometres (1.2 mi) route and a journey time of 10 minutes. Journeys start from Xiaonanmen station towards Jiushi Tower during morning peak hours, and in the opposite direction during evening peak hours. On 29 May 2023, due to increased demand, the route was extended to Dongjiadu and the fleet was increased by one bus to four. As of December that year, ridership remained at around 2,000 passengers per day.

=== Route DZ418 ===
On 25 August 2025, due to further rises in demand, the route was renumbered as route DZ418 and amended to run between East Zhongshan Road No.2 & Xinkaihe Road and Nanpu Bridge with a length of 6 kilometres (3.7 mi), via Lujiabang Road, Waima Road, Dongjiadu Road, Zhonghua Road, Wangjiamatou Road and Dongmen Road. The route operates on weekdays, with frequencies of 3 minutes from 07:30 to 09:30, 5 minutes from 17:30 to 19:30, 15 minutes from 11:30 to 13:30, and 20 minutes during the remainder of its operating hours. The route was allocated nine buses when it was first introduced and increased to 12 buses by December.
