= Sijing station =

Shanghai Metro station

Sijing 泗泾
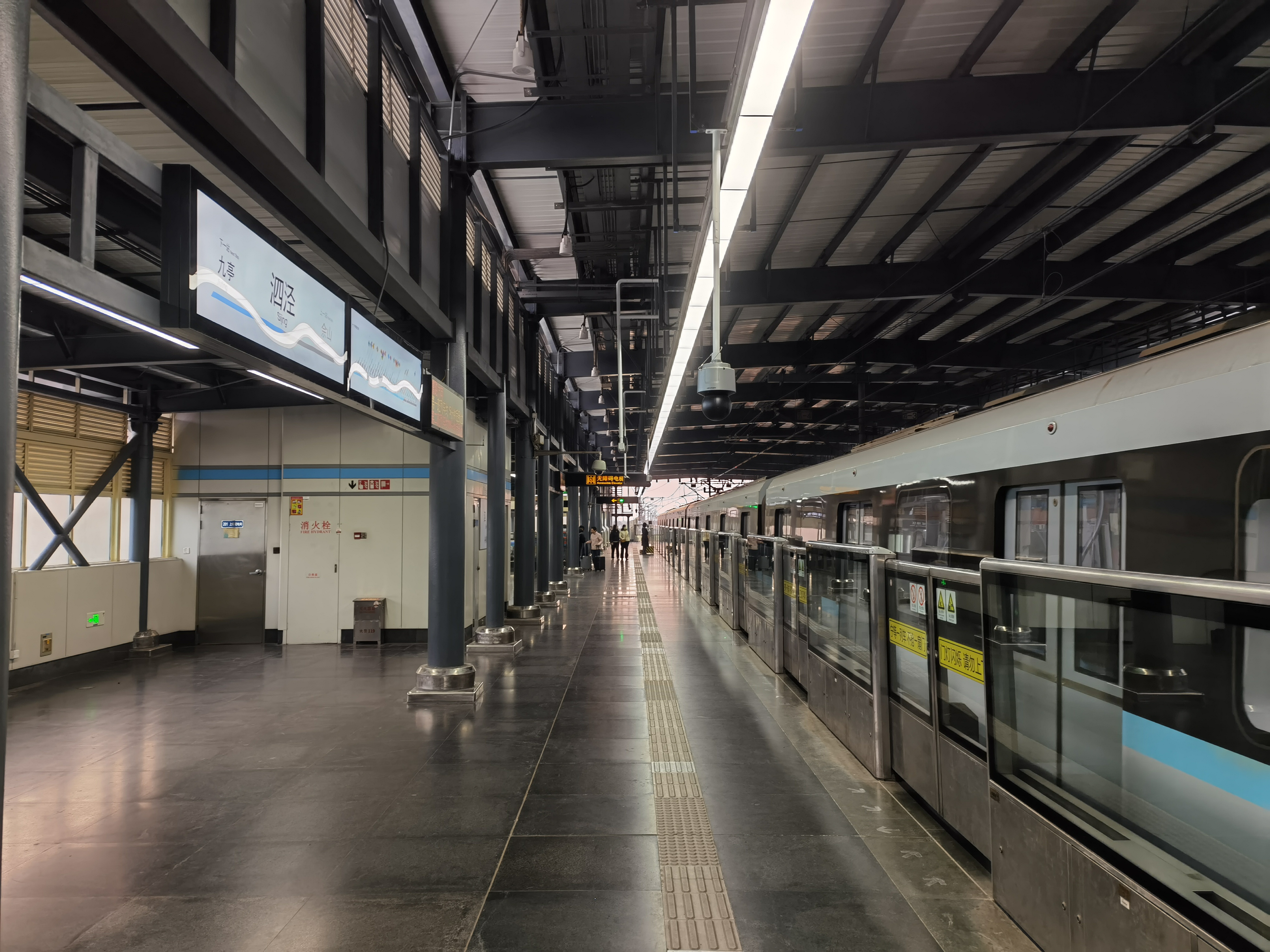
- Station platform

General information
- Location: Sijing, Songjiang District, Shanghai; China
- Coordinates: 31.1328°N 121.261°E
- Operator: Shanghai No. 1 Metro Operation Co. Ltd.
- Line: Line 9
- Platforms: 2 (2 side platforms)
- Tracks: 2

Construction
- Structure type: Elevated
- Accessible: Yes

History
- Opened: December 29, 2007

Services
Preceding station	Shanghai Metro	Following station
Sheshan towards Shanghai Songjiang Railway Station	Line 9	Jiuting towards Caolu
Location
- Location within Shanghai

Sijing (simplified Chinese: 泗泾; traditional Chinese: 泗涇; pinyin: Sìjīng) is a station on Shanghai Metro Line 9. It began operation on December 29, 2007. It is located in Sijing Town (泗泾镇) of Songjiang District.

This station can transfer to the bus routes Songjiang 45, Songjiang 46, Songjiang 46 local, Songjiang 47, Songjiang 48, Songjiang 57 (松江45,松江46,松江46区间，松江47,松江48,松江57), 191, and 191B. It has 2 places for entering and 2 places for exiting. South of the station is a bus station transferring to the routes 186 and Huchen line (local name: 沪陈线).
