= Dongjing station =

Shanghai Metro station

Dongjing 洞泾
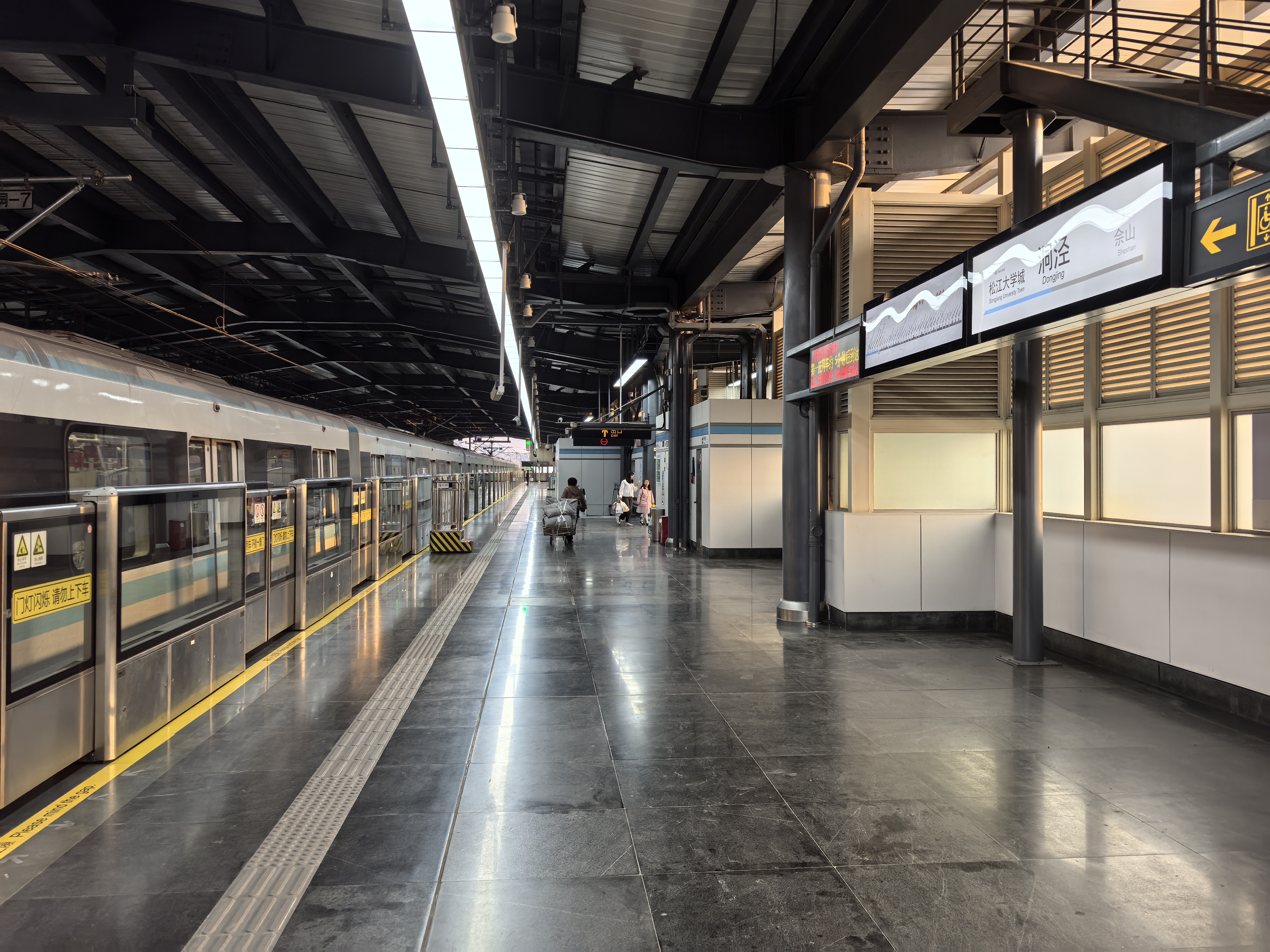
- Platform

General information
- Location: South Jiasong Road (嘉松南路) and Waiqingsong Highway (外青松公路); Dongjing Songjiang District, Shanghai; China
- Coordinates: 31.0869°N 121.226°E
- Operator: Shanghai No. 1 Metro Operation Co., Ltd.
- Line: Line 9
- Platforms: 2 (2 side platforms)
- Tracks: 2

Construction
- Structure type: Elevated
- Accessible: Yes

History
- Opened: December 29, 2007

Services
| Preceding station | Shanghai Metro | Following station |
|---|---|---|
| Songjiang University Town towards Shanghai Songjiang Railway Station | Line 9 | Sheshan towards Caolu |
Location
- Location within Shanghai

Dongjing (simplified Chinese: 洞泾; traditional Chinese: 洞涇; pinyin: Dòngjīng) is a station on Shanghai Metro Line 9. It is located in Dongjing Town, in Songjiang District.

The station began operations on December 29, 2007, as part of the initial phase of Line 9's development, which aimed to improve connectivity between the suburbs and central Shanghai. Dongjing Station primarily serves the suburban areas surrounding Songjiang and provides a crucial link between residential neighborhoods and the broader Shanghai Metro network. The station is also planned to serve the western extension of Line 12, which is currently under construction.
