= Shangcheng Road station =

Shanghai Metro station

Coordinates: 31°13′59″N 121°30′35″E

Shangcheng Road 商城路
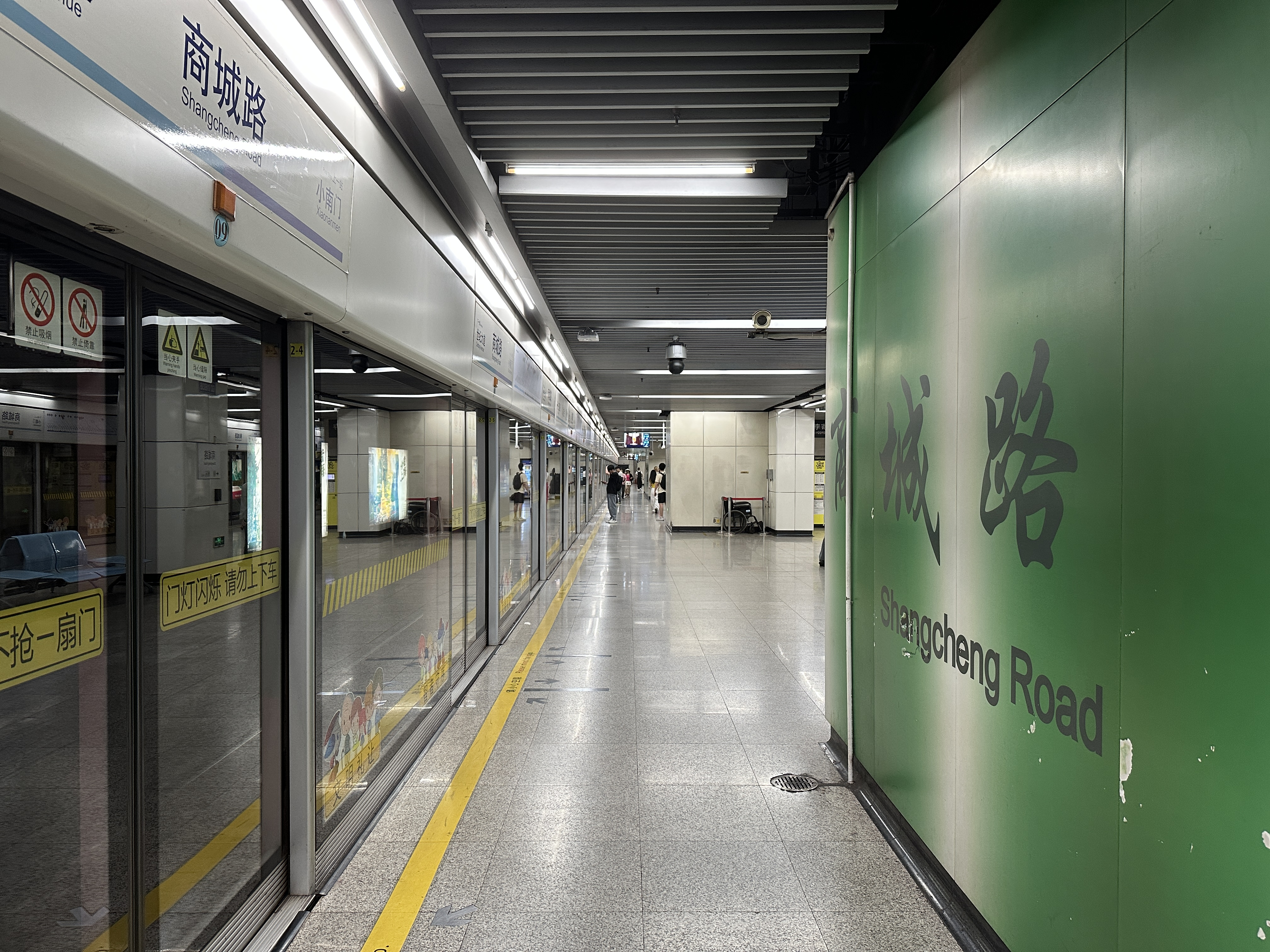
- Station platform in 2025

General information
- Location: Shangcheng Road (商城路) and South Pudong Road; Pudong, Shanghai; China
- Operator: Shanghai No. 1 Metro Operation Co. Ltd.
- Line: Line 9
- Platforms: 2 (1 island platform)
- Tracks: 2

Construction
- Structure type: Underground
- Accessible: Yes

History
- Opened: December 31, 2009

Services
Preceding station	Shanghai Metro	Following station
Xiaonanmen towards Shanghai Songjiang Railway Station	Line 9	Century Avenue towards Caolu
Location
- Location within Shanghai

Shangcheng Road (Chinese: 商城路; pinyin: Shāngchéng Lù) is a station on Shanghai Metro Line 9. It began operation on December 31, 2009. It is located at the intersection of South Pudong Road and Shangcheng Road.
