= Hechuan Road station =

Shanghai Metro station

Hechuan Road 合川路
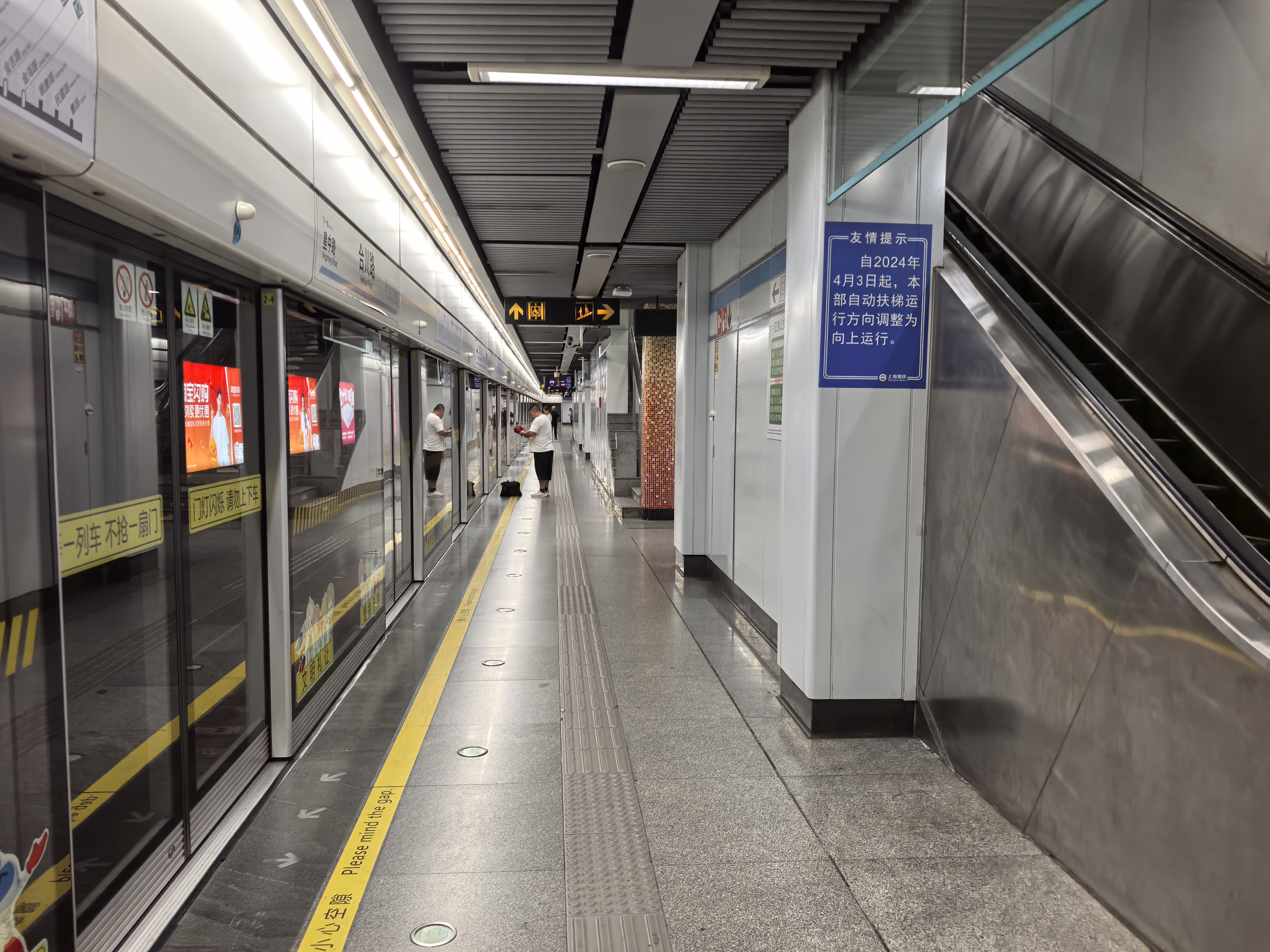
- Station platform

General information
- Location: Yishan Road (宜山路) and Hechuan Road; Minhang District, Shanghai; China
- Coordinates: 31.166701°N 121.384818°E
- Operator: Shanghai No. 1 Metro Operation Co. Ltd.
- Line: Line 9
- Platforms: 2 (1 island platform)
- Tracks: 2

Construction
- Structure type: Underground
- Accessible: Yes

History
- Opened: December 29, 2007

Services
Preceding station	Shanghai Metro	Following station
Xingzhong Road towards Shanghai Songjiang Railway Station	Line 9	Caohejing Hi-Tech Park towards Caolu
Location
- Location within Shanghai

Hechuan Road (Chinese: 合川路; pinyin: Héchuān Lù) is an underground station on Shanghai Metro Line 9. It began operation with the rest of Line 9 on December 29, 2007. It is located at the corner of Yishan Road and Hechuan Road.
