= Gutang Road station =

Shanghai Metro station

Gutang Road 顾唐路
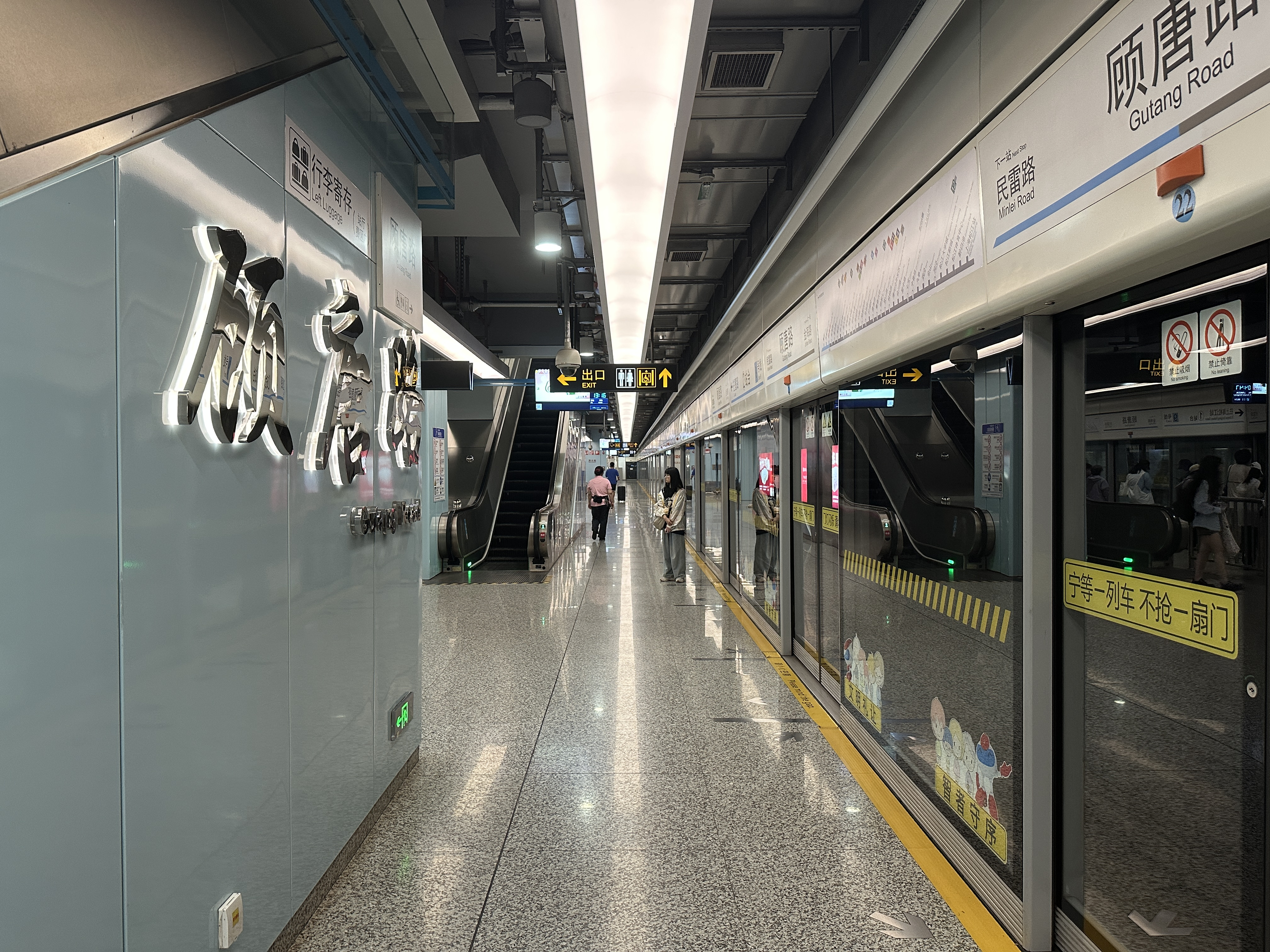
- Station platform

General information
- Location: Jinhai Road (金海路) and Gutang Road (顾唐路); Pudong New Area, Shanghai; China
- Coordinates: 31.268179°N 121.652136°E
- Operator: Shanghai No. 1 Metro Operation Co. Ltd.
- Line: Line 9
- Platforms: 2 (1 island platform)
- Tracks: 2

Construction
- Structure type: Underground
- Accessible: Yes

History
- Opened: December 30, 2017

Services
Preceding station	Shanghai Metro	Following station
Jinhai Road towards Shanghai Songjiang Railway Station	Line 9	Minlei Road towards Caolu
Location
- Location within Shanghai

Gutang Road (simplified Chinese: 顾唐路; traditional Chinese: 顧唐路; pinyin: Gùtáng Lù) is a station on Line 9 of the Shanghai Metro. The station is located on Jinhai Road at Gutang Road, between Jinhai Road and Minlei Road stations. It began passenger trial operation with the rest of phase 3 of Line 9, an easterly extension with 9 new stations, on December 30, 2017.
