= Songjiang University Town station =

Shanghai Metro station

Songjiang University Town 松江大学城
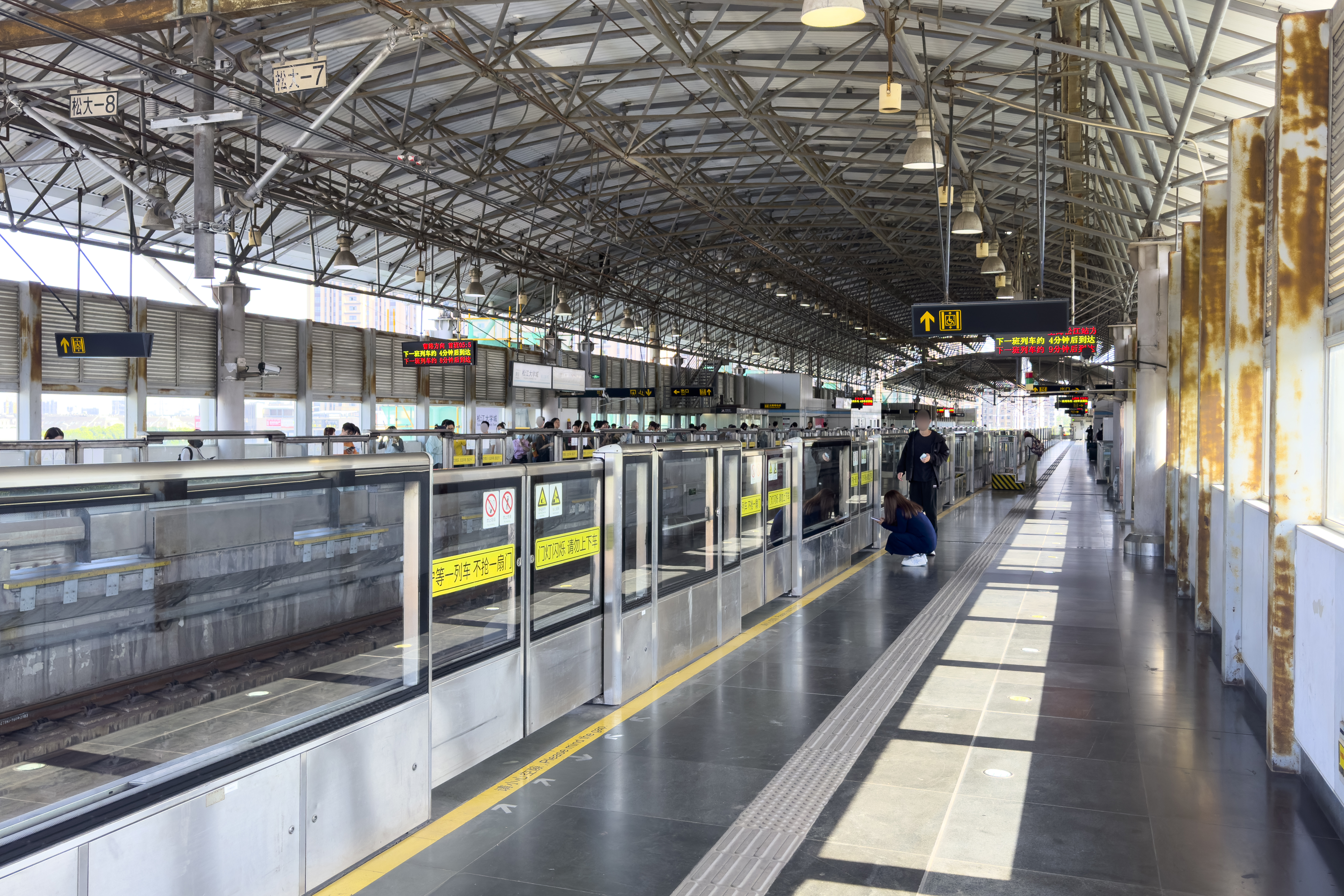

General information
- Location: South Jiasong Road (嘉松南路); Songjiang University Town, Songjiang District, Shanghai; China
- Coordinates: 31°3′23″N 121°13′43″E
- Operator: Shanghai No. 1 Metro Operation Co. Ltd.
- Line: Line 9
- Platforms: 2 (2 side platforms)
- Tracks: 2
- Connections: T2

Construction
- Structure type: Elevated
- Accessible: Yes

History
- Opened: 29 December 2007

Services
Preceding station	Shanghai Metro	Following station
Songjiang Xincheng towards Shanghai Songjiang Railway Station	Line 9	Dongjing towards Caolu
Location
- Location within Shanghai

Songjiang University Town (simplified Chinese: 松江大学城; traditional Chinese: 松江大學城; pinyin: Sōngjiāng Dàxuéchéng) is a station on Shanghai Metro Line 9. It began operations on 29 December 2007. This station is situated in Songjiang University Town.
