= Caohejing Hi-Tech Park station =

Shanghai Metro station

Caohejing Hi-Tech Park 漕河泾开发区
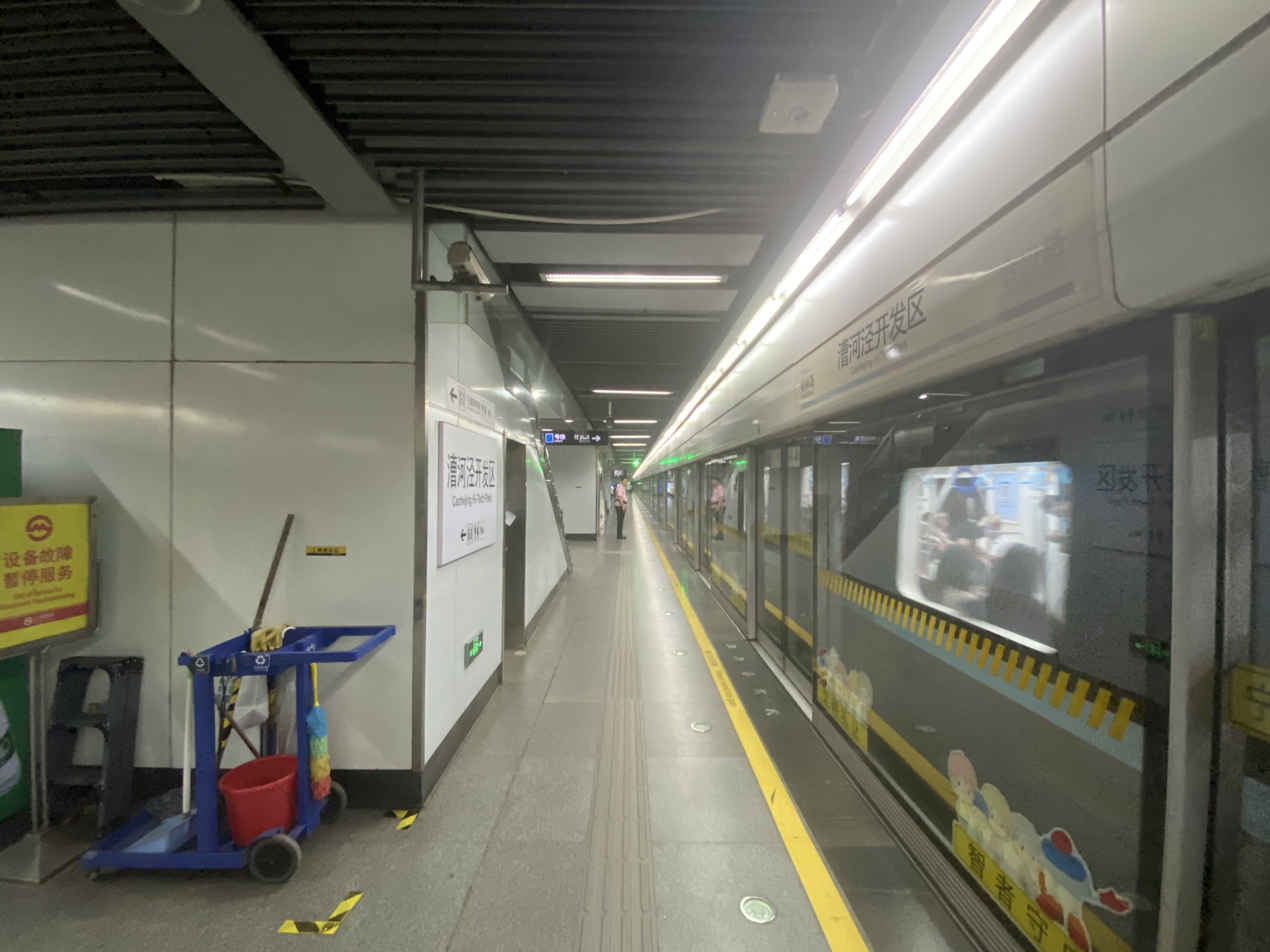
- Station platform

General information
- Location: Hongmei Road and Yishan Road; Xuhui District and Minhang District border, Shanghai; China
- Coordinates: 31.1728°N 121.393°E
- Operator: Shanghai No. 1 Metro Operation Co. Ltd.
- Line: Line 9
- Platforms: 2 (1 island platform)
- Tracks: 2

Construction
- Structure type: Underground
- Accessible: Yes

History
- Opened: December 29, 2007

Services
Preceding station	Shanghai Metro	Following station
Hechuan Road towards Shanghai Songjiang Railway Station	Line 9	Guilin Road towards Caolu
Location
- Location within Shanghai

Caohejing Hi-Tech Park (simplified Chinese: 漕河泾开发区; traditional Chinese: 漕河涇開發區; pinyin: Cáohéjīng Kāifāqū) is the name of a subway station on Shanghai Metro Line 9.

== Location ==
It is a subway station on Shanghai Metro Line 9.
