= Jiuting station =

Shanghai Metro station

Jiuting 九亭
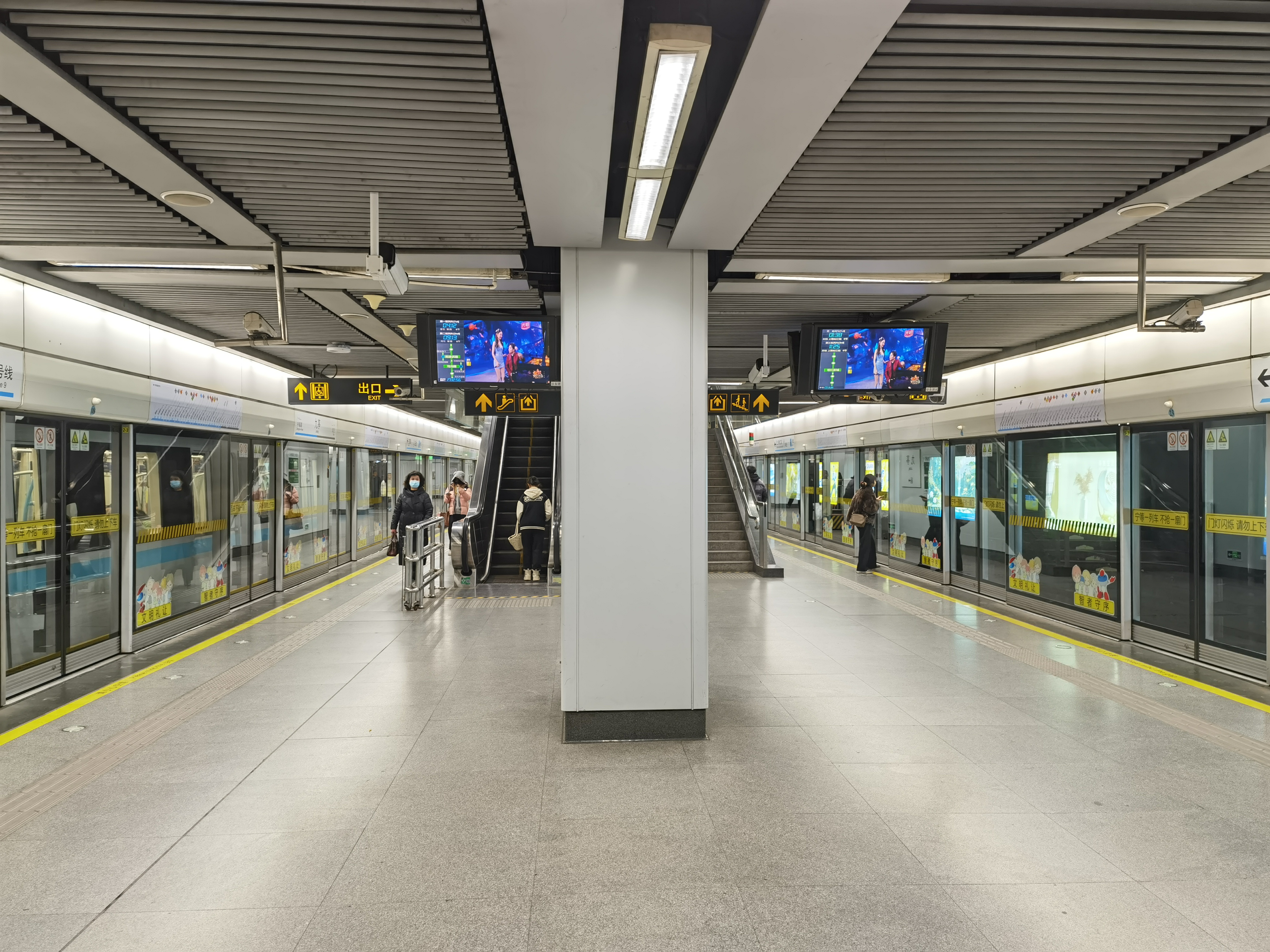
- Station platform

General information
- Location: Jiuting, Songjiang District, Shanghai; China
- Coordinates: 31.1394°N 121.314°E
- Operator: Shanghai No. 1 Metro Operation Co. Ltd.
- Line: Line 9
- Platforms: 2 (1 island platform)
- Tracks: 2

Construction
- Structure type: Underground
- Accessible: Yes

History
- Opened: December 29, 2007

Services
Preceding station	Shanghai Metro	Following station
Sijing towards Shanghai Songjiang Railway Station	Line 9	Zhongchun Road towards Caolu
Location
- Location within Shanghai

Jiuting (Chinese: 九亭; pinyin: Jiǔtíng) was a station on Shanghai Metro Line 9. It began operation on December 29, 2007. It is located in Jiuting Town of Songjiang District. Upon exiting the station through the south exit, there are a variety of small shops and restaurants in a mini-mall format, including McDonald's and KFC. It is confirmed to have closed.

North Huting Road is the primary North-South street immediately adjacent to the station. Traveling south will take you into old Jiuting downtown. Traveling north will take you into a newer area with shops, apartment housing and restaurants.

Jiuting is approximately 15 minutes by taxi from Shanghai Hongqiao International Airport.
