= Sheshan station =

Shanghai Metro station

Sheshan 佘山
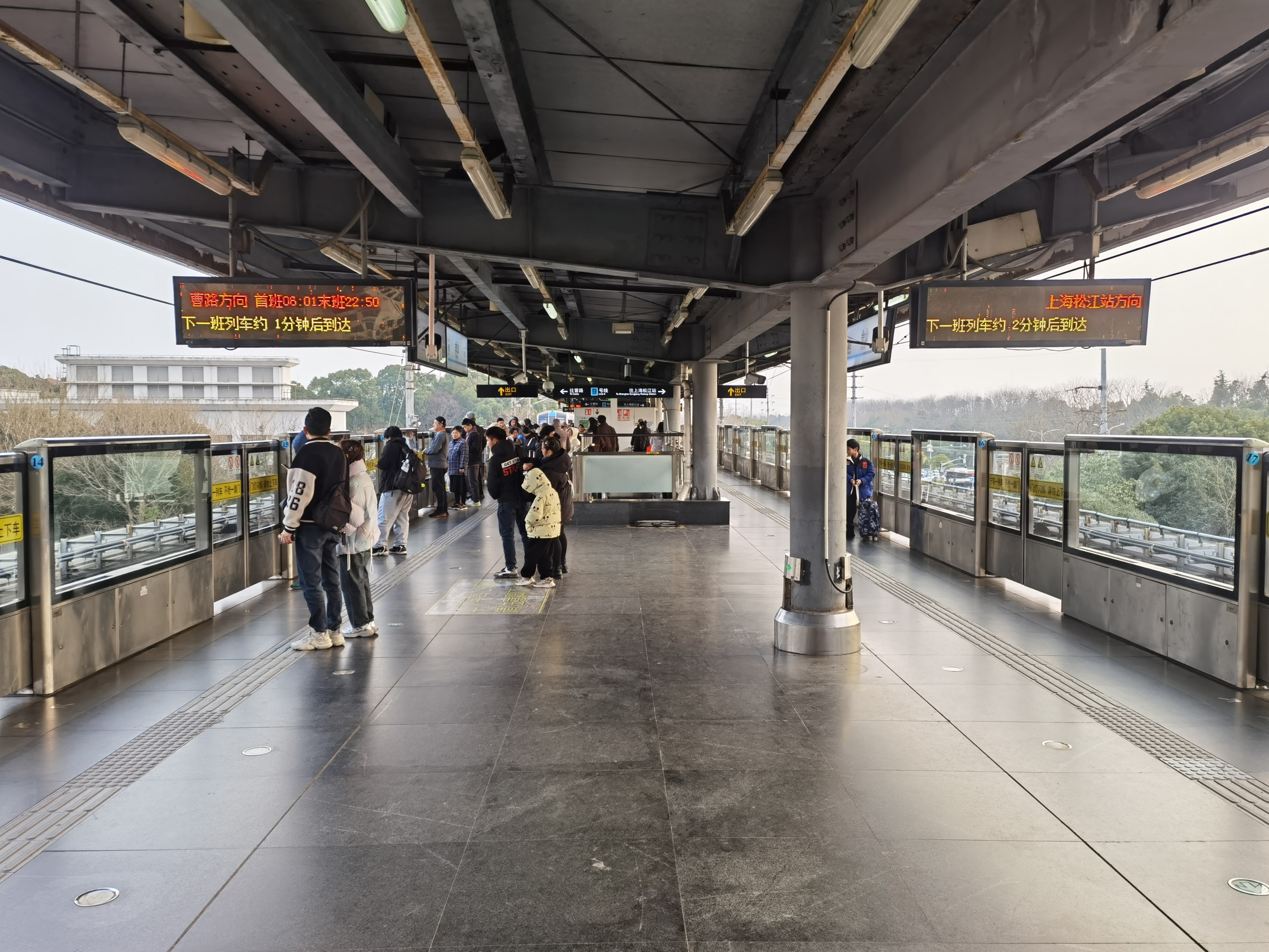
- Station platform

General information
- Location: South Jiasong Road (嘉松南路); Sijing, Songjiang District, Shanghai; China
- Coordinates: 31.10642°N 121.22533°E
- Operator: Shanghai No. 1 Metro Operation Co. Ltd.
- Line: Line 9
- Platforms: 2 (1 island platform)
- Tracks: 2

Construction
- Structure type: Elevated
- Accessible: Yes

History
- Opened: December 29, 2007

Services
Preceding station	Shanghai Metro	Following station
Dongjing towards Shanghai Songjiang Railway Station	Line 9	Sijing towards Caolu
Location
- Location within Shanghai

Sheshan (Chinese: 佘山; pinyin: Shéshān) is the name of an elevated station on Shanghai Metro Line 9. It is located near Sheshan Hill. Sheshan Station serves as a rush hour terminus of some trains on Line 9.
