= Xingzhong Road station =

Shanghai Metro station

Xingzhong Road 星中路
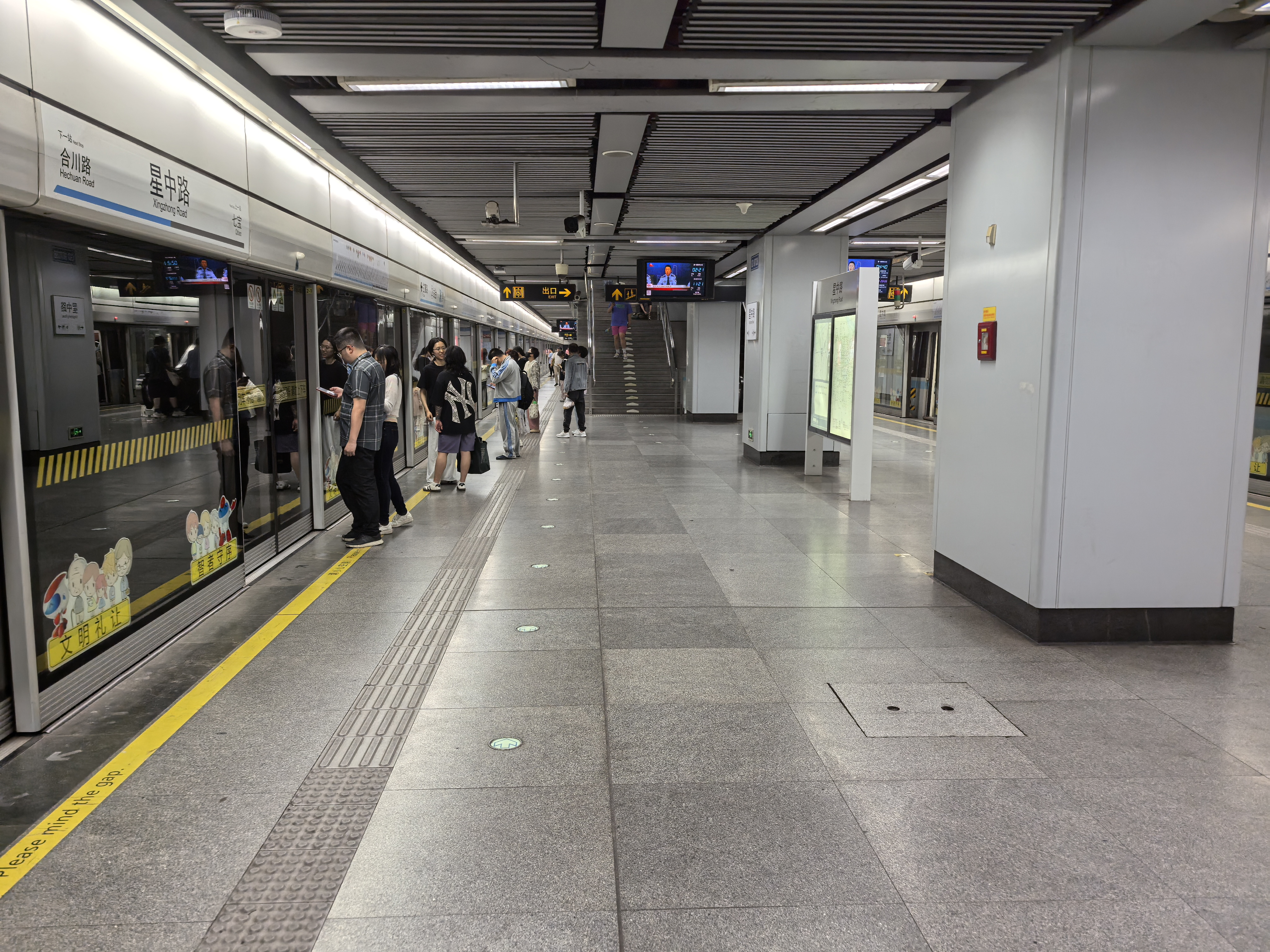
- Station platform

General information
- Location: Caobao Road and Xingzhong Road (星中路); Minhang District, Shanghai; China
- Coordinates: 31.1603°N 121.364°E
- Operator: Shanghai No. 1 Metro Operation Co. Ltd.
- Line: Line 9
- Platforms: 2 (1 island platform)
- Tracks: 2

Construction
- Structure type: Underground
- Accessible: Yes

History
- Opened: December 29, 2007

Services
Preceding station	Shanghai Metro	Following station
Qibao towards Shanghai Songjiang Railway Station	Line 9	Hechuan Road towards Caolu
Location
- Location within Shanghai

Xingzhong Road (Chinese: 星中路; pinyin: Xīngzhōng Lù) is a station on Shanghai Metro Line 9. It began operation on December 29, 2007. It is located at Caobao Road and Xingzhong Road.
