= Minlei Road station =

Shanghai Metro station

Minlei Road 民雷路
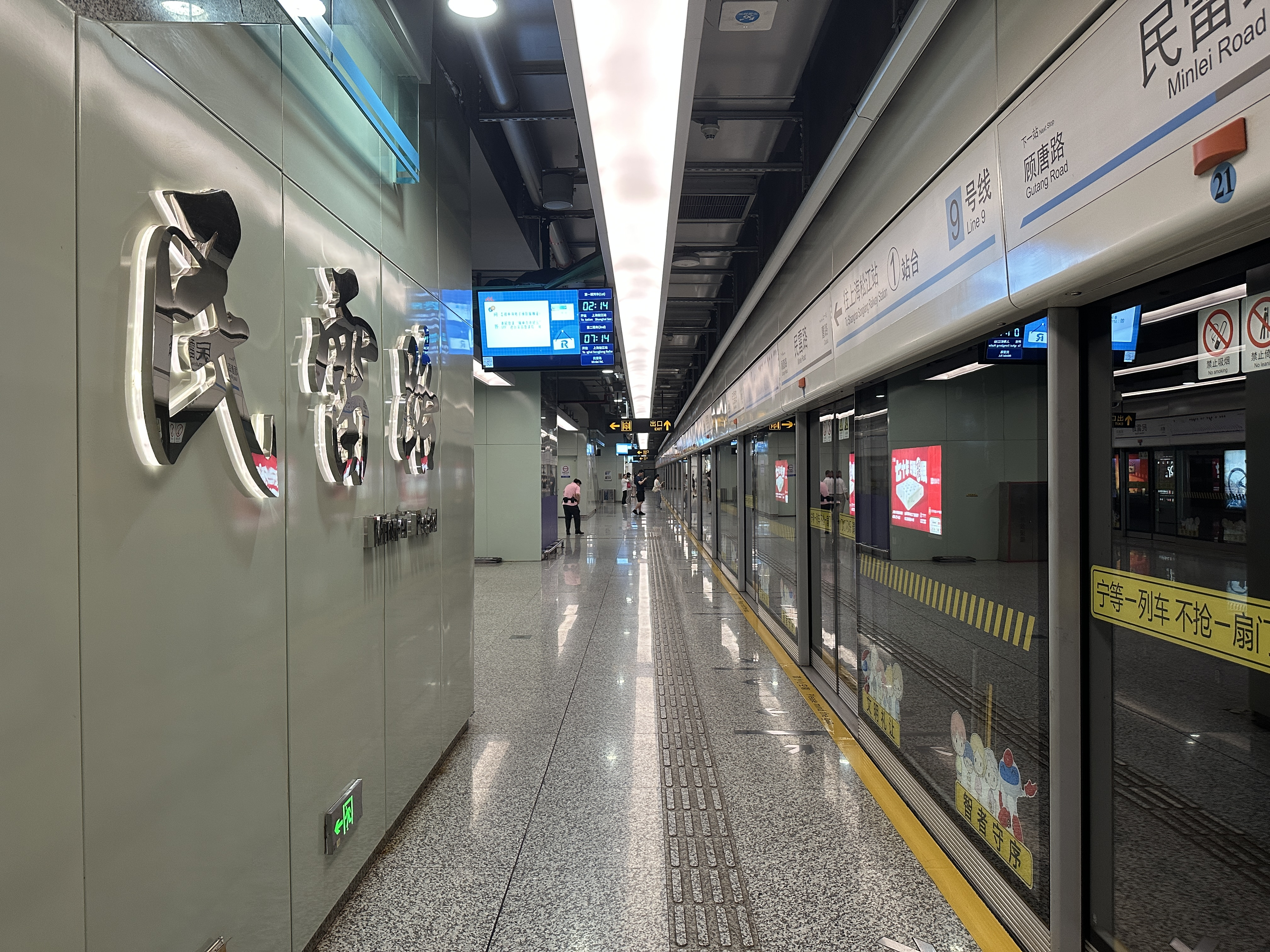
- Station platform

General information
- Location: Jinhai Road (金海路) and Minlei Road (民雷路); Caolu, Pudong New Area, Shanghai; China
- Coordinates: 31.270490°N 121.663841°E
- Operator: Shanghai No. 1 Metro Operation Co. Ltd.
- Line: Line 9
- Platforms: 2 (1 island platform)
- Tracks: 2

Construction
- Structure type: Underground
- Accessible: Yes

History
- Opened: December 30, 2017

Services
Preceding station	Shanghai Metro	Following station
Gutang Road towards Shanghai Songjiang Railway Station	Line 9	Caolu Terminus
Location
- Location within Shanghai

Minlei Road (Chinese: 民雷路; pinyin: Mínléi Lù) is a station on Line 9 of the Shanghai Metro. The station is located on Jinhai Road at Minlei Road, between Gutang Road and Caolu stations, the eastern terminus of the line. It began passenger trial operation with the rest of phase 3 of Line 9, an easterly extension with 9 new stations, on December 30, 2017.
