= Xiaonanmen station (Shanghai Metro) =

Shanghai Metro station

Xiaonanmen 小南门
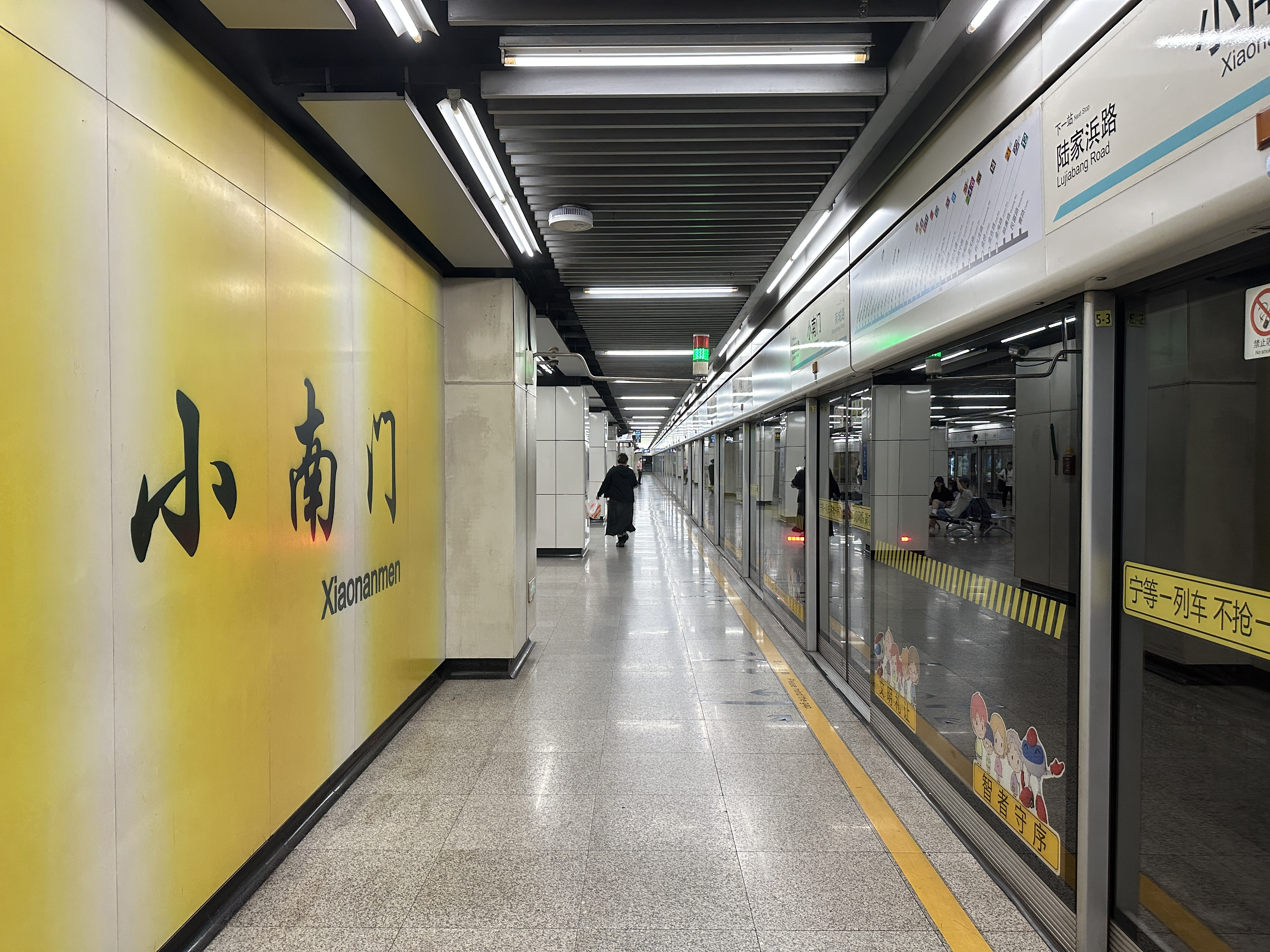
- Station platform

General information
- Location: Zhonghua Road (中华路) and Wangjia Matou Road (王家码头路); Huangpu District, Shanghai; China
- Coordinates: 31.2192°N 121.494°E
- Operator: Shanghai No. 1 Metro Operation Co. Ltd.
- Line: Line 9
- Platforms: 2 (1 island platform)
- Tracks: 2

Construction
- Structure type: Underground
- Accessible: Yes

History
- Opened: December 31, 2009

Services
Preceding station	Shanghai Metro	Following station
Lujiabang Road towards Shanghai Songjiang Railway Station	Line 9	Shangcheng Road towards Caolu
Location
- Location within Shanghai

Xiaonanmen (simplified Chinese: 小南门; traditional Chinese: 小南門; pinyin: Xiǎonánmén; lit. 'little south gate') is a station on Line 9 of the Shanghai Metro. As part of the line's phase 2 easterly extension, it began operation on December 31, 2009. It is the first station in Puxi when travelling southwest-bound on Line 9 from Pudong.
