= Line 9 (Shanghai Metro) =

Metro line in Shanghai

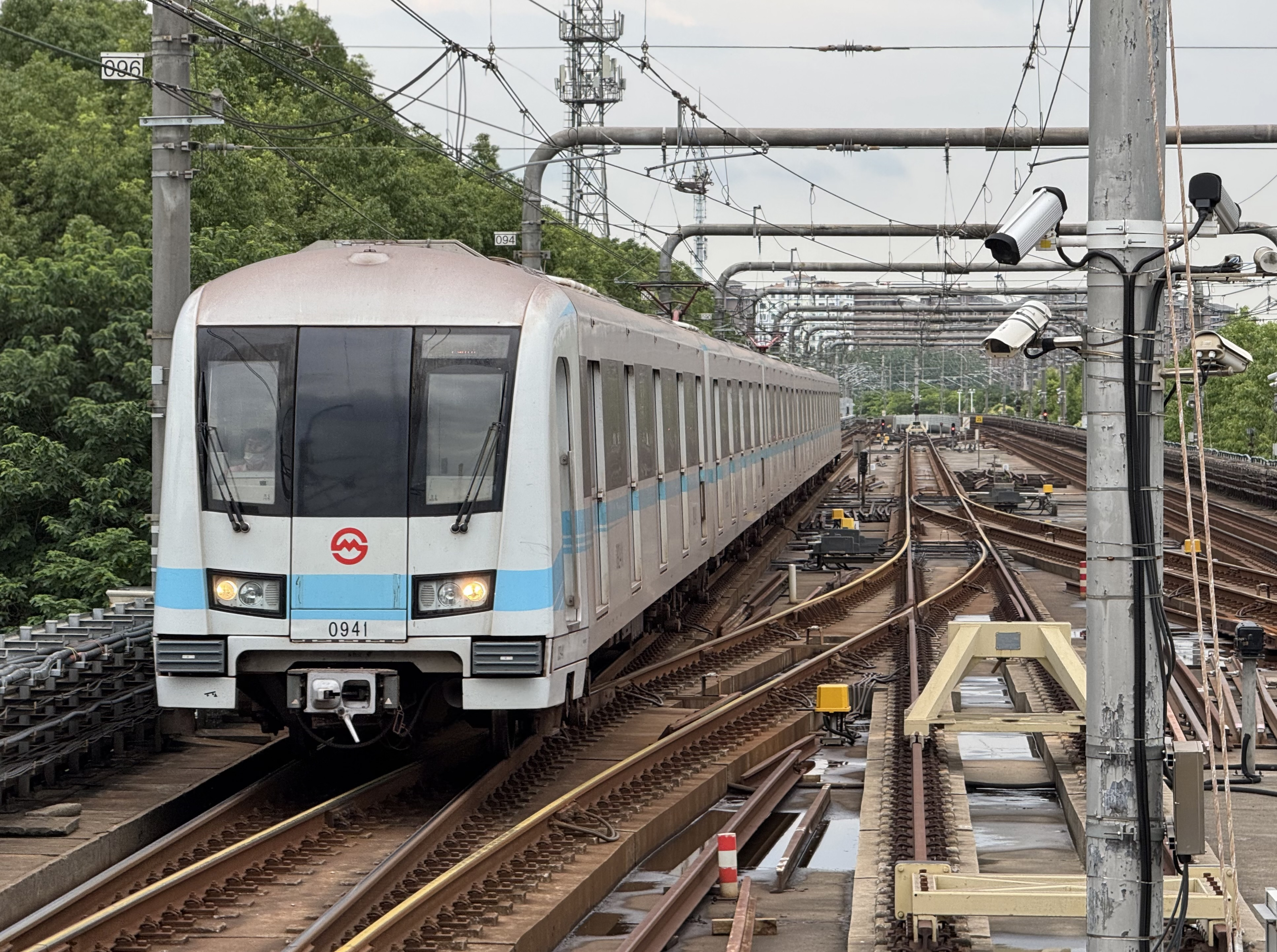
- An AC09 (09A02) train enters Sheshan station

Overview
- Other name(s): R4 (planned name); Shensong line (Chinese: 申松线)
- Native name: 上海地铁9号线
- Status: Operational
- Owner: Shanghai Rail Transit Shensong Line Development Co., Ltd.
- Locale: Pudong; Huangpu, Xuhui, Minhang and Songjiang districts, Shanghai, China
- Termini: Songjiang South Railway Station; Caolu
- Stations: 35

Service
- Type: Rapid transit
- System: Shanghai Metro
- Services: Mainline: Songjiang South Railway Station ↔ Caolu; AM Peak: Sheshan ↔ Jinji Road; Partial Mainline: Sheshan ↔ Middle Yanggao Road
- Operator: Shanghai No. 1 Metro Operation Co. Ltd.
- Depot(s): Jiuting Depot; Jinqiao Yard
- Rolling stock: 09A01; 09A02; 09A03; 09A04
- Daily ridership: 1.288 million (2019 peak)

History
- Work began: October 31, 2002; 23 years ago
- Opened: December 29, 2007; 18 years ago
- Last extension: December 30, 2017; 8 years ago

Technical
- Line length: 63.8 km (39.64 mi)
- Number of tracks: 2
- Character: Underground (Jiuting to Caolu), and elevated (Songjiang University Town to Sijing)
- Track gauge: 1,435 mm (4 ft 8 1/2 in)
- Electrification: Overhead lines (1500 volts)
- Operating speed: 80 km/h (50 mph); Average speed: 39.1 km/h (24 mph)
- Signalling: Thales' SelTracTM CBTC
Route map
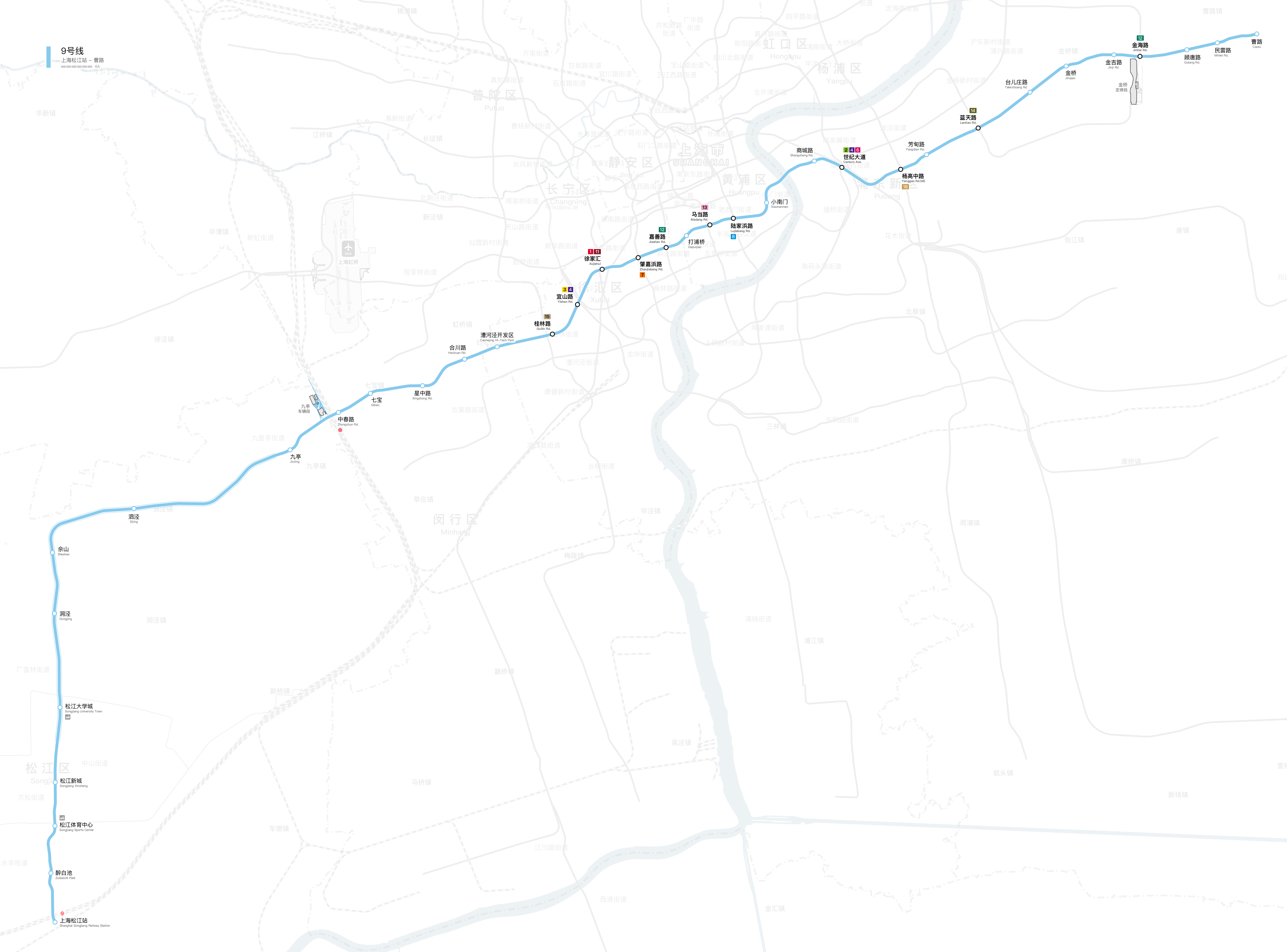

Line 9 is a southwest-northeast line of the Shanghai Metro network. The line runs from Shanghai Songjiang Railway Station in Songjiang District to Caolu in Pudong. The line is colored light blue on system maps.

== History ==
In the initial planning of Line 9, the entire line was from Fengjing to Chongming Island. Later, the plan to extend to Fengjing was cancelled, and the section to Chongming Island was changed to Chongming line.

The first phase of Line 9, from Songjiang Xincheng to Guilin Road stations, opened on December 29, 2007. It uses the Bombardier Movia trains which were lent to line 1.

Line 9 did not directly connect to the rest of the Shanghai Metro network until the opening of the Line 9 portion of the Yishan Road station on December 28, 2008. The station is an interchange between lines 3 and 4. A shuttle bus conveyed passengers between Guilin Road and Yishan Road stations until construction was completed.

In December 2009, the second phase of line 9 (from Yishan Road to Century Avenue) was completed, providing passengers with a direct link from Songjiang District in the west to Pudong in the east without having to transfer to other lines.

On April 7, 2010, the extension to Middle Yanggao Road Station was completed.

On December 30, 2012, the extension from Songjiang New City to Songjiang South Railway Station was opened.

On December 30, 2017, the line's east extension, consisting of nine stations from Middle Yanggao Road to Caolu, entered operation.

Shanghai Metro Line 9 opening history
Segment	Commencement	Opened	Length	Station(s)	Name	Investment
Songjiang Xincheng — Guilin Road	31 Oct 2002	29 Dec 2007	29.013 km (18.03 mi)	12	Phase 1 (initial section)	¥19 billion
Guilin Road — Yishan Road	31 Oct 2002	28 Dec 2008	1.687 km (1.05 mi)	1	Phase 1 (final section)	¥19 billion
Yishan Road — Century Avenue	31 Aug 2005	31 Dec 2009	11.491 km (7.14 mi)	9	Phase 2 (initial section)	¥8.94 billion
Century Avenue — Middle Yanggao Road	31 Aug 2005	7 Apr 2010	2.435 km (1.51 mi)	1	Phase 2 (final section)	¥8.94 billion
Songjiang South — Songjiang Xincheng	15 Oct 2009	30 Dec 2012	6.474 km (4.02 mi)	3	Phase 3 (southern section)	¥2.8 billion
Middle Yanggao Road — Caolu	11 Aug 2011	30 Dec 2017	14.099 km (8.76 mi)	9	Phase 3 (eastern section)	¥12.713 billion

== Stations ==
=== Service routes ===
Shanghai Metro Line 9 service routes
M - Mainline: Shanghai Songjiang Railway Station ↔ Caolu; AM - AM Peak line: Sheshan ↔ Jinji Road; P - Partial Mainline: Sheshan ↔ Middle Yanggao Road
Routes			Station name		Connections	Distance			Location	Open- ing	Plat- form
M	AM	P	English	Chinese	Connections	km		min	Location	Open- ing	Plat- form
●			Shanghai Songjiang Railway Station (Note: Was Songjiang South Railway Station (松江南站))	上海松江站	IMH	0.00		0	Songjiang	30 Dec 2012	Underground island
●			Zuibaichi Park	醉白池	SAH	1.79		3	Songjiang	30 Dec 2012	Underground island
●			Songjiang Sports Center	松江体育中心	T1 T2	1.73	3.53	6	Songjiang	30 Dec 2012	Underground island
●			Songjiang Xincheng	松江新城		1.58	5.15	9	Songjiang	29 Dec 2007	Underground island
●			Songjiang University Town	松江大学城	T2	2.64	7.75	12	Songjiang	29 Dec 2007	Elevated side
●			Dongjing	洞泾		3.38	11.13	17	Songjiang	29 Dec 2007	Elevated side
●	●	●	Sheshan	佘山		2.20	13.34	20	Songjiang	29 Dec 2007	Elevated island
●	●	●	Sijing	泗泾		3.86	17.21	24	Songjiang	29 Dec 2007	Elevated side
●	●	●	Jiuting	九亭		6.24	23.45	31	Songjiang	29 Dec 2007	Underground island
●	●	●	Zhongchun Road	中春路	Airport Link	2.26	25.72	34	Minhang	29 Dec 2007	Underground side & island
●	●	●	Qibao	七宝		1.30	27.02	37	Minhang	29 Dec 2007	Underground island
●	●	●	Xingzhong Road	星中路		1.88	28.90	40	Minhang	29 Dec 2007	Underground island
●	●	●	Hechuan Road	合川路		1.85	30.76	43	Minhang	29 Dec 2007	Underground island
●	●	●	Caohejing Hi-Tech Park	漕河泾开发区		1.33	32.09	45	Xuhui	29 Dec 2007	Underground island
●	●	●	Guilin Road	桂林路	15	2.03	34.12	48	Xuhui	29 Dec 2007	Underground side & island
●	●	●	Yishan Road	宜山路	3 4	1.68	35.81	51	Xuhui	28 Dec 2008	Underground island
●	●	●	Xujiahui	徐家汇	1 11	1.50	37.32	53	Xuhui	31 Dec 2009	Underground island
●	●	●	Zhaojiabang Road	肇嘉浜路	7	1.38	38.70	56	Xuhui	31 Dec 2009	Underground island
●	●	●	Jiashan Road	嘉善路	12	1.06	39.77	58	Xuhui	31 Dec 2009	Underground island
●	●	●	Dapuqiao	打浦桥		0.87	40.64	60	Huangpu	31 Dec 2009	Underground island
●	●	●	Madang Road	马当路	13	0.84	41.48	62	Huangpu	31 Dec 2009	Underground side
●	●	●	Lujiabang Road	陆家浜路	8	0.94	42.43	64	Huangpu	31 Dec 2009	Underground island
●	●	●	Xiaonanmen	小南门		1.47	43.90	66	Huangpu	31 Dec 2009	Underground island
●	●	●	Shangcheng Road	商城路		2.39	46.30	70	Pudong	31 Dec 2009	Underground island
●	●	●	Century Avenue	世纪大道	2 4 6	0.97	47.28	72	Pudong	31 Dec 2009	Underground island
●	●	●	Middle Yanggao Road	杨高中路	18	2.43	49.72	75	Pudong	7 April 2010	Underground island
●	●		Fangdian Road	芳甸路		1.06	50.78	77	Pudong	30 Dec 2017	Underground island
●	●		Lantian Road	蓝天路	14	2.12	52.90	80	Pudong	30 Dec 2017	Underground island
●	●		Taierzhuang Road	台儿庄路		2.30	55.21	84	Pudong	30 Dec 2017	Underground island
●	●		Jinqiao	金桥		1.54	56.75	86	Pudong	30 Dec 2017	Underground island
●	●		Jinji Road	金吉路		1.69	58.45	89	Pudong	30 Dec 2017	Underground island
●			Jinhai Road	金海路	12	1.02	59.47	91	Pudong	30 Dec 2017	Underground island
●			Gutang Road	顾唐路		1.71	61.19	93	Pudong	30 Dec 2017	Underground island
●			Minlei Road	民雷路		1.12	62.31	96	Pudong	30 Dec 2017	Underground island
●			Caolu	曹路		1.50	63.82	98	Pudong	30 Dec 2017	Underground island

=== Important stations ===
- Songjiang University Town - the collection of several top universities in Shanghai, including Donghua University, Shanghai International Studies University, East China University of Politics and Law, Shanghai Institute of Foreign Trade are located there.
- Sheshan - serving Sheshan Hill, a tourist and pilgrimage destination with the Sheshan Observatory and the Sheshan Basilica.
- Qibao - serving the old town of Qibao.
- Caohejing Hi-Tech Park - serving the high-tech park Caohejing.
- Xujiahui - one of the busiest metro stations in Shanghai, with shopping malls and office buildings in the vicinity; interchange with lines 1 and 11.
- Century Avenue - a major interchange station on four lines; interchange with lines 2, 4 and 6.
- Sijing - Sijing Station, located in Songjiang District, Shanghai, is an elevated side platform station on Line 9 of the Shanghai Metro, opened on December 29, 2007. From 2019 to 2023, Sijing has consistently been the busiest metro station in all of Shanghai, with no other station able to surpass it. This is due to its location in a densely populated residential area, limited alternative transportation options, and its role as a key transit hub for commuters heading to industrial zones, educational institutions, and central Shanghai. As a stop on Line 9, Sijing connects the district to the city's core, leading to heavy passenger flows, particularly during rush hours. Frequent human flow restrictions in the station reflect the station’s struggle to manage the immense crowding it experiences daily.
- Yishan Road - Located on Kaixuan Road in Xuhui District, Shanghai, Yishan Road Station serves as an interchange hub for Lines 3, 4, and 9. It plays a critical role in connecting parts of the city through multiple lines, making it an important stop on the network.
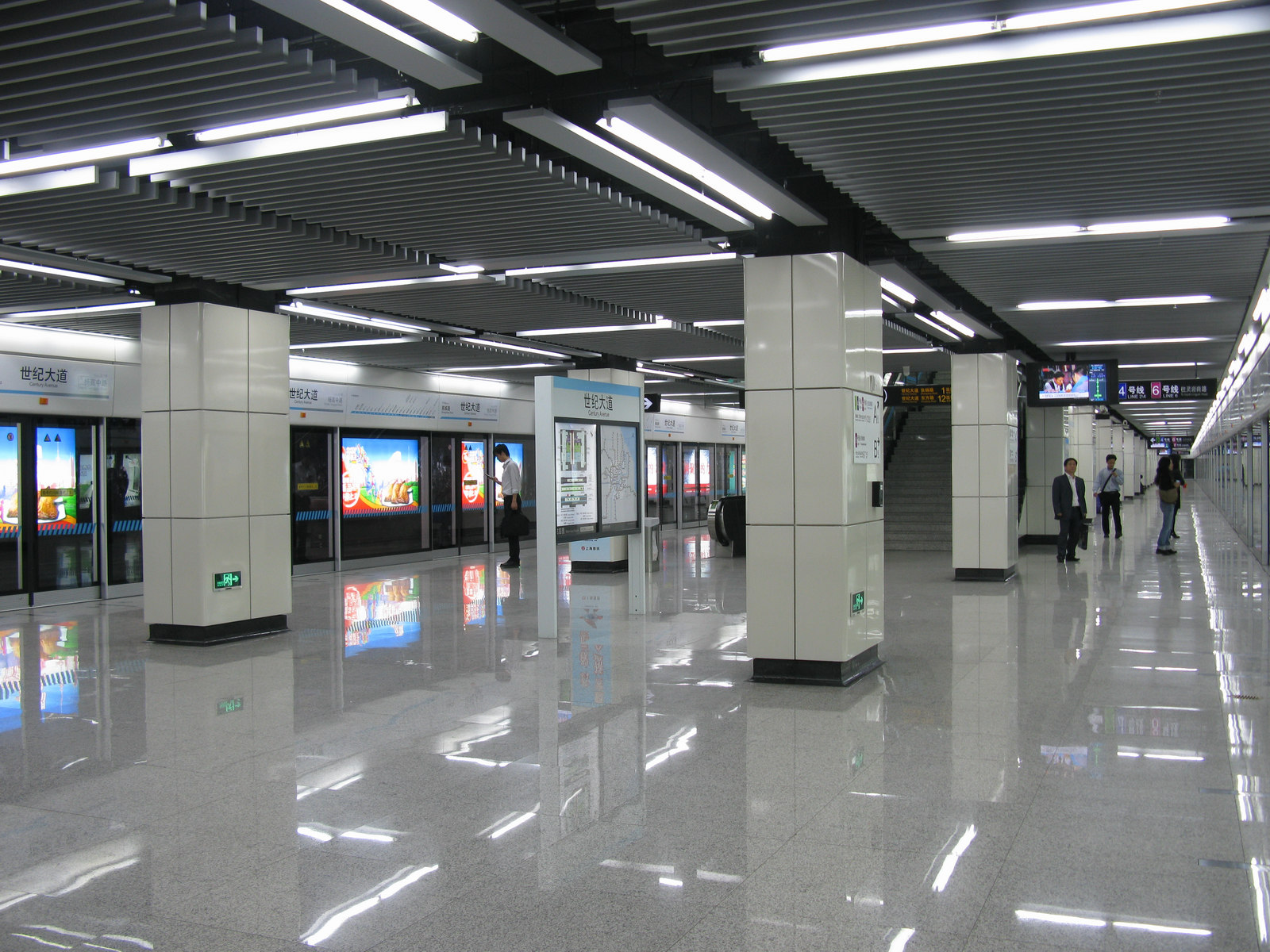
Century Avenue station platform

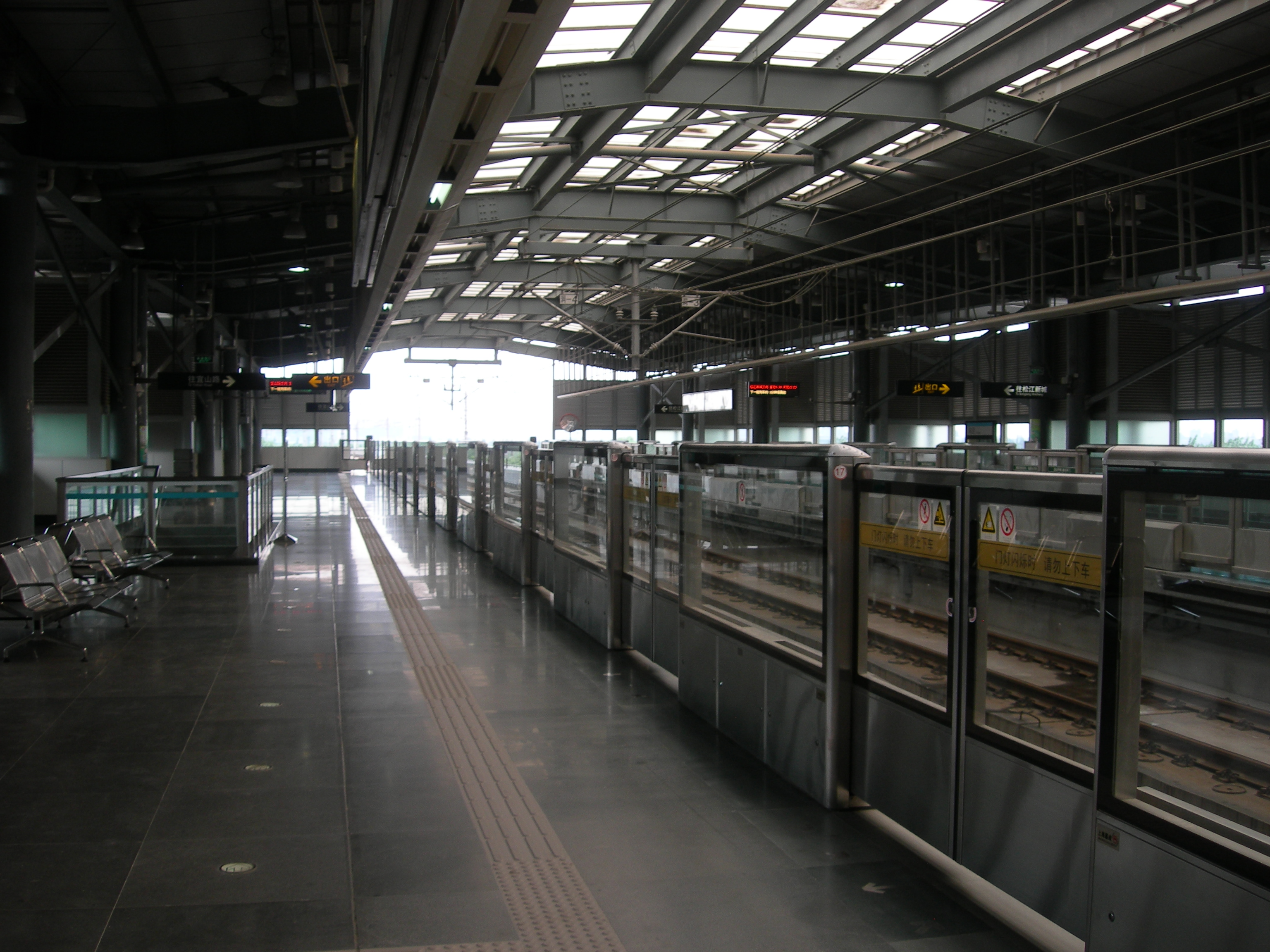
Dongjing station

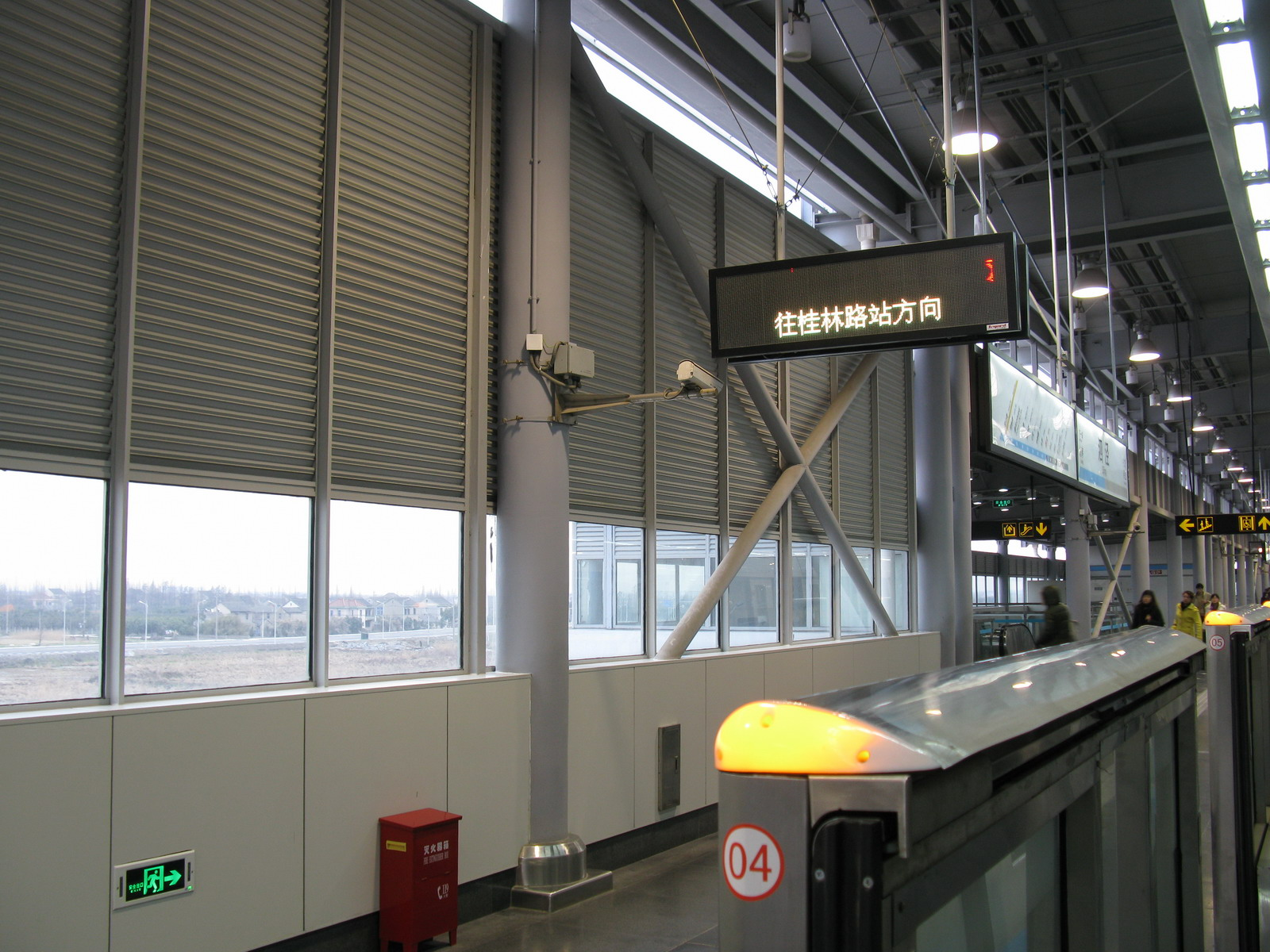
Sijing station

=== Incidents ===
In the early hours of November 7, 2010, at around 1:50 AM, a pressurization incident occurred at Shanghai Jianhua Concrete Pile Co., Ltd., located at 2033 Husong Road. During the pressurization process, a component of the No. 1 autoclave in Workshop A suddenly broke loose. The part crashed through the outer wall and struck the southern pillar of the No. 51 bridge on Metro Line 9. Fortunately, the incident occurred during non-operational hours. However, train services between Jiuting station and Songjiang New Town station had to be temporarily suspended, and trains were limited to a speed of 10 km/h.

On February 23, 2024, at 6:25 AM, operations on the section of Line 9 between Songjiang South Station and Jiuting Station were suspended due to ice accumulation on the overhead contact line. A bus bridging plan was activated, and by 9:37 AM, normal operations resumed. This was the first time that such an issue had occurred on the Shanghai Metro.

On the morning of June 19, 2024, at 8:28 AM, an indiscriminate stabbing incident happened at the Hechuan Road Station on Shanghai Metro Line 9, near the station's exit. The incident occurred during the busy rush hour, when the station was crowded with commuters going about their daily routines. The attacker, seemingly acting without any clear motive, began randomly attacking innocent passengers with a knife, causing chaos among the people in the vicinity. Three people were injured, and the attacker was apprehended by the police. Following the incident, Hechuan Road Station was temporarily closed to allow authorities to manage the situation, and normal operations resumed at 9:16 AM. In the aftermath, the security system of the Shanghai Metro was widely questioned. Some critics expressed concerns, arguing that the existing security measures may not be capable of preventing such a violent act. They pointed out that with millions of passengers using the metro daily, maintaining robust security should be the top priority to safeguard public safety.

On the other hand, others have acknowledged the challenges faced by the metro system in Shanghai, particularly during peak hours. They pointed out that while security is crucial, the sheer volume of commuters makes it difficult to implement thorough checks without causing significant delays. The Shanghai Metro is one of the busiest transit systems in the world, and balancing passenger safety with the need for efficiency is a complex issue. Stringent security measures could slow down operations, particularly during rush hour when the metro is operating at full capacity. This debate highlights the ongoing challenge for large urban transit systems like Shanghai’s Metro.

=== Future expansion ===
The east section is planned to extend one station to Caolu Railway station.

=== Station name change ===
- On 28 October 2006, Dongfang Road was renamed as the Century Avenue after station renovation for line 2 and the opening of line 4 (before line 9 began serving the station).

== Headways ==
Shanghai Metro Line 9 headway
Time		Songjiang South Railway Station - Sheshan	Sheshan - Middle Yanggao Road (PM peak) / Jinji Road (AM peak)	Middle Yanggao Road (PM peak) / Jinji Road (AM peak) - Caolu
Monday - Friday (working days)
AM peak	7:30–9:00	Eastbound: (Note: Eastbound to Sheshan.) Average 3 min 50 sec Westbound: (Note: Westbound to Songjiang South Railway Station.) About 5 min	Eastbound: (Note: Eastbound to Jinji Road.) Average 1 min and 50 sec Westbound: (Note: Westbound to Sheshan.) About 2 min and 30 sec	Eastbound: (Note: Eastbound to Caolu.) About 5 min and 30 sec Westbound: (Note: Westbound to Jinji Road.) About 5 min
Off-peak	9:00–17:00	About 5 min and 30 sec
PM peak	17:00–19:30	Eastbound: About 5 min Westbound: About 4 min and 30 sec	Eastbound: (Note: Eastbound to Middle Yanggao Road.) About 3 min Westbound: About 2 min and 30 sec	Both directions: (Note: Middle Yanggao Road - Caolu.) About 5 min
Other hours	Before 7:30 After 19:30	About 8 - 10 min
Saturday and Sunday (weekends)
Peak	8:00–20:00	About 5 min
Other hours	Before 8:00 After 20:00	About 6 - 10 min
Extended operation (Friday and Saturday) (Note: Extended hours operates between Sheshan and Middle Yanggao Road.)
	After 22:55		15 - 20 minutes

== Technology ==
=== Rolling stock ===
Shanghai Metro Line 9 rolling stock
Fleet numbers	Manufacturer	Time of manufac- turing	Class	No of car	Assembly (Note: Tc: Trailer with cab; Mp: EMU with pantograph; M: EMU without pantograph.)	Rolling stock	Number	Notes
60	Bombardier Movia 456	2004–2005	A (Note: Class A carriage: 21-24m in length, 3.0m in width and 3.8m in height; Capacity: about 310 people.)	6	Tc+Mp+M+M+Mp+Tc	09A01	0901-0910 (090011-090601)	Seconded from line 1. Original name: AC04.; former number 011751-012341.
246	Bombardier Movia 456	2008–2010	A	6	Tc+Mp+M+M+Mp+Tc	09A02	0911-0951 (090611-093061)	5 trains (numbers 0942–0945, 0948) used on the Expo line (trainset number 1301-1305) for the World Expo in 2010, returned to line 9 afterwards. Original name: AC09. Same as 07A01 and 12A01 (but different painting).
216	Bombardier Movia 456	2016–2018	A	6	Tc+Mp+M+M+Mp+Tc	09A03	0953-0988 (093131-095281)	Same as 07A02 (but different painting).
102	CRRC Changchun Railway Vehicles Co., Ltd.	2018–2020	A	6	Tc+Mp+M+M+Mp+Tc	09A04	09089-09105 (095291-096301)

=== Former rolling stock ===
Shanghai Metro Line 9 former rolling stock
Fleet numbers	Manufacturer	Time of manufac- turing	Class	No of car	Assembly	Rolling stock	Number	Notes
6	Shanghai Electric	2007	A	6	Tc+Mp+M+M+Mp+Tc	09ASY	0952 (093071-093121)	On 20 December 2011, it was reassigned to be a special training vehicle.

One train (0952) manufactured in 2007 was mainly debugged for experimental purposes. It began trial operation with passengers on April 25, 2009, and will no longer be operational in 2010. On December 20, 2011, the vehicle was retired from line 9 and became a special training vehicle. It was transferred to the original Zhangjiang Hi-Tech Park of line 2 to the newly built Longyang Road training line for subway staff training.

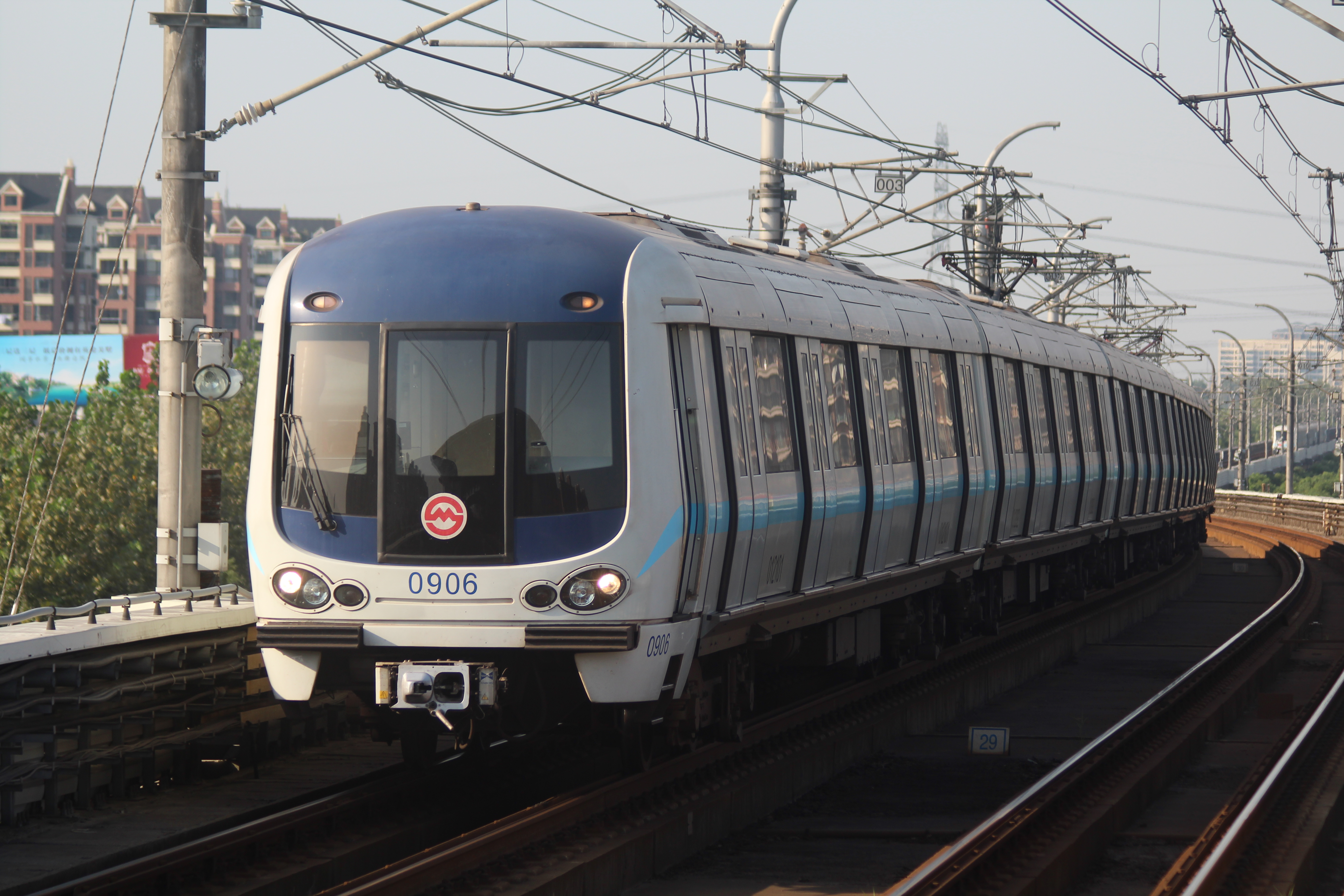
09A01 train

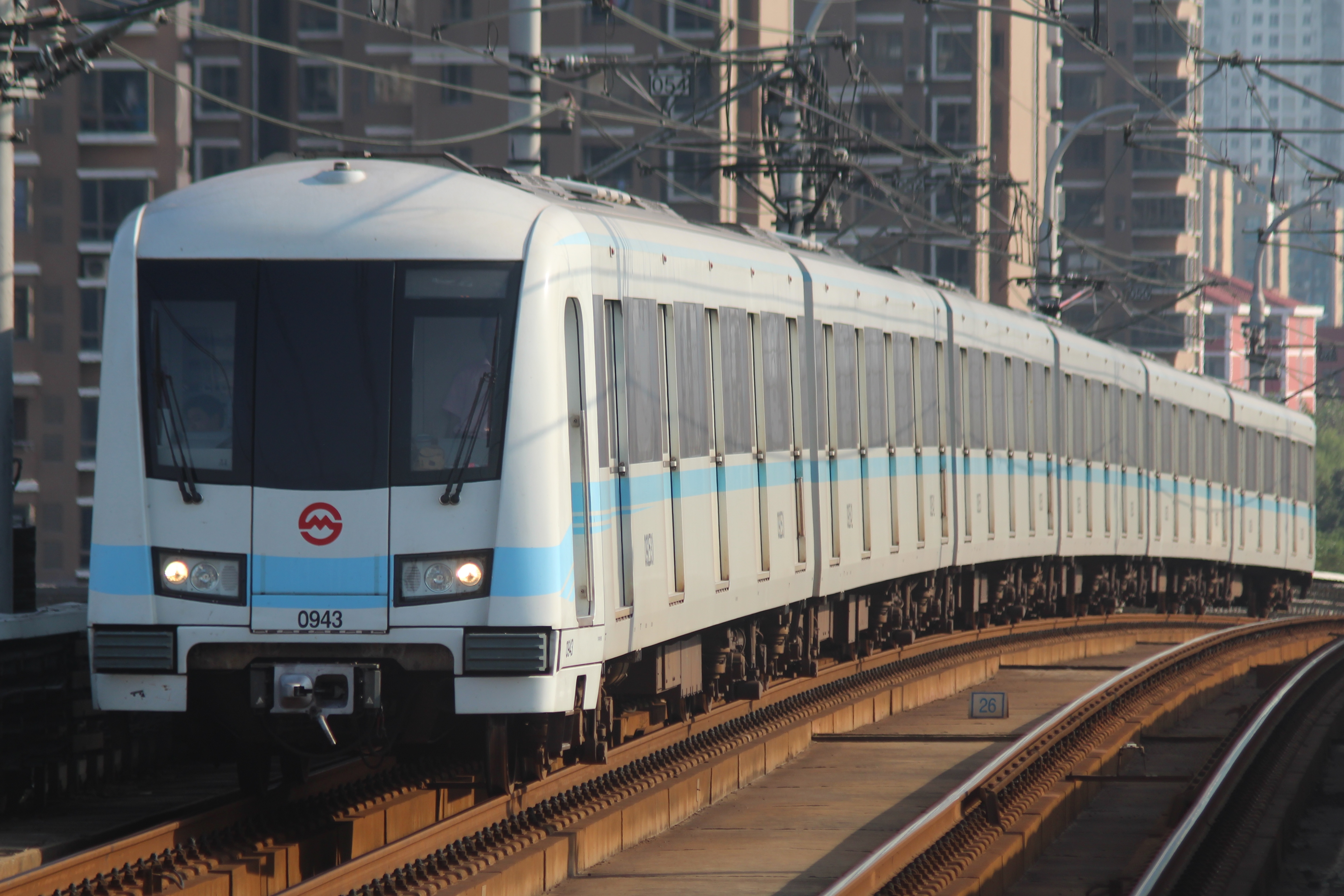
09A02 train

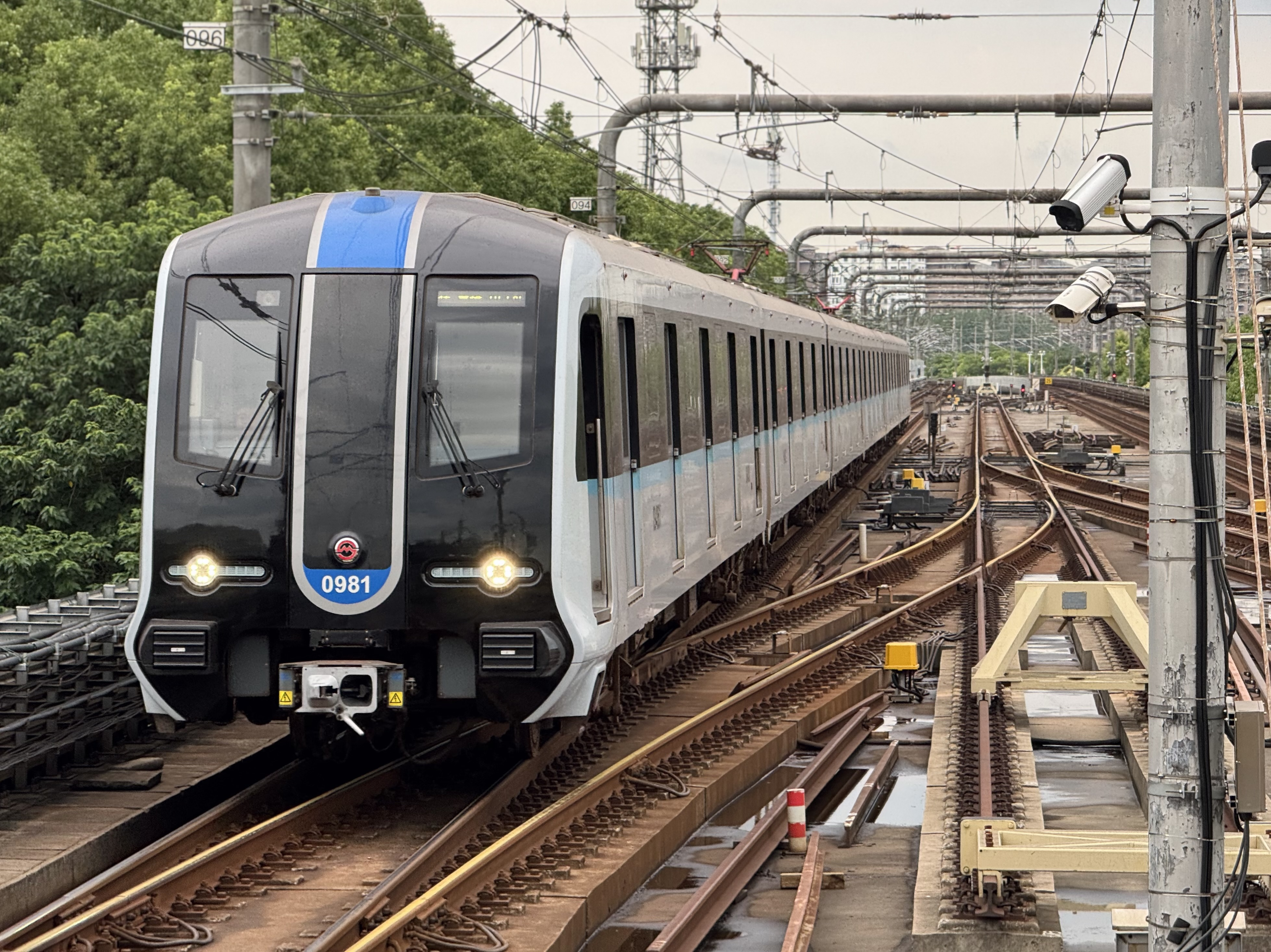
09A03 train

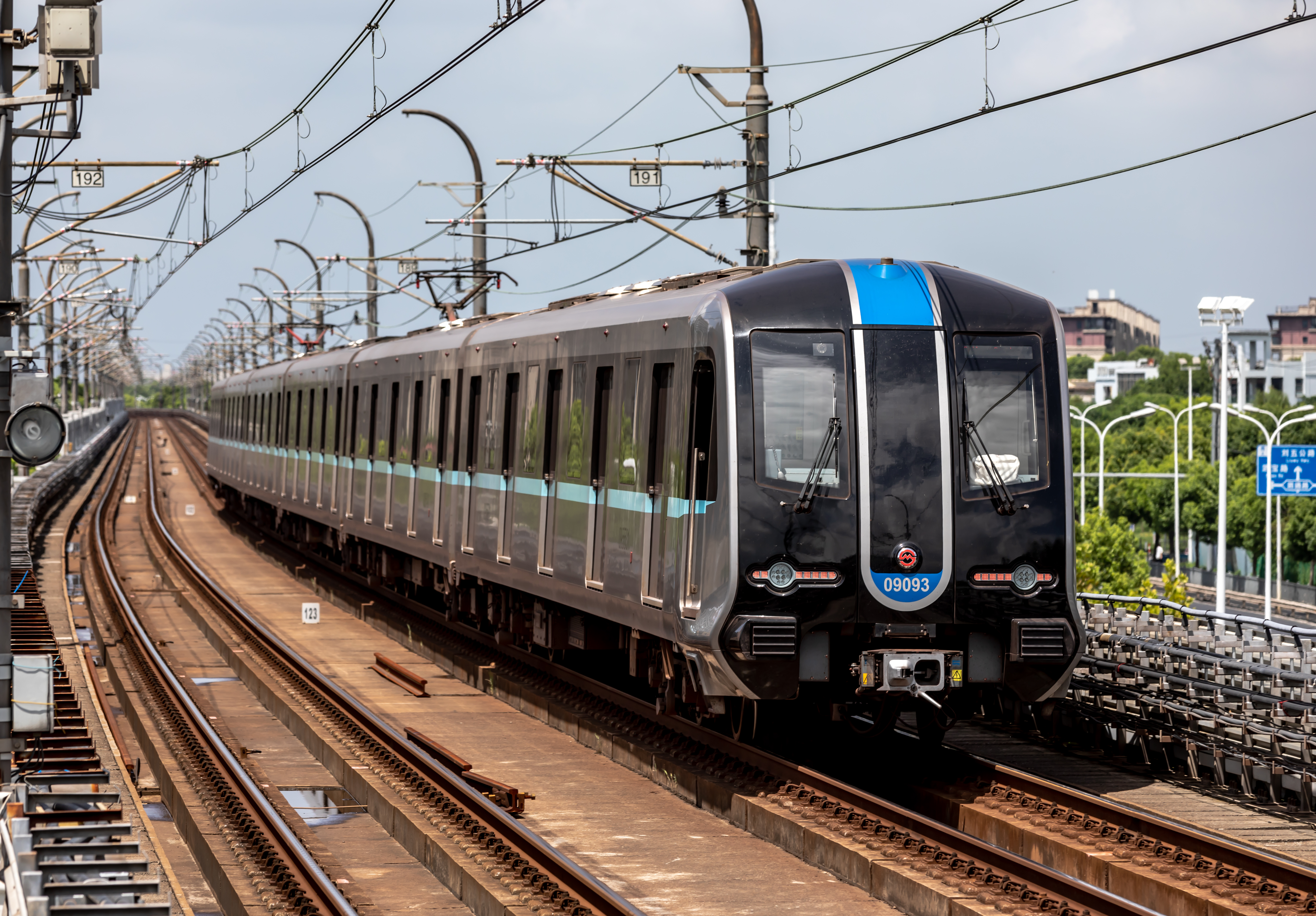
09A04 train

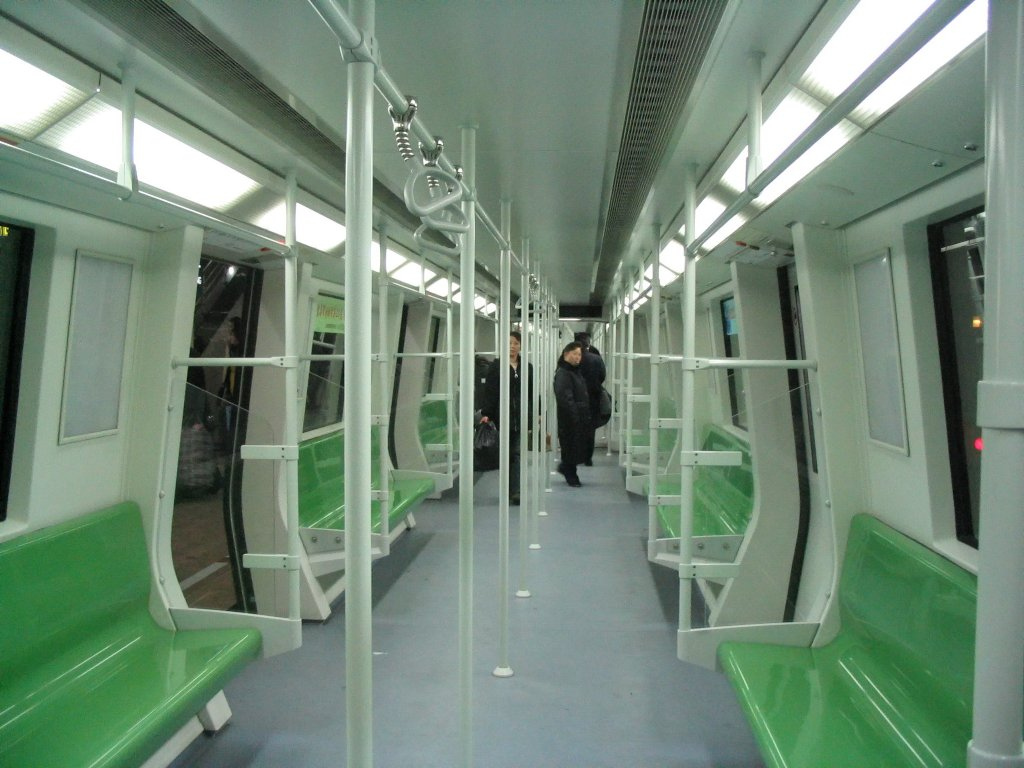
Interior of line 9 AC04 series train
