= Dongmen Road =

Road in Shanghai, China

Dongmen Road (東門路) is a road in Shanghai, China. It extends in the west from the site of the old East Gate of Shanghai on Zhonghua Road, part of the ring road surrounding the Old City of Shanghai, to South Zhongshan Road and the Huangpu River in the east, an arterial road and part of the quasi-ring road Zhongshan Road. Administratively, it is in Huangpu District.

== History ==
Dongmen Road is a street with a long history. "Dongmen" means "east gate". In the end of the Ming Dynasty, around 1700, when Shanghai became a small city for the first time, this street came to exist. The wall of the old city was built as a circle, totally on the west side of the Huangpu River. There are six gates to the outside—one north gate, one west gate, two south gates and two east gates. Among them, the east gate located on the west end of the Dongmen Street was the most important one in the old city.

Furthermore, at that time, river transportation was served as the most regular way to make purchase with other cities. The biggest dock in Shanghai, called Shiliupu, is near this east gate. So, the Dongmen Road which connected the East Gate and the Shiliupu dock is surely to be the main street of old Shanghai, with shops alongside, goods in and out, and traffic across frequently.

The wall and all the gates including the East Gate were destroyed around 1920 to make the traffic in and out more conveniently. And nowadays, The Shiliupu dock is no longer for transportation use but only for trip of the Huangu River instead. Dongmen Street, as a result, becomes a normal street of 20 meter wide, carrying four drives side by side. Shops are not as many as before. However, Dongmen Road is not far from Yuyuan Garden, an elaborate traditional garden in the Jiangnan style, and one of the tourist sites of Shanghai. As a result, the north side of the street now serves as a parking center where many tourist buses park.

== Recently ==
Recently, the government has realized the special means of the historic street, and they are trying to build a huge shopping mall with active surface to make the prosperity of the blocks alongside reappear after hundreds of years. Actually, now, a residential community has been already built on the south side with commercial on the first and second floor.
