= Caolu station =

Shanghai Metro station

Caolu 曹路
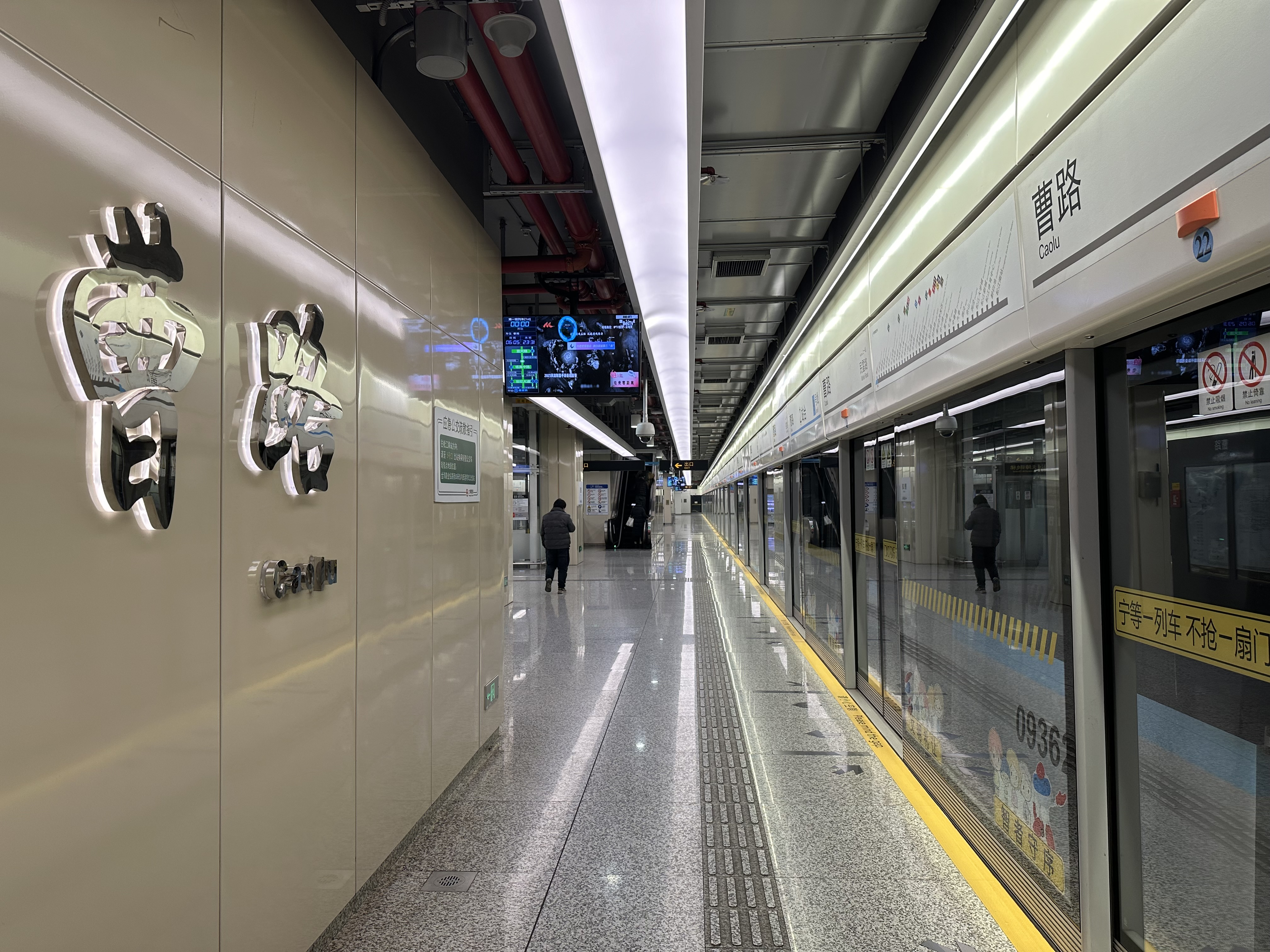
- Station platform

General information
- Location: Jinhai Road (金海路) and Jinzuan Road (金钻路); Caolu, Pudong New Area, Shanghai; China
- Coordinates: 31.273402°N 121.678670°E
- Operator: Shanghai No. 1 Metro Operation Co. Ltd.
- Line: Line 9
- Platforms: 2 (1 island platform)
- Tracks: 2

Construction
- Structure type: Underground
- Accessible: Yes

History
- Opened: December 30, 2017

Services
Preceding station	Shanghai Metro	Following station
Minlei Road towards Shanghai Songjiang Railway Station	Line 9	Terminus
Location
- Location within Shanghai

Caolu (Chinese: 曹路; pinyin: Cáolù) is a station on Line 9 of the Shanghai Metro. Located at the intersection of Jinhai Road and Jinzuan Road, it is the eastern terminus of the line. It began passenger trial operations with the rest of phase 3 of Line 9, an easterly extension with 9 new stations, on December 30, 2017.
