= Shanghai Songjiang Railway Station metro station =

Shanghai Metro station

Shanghai Songjiang Railway Station 上海松江站
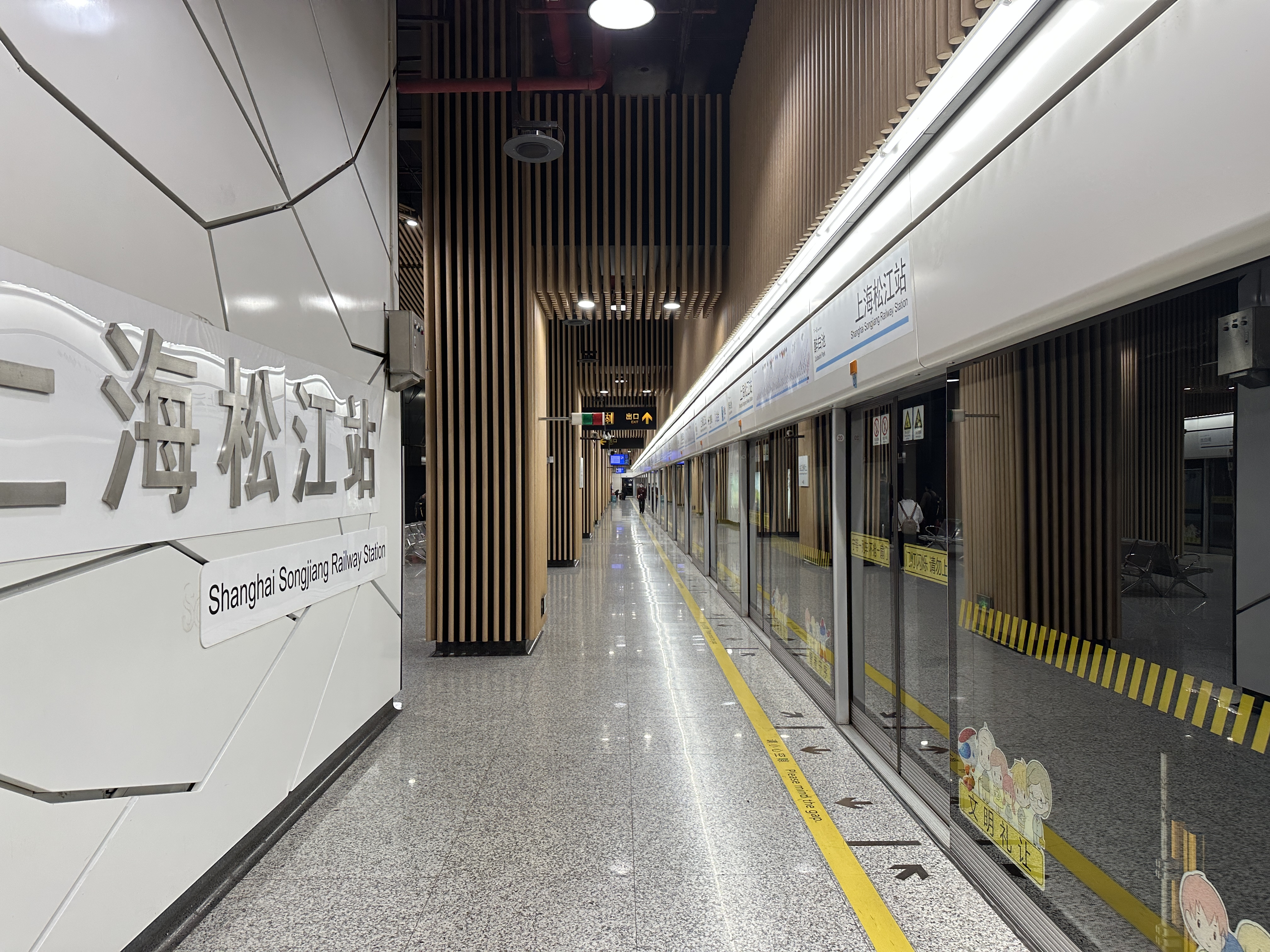
- Station platform

General information
- Other names: Songjiang South Railway Station (松江南站) (before 21 September 2024)
- Location: Shanghai Songjiang railway station Songjiang District, Shanghai; China
- Coordinates: 30.986935°N 121.226362°E
- Operator: Shanghai No. 1 Metro Operation Co. Ltd.
- Line: Line 9
- Platforms: 2 (1 island platform)
- Tracks: 2
- Connections: Shanghai Songjiang railway station (IMH)

Construction
- Structure type: Underground
- Accessible: Yes

History
- Opened: 30 December 2012

Services
Preceding station	Shanghai Metro	Following station
Terminus	Line 9	Zuibaichi Park towards Caolu
Location
- Location within Shanghai

Shanghai Songjiang Railway Station (Chinese: 上海松江站; pinyin: Shànghǎi Sōngjiāngzhàn) is a metro station on Line 9 of the Shanghai Metro, and also serves as the line's southern terminus. It began operation on 30 December 2012. It is adjacent to Shanghai Songjiang railway station. Formerly Songjiang South Railway Station (Chinese: 松江南站; pinyin: Sōngjiāng Nánzhàn), it was renamed to the current name in September 2024.

== Station layout ==
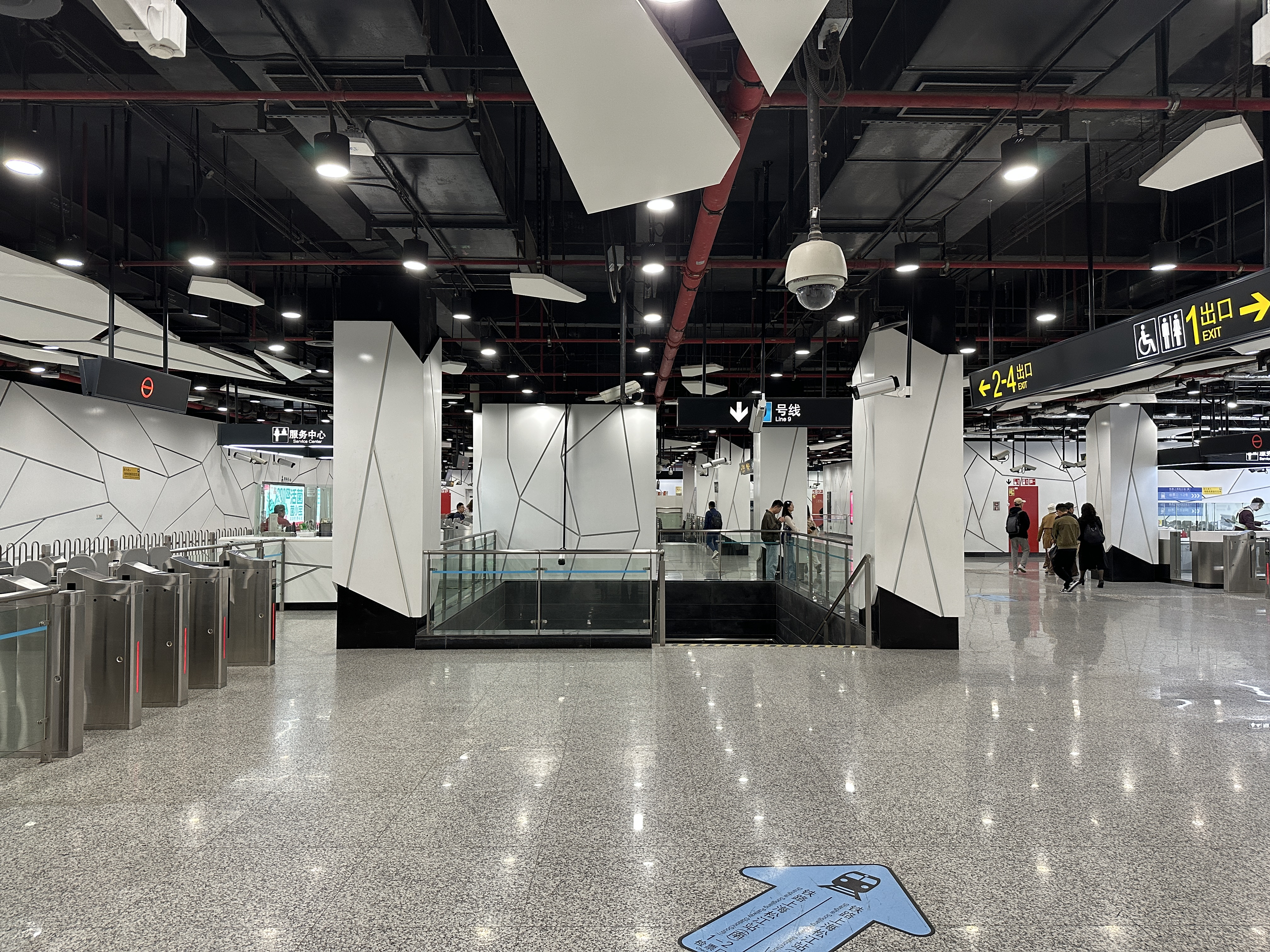
Concourse

Shanghai Songjiang Railway Station metro station has two levels: a concourse, and an island platform with two tracks for Line 9.

== Entrances/exits ==
- 1: Songli Road
- 2: Songli Road
- 3: Shanghai Songjiang railway station
- 4: Shanghai Songjiang railway station
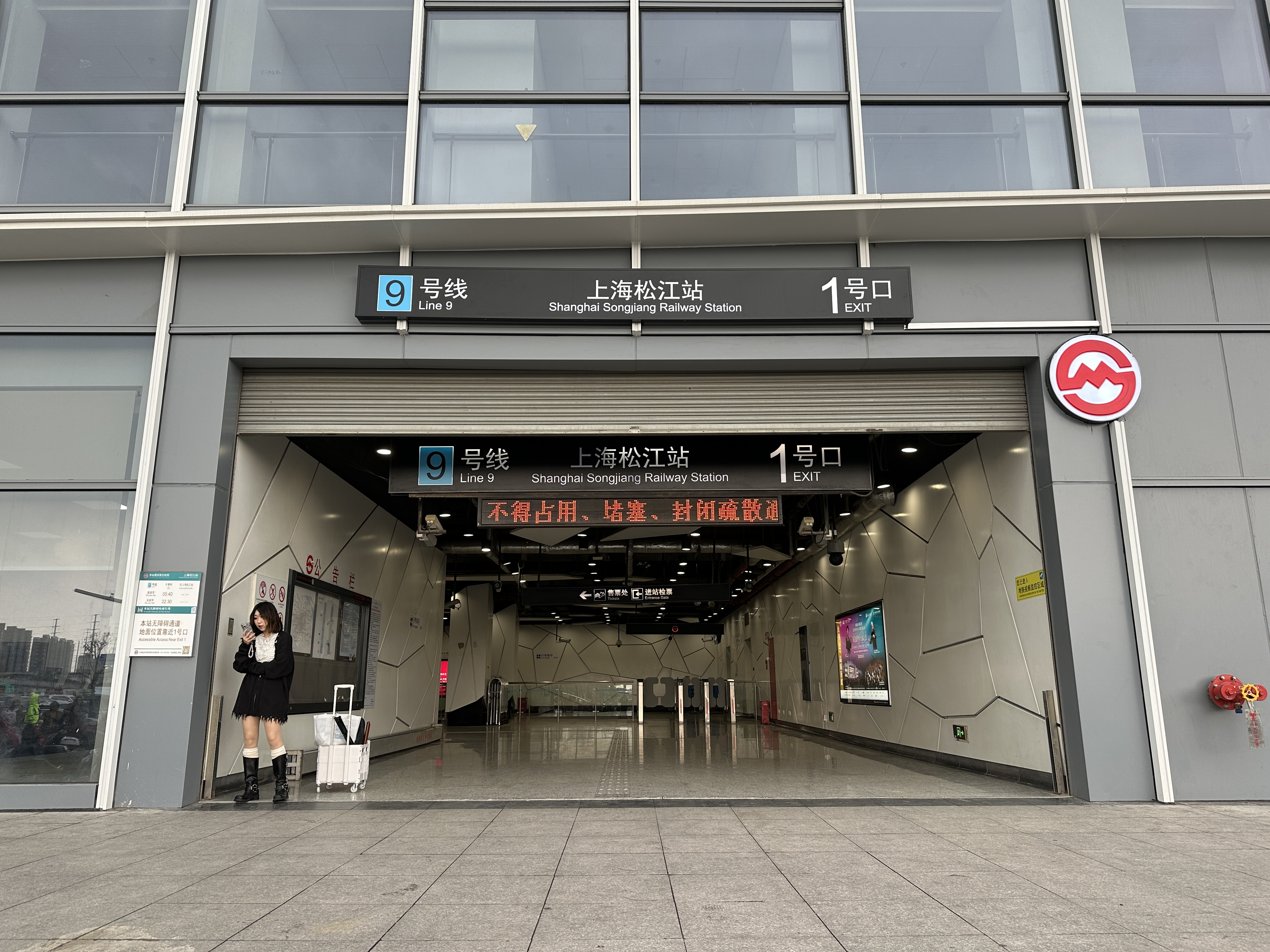
Exit 1

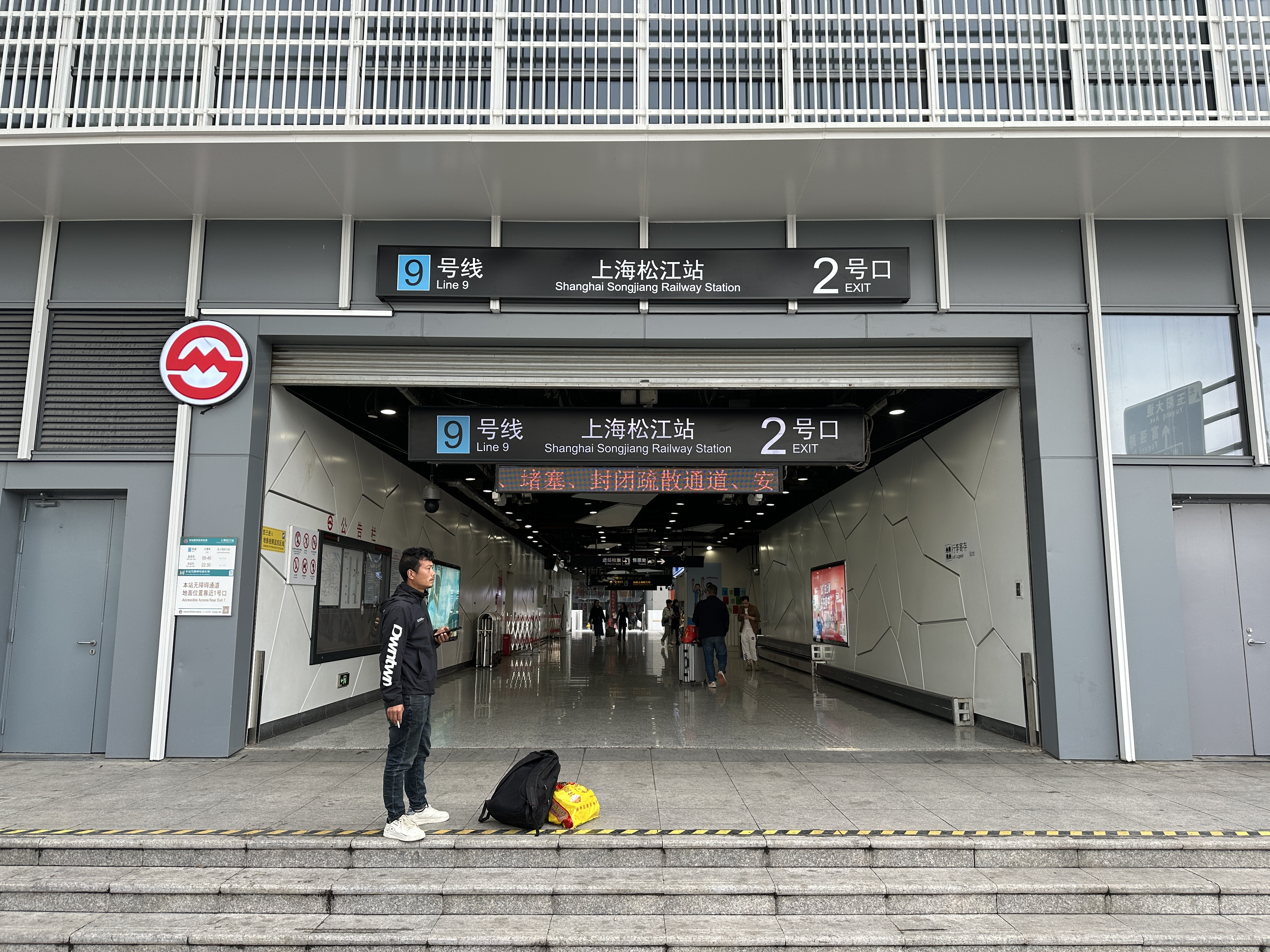
Exit 2

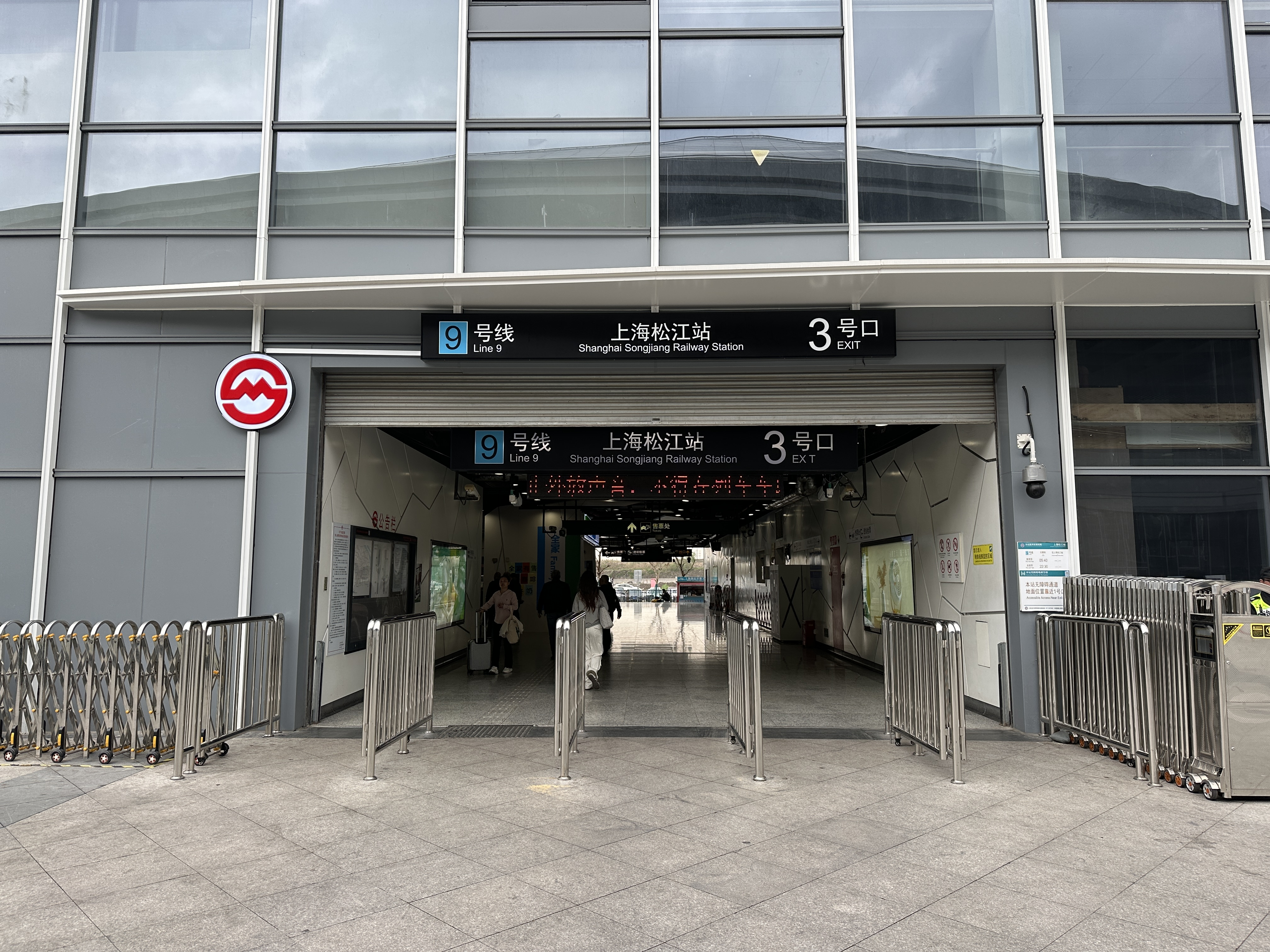
Exit 3

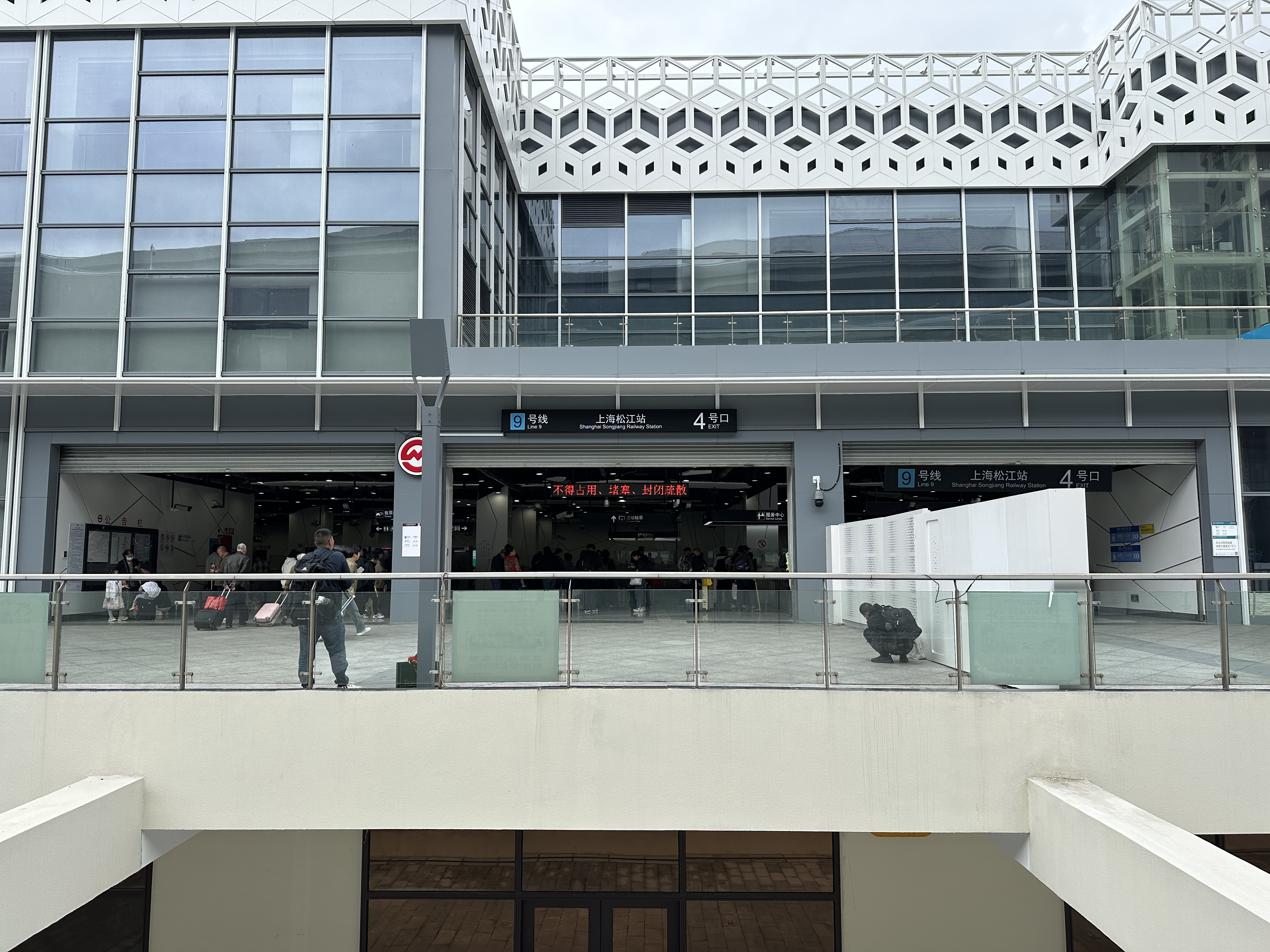
Exit 4
