= Jiangsu Road =

Jiangsu Road may refer to:

- Jiangsu Road station
- Jiangsu Road (Lhasa)
- Monument of Jiangsu Road

== See also ==
- Jiangsu
