= Jiangsu Road (Lhasa) =

Road in Lhasa, Tibet, China

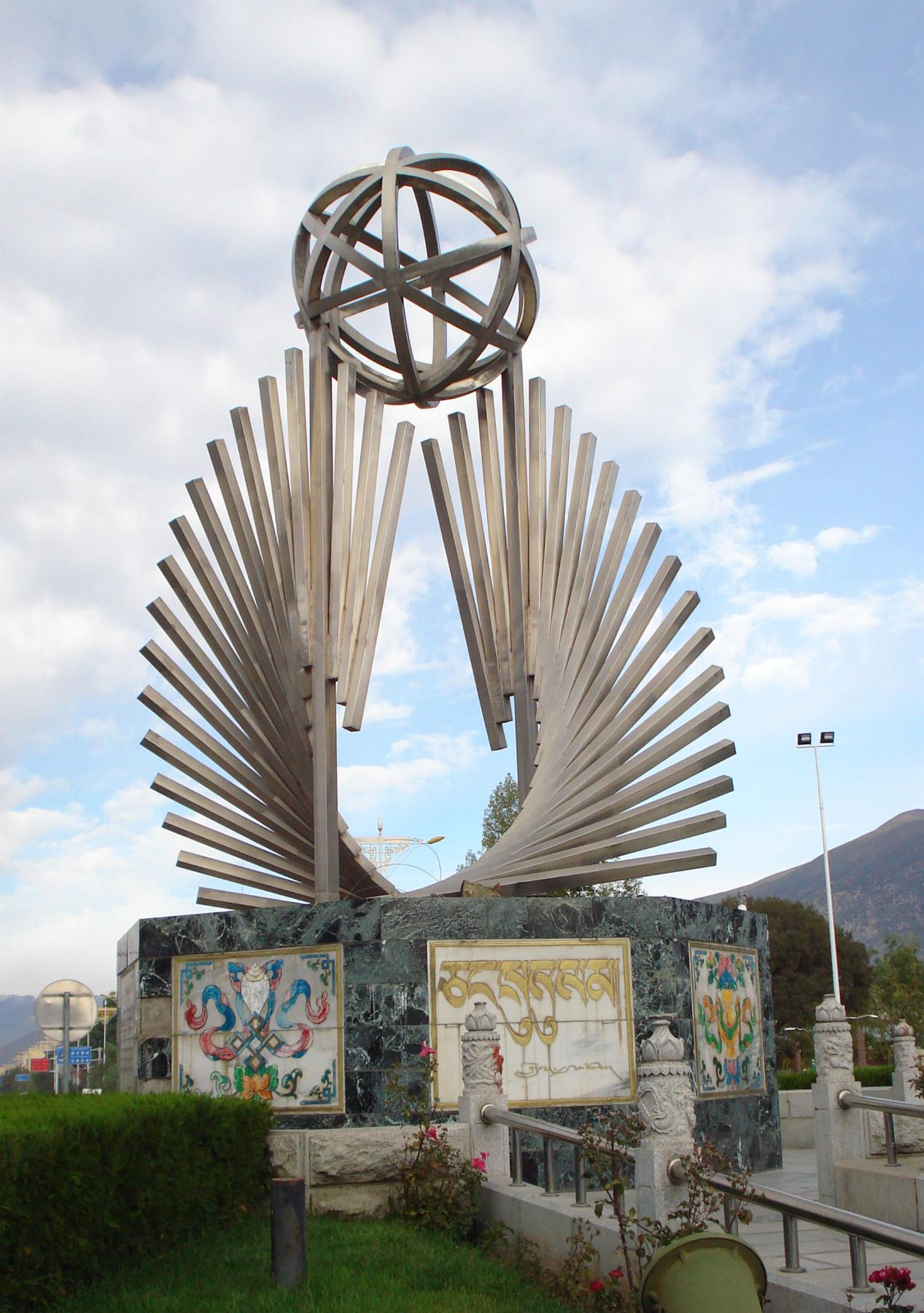
Jiangsu Road Monument

Jiangsu Road (Chinese: 江苏路), is an east–west road in Lhasa, Tibet Autonomous Region, China.

== History ==
The road was originally named "Jinzhu Road" because the People's Liberation Army (PLA) Tibet Military Compound was located on the road (the PLA is called "Jinzhu Mami" in Tibetan). On August 27, 1997, the road was renovated with the assistance of Jiangsu Province. After the completion of the road was renamed "Jiangsu Road", and set up a Monument of Jiangsu Road to commemorate the contribution of Jiangsu Province's reconstruction assistance.
