= List of Shanghai Metro stations =

Shanghai Metro system map as of 22 September 2024

This article lists the stations of the Shanghai Metro, a rapid transit system serving Shanghai, China and one of the fastest-growing metro systems in the world. The first section opened in 1993, and the system currently has 808 kilometres (502 mi) of track in operation, making it one of the world's largest rapid transit system by route length and second largest by number of stations.

The tables below contain the 515 stations on the Shanghai Metro operational as of December 2021 (506 counting interchanges between different lines separately, with the exception of the 9 stations shared by lines 3 and 4 on the same track) of which there are 415 unique stations (counting interchange stations as one station). The stations on the Shanghai maglev train and Jinshan railway are not included, as they use a fare system separate from and are not considered part of the Shanghai Metro network.

== Line 1 ==
Service Routes		Station Name		Opened	Location	Platform Level	Type of Platform	Transfers
Service Routes		English	Chinese (S)	Opened	Location	Platform Level	Type of Platform	Transfers
●	●	Xinzhuang	莘庄	28 December 1996	Minhang	At-grade	Side platform	5 Jinshan; Xinzhuang
●	●	Waihuanlu	外环路	28 December 1996	Minhang	At-grade	Side platform	
●	●	Lianhua Road	莲花路	28 December 1996	Minhang	At-grade	Side platform	
●	●	Jinjiang Park	锦江乐园	28 May 1993 (former); 12 December 1996 (current)	Xuhui	At-grade	Side platform	
●	●	Shanghai South Railway Station	上海南站	28 May 1993 (former); 30 October 2004 (current)	Xuhui	Underground	Island platform	3 15 Jinshan (Note: Out of system transfer with Jinshan railway.); Shanghainan (Note: Out of system transfer with this station, operated by China Railway.)
●	●	Caobao Road	漕宝路	28 May 1993	Xuhui	Underground	Island platform	12
●	●	Shanghai Indoor Stadium	上海体育馆	28 May 1993	Xuhui	Underground	Island platform	4
●	●	Xujiahui	徐家汇	28 May 1993	Xuhui	Underground	Island platform	9 11
●	●	Hengshan Road	衡山路	10 April 1995	Xuhui	Underground	Island platform	
●	●	Changshu Road	常熟路	10 April 1995	Xuhui	Underground	Island platform	7
●	●	South Shaanxi Road	陕西南路	10 April 1995	Huangpu	Underground	Island platform	10 12
●	●	Site of the First CPC National Congress · South Huangpi Road	一大会址·黄陂南路	10 April 1995	Huangpu	Underground	Island platform	14
●	●	People's Square	人民广场	10 April 1995	Huangpu	Underground	Island platform	2 8
●	●	Xinzha Road	新闸路	10 April 1995	Huangpu	Underground	Island platform	
●	●	Hanzhong Road	汉中路	10 April 1995	Jing'an	Underground	Island platform	12 13
●	●	Shanghai Railway Station	上海火车站	10 April 1995	Jing'an	Underground	Island platform	3 4 (Note: Virtual transfer – passengers who hold the Shanghai Public Transportation Card and transfer within 30 minutes of exiting the station are able to transfer to other lines without exiting the system.); Shanghai
●		North Zhongshan Road	中山北路	28 December 2004	Jing'an	Underground	Island platform	
●		Yanchang Road	延长路	28 December 2004	Jing'an	Underground	Island platform	
●		Shanghai Circus World	上海马戏城	28 December 2004	Jing'an	Underground	Island platform	
●		Wenshui Road	汶水路	28 December 2004	Jing'an	Elevated	Side platform	
●		Pengpu Xincun	彭浦新村	28 December 2004	Jing'an	Elevated	Side platform	
●		Gongkang Road	共康路	28 December 2004	Jing'an	Elevated	Side platform	
●		Tonghe Xincun	通河新村	28 December 2004	Baoshan	Elevated	Side platform	
●		Hulan Road	呼兰路	28 December 2004	Baoshan	Elevated	Side platform	18
●		Gongfu Xincun	共富新村	28 December 2004	Baoshan	Elevated	Side platform	
●		Bao'an Highway	宝安公路	29 December 2007	Baoshan	Elevated	Side platform	
●		West Youyi Road	友谊西路	29 December 2007	Baoshan	Elevated	Side platform	
●		Fujin Road	富锦路	29 December 2007	Baoshan	Elevated	One side platform and one island platform	

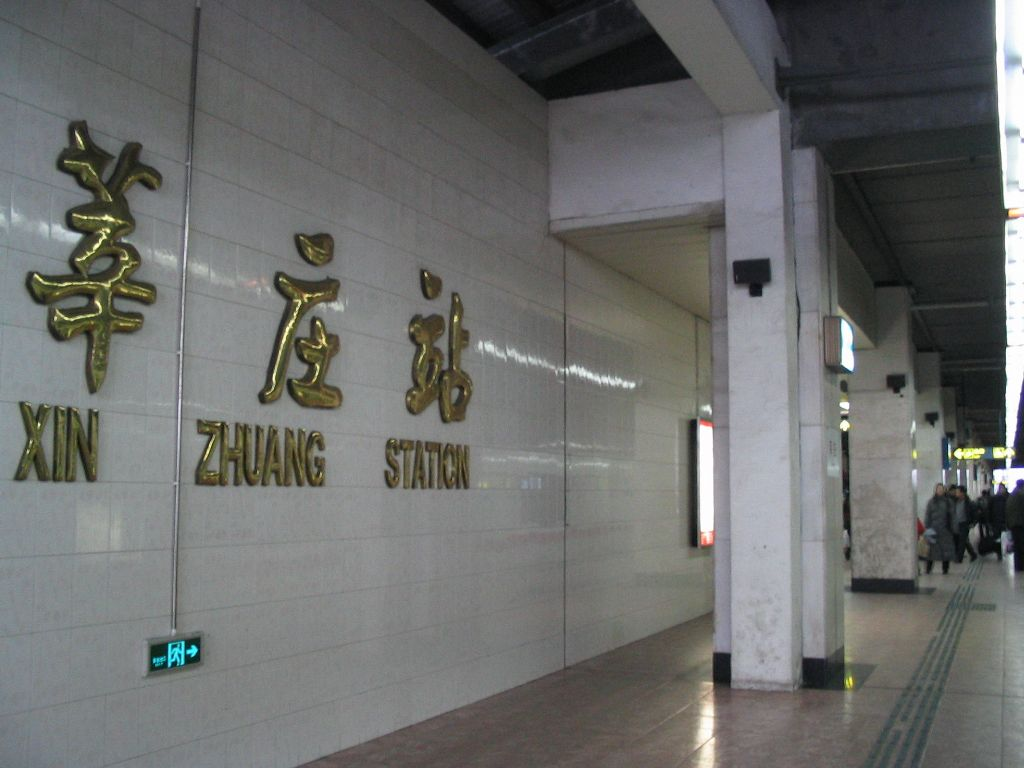
Line 1 platform of Xinzhuang

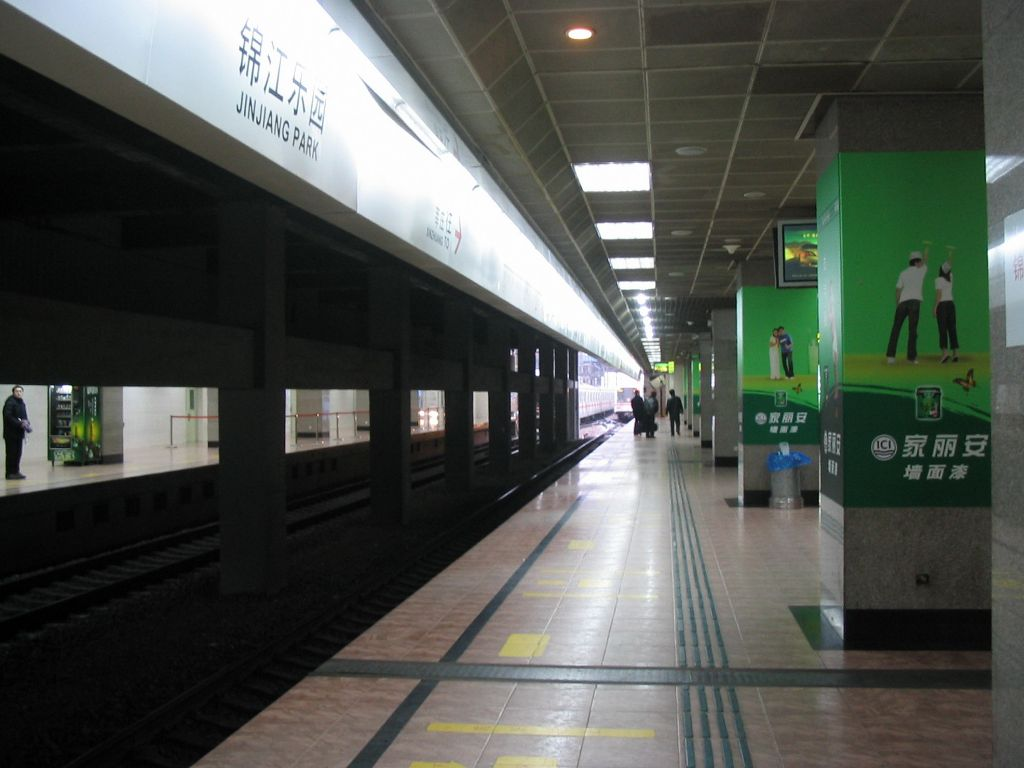
Line 1 platform of Jinjiang Park

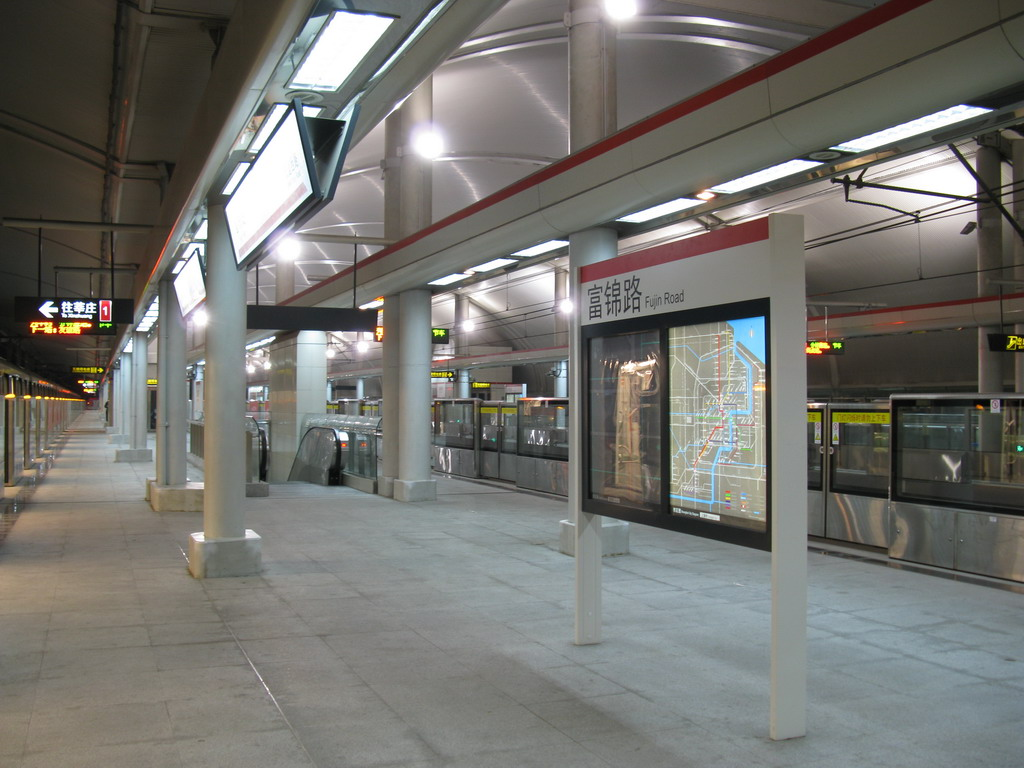
Line 1 platform of Fujin Road

== Line 2 ==
Service Routes			Station Name		Opened	Location	Platform Level	Type of Platform	Transfers
Mainline	Partial		English	Chinese (S)	Opened	Location	Platform Level	Type of Platform	Transfers
●			Panxiang Road · Shanghai National Accounting Institute	蟠祥路·国家会计学院	1 November 2025	Qingpu	Underground	Island platform	
●	●		National Exhibition and Convention Center	国家会展中心	16 March 2010	Qingpu	Underground	Island platform	17
●	●		Hongqiao Railway Station	虹桥火车站	1 July 2010	Minhang	Underground	Double island platform (shared with Line 17)	10 17; Airport Link; Hongqiao
●	●		Hongqiao Airport Terminal 2	虹桥2号航站楼	16 March 2010	Minhang	Underground	Triple island platform	10 (Note: Virtual transfer from and to National Exhibition and Convention Center-bound trains only – passengers who hold the Shanghai Public Transportation Card and transfer within 30 minutes of exiting the station are able to transfer to other lines without exiting the system.); Airport Link
●	●	●	Songhong Road	淞虹路	30 December 2006	Changning	Underground	Island platform	
●	●	●	Beixinjing	北新泾	30 December 2006	Changning	Underground	Island platform	
●	●	●	Weining Road	威宁路	30 December 2006	Changning	Underground	Island platform	
●	●	●	Loushanguan Road	娄山关路	30 December 2006	Changning	Underground	Island platform	15
●	●	●	Zhongshan Park	中山公园	20 September 1999	Changning	Underground	Island platform	3 4
●	●	●	Jiangsu Road	江苏路	20 September 1999	Changning	Underground	Island platform	11
●	●	●	Jing'an Temple	静安寺	20 September 1999	Jing'an	Underground	Island platform	7 14
●	●	●	West Nanjing Road	南京西路	20 September 1999	Jing'an	Underground	Island platform	12 13
●	●	●	People's Square	人民广场	20 September 1999	Huangpu	Underground	Island platform	1 8
●	●	●	East Nanjing Road	南京东路	20 September 1999	Huangpu	Underground	Island platform	10
●	●	●	Lujiazui	陆家嘴	20 September 1999	Pudong	Underground	Island platform	14
●	●	●	South Pudong Road	浦东南路	20 September 1999	Pudong	Underground	Island platform	14
●	●	●	Century Avenue	世纪大道	20 September 1999	Pudong	Underground	Island platform	4 6 9
●	●	●	Shanghai Science and Technology Museum	上海科技馆	20 September 1999	Pudong	Underground	Island platform	
●	●	●	Century Park	世纪公园	20 September 1999	Pudong	Underground	Island platform	
●	●	●	Longyang Road	龙阳路	20 September 1999	Pudong	Underground	Island platform	7 16 18; Maglev (Note: Out of system transfer with Shanghai Maglev Train.)
●	●	●	Zhangjiang High Technology Park	张江高科	26 December 2000 - 14 February 2010 (former); 24 February 2010 (current)	Pudong	Underground	Island platform	
●	●	●	Jinke Road	金科路	24 February 2010	Pudong	Underground	Island platform	
●	●	●	Guanglan Road	广兰路	24 February 2010	Pudong	Underground	One side platform and one island platform	
●			Tangzhen	唐镇	8 April 2010	Pudong	Underground	Island platform	
●			Middle Chuangxin Road	创新中路	8 April 2010	Pudong	Underground	Side platform	
●			East Huaxia Road	华夏东路	8 April 2010	Pudong	Underground	Side platform	
●			Chuansha	川沙	8 April 2010	Pudong	Underground	Side platform	
●			Lingkong Road	凌空路	8 April 2010	Pudong	Underground	Side platform	
●			Yuandong Avenue	远东大道	8 April 2010	Pudong	Elevated	Island platform	
●			Haitiansan Road	海天三路	8 April 2010	Pudong	Elevated	Island platform	
●			Pudong Airport Terminal 1&2	浦东1号2号航站楼	8 April 2010	Pudong	At-grade	Side platform	Maglev Airport Link

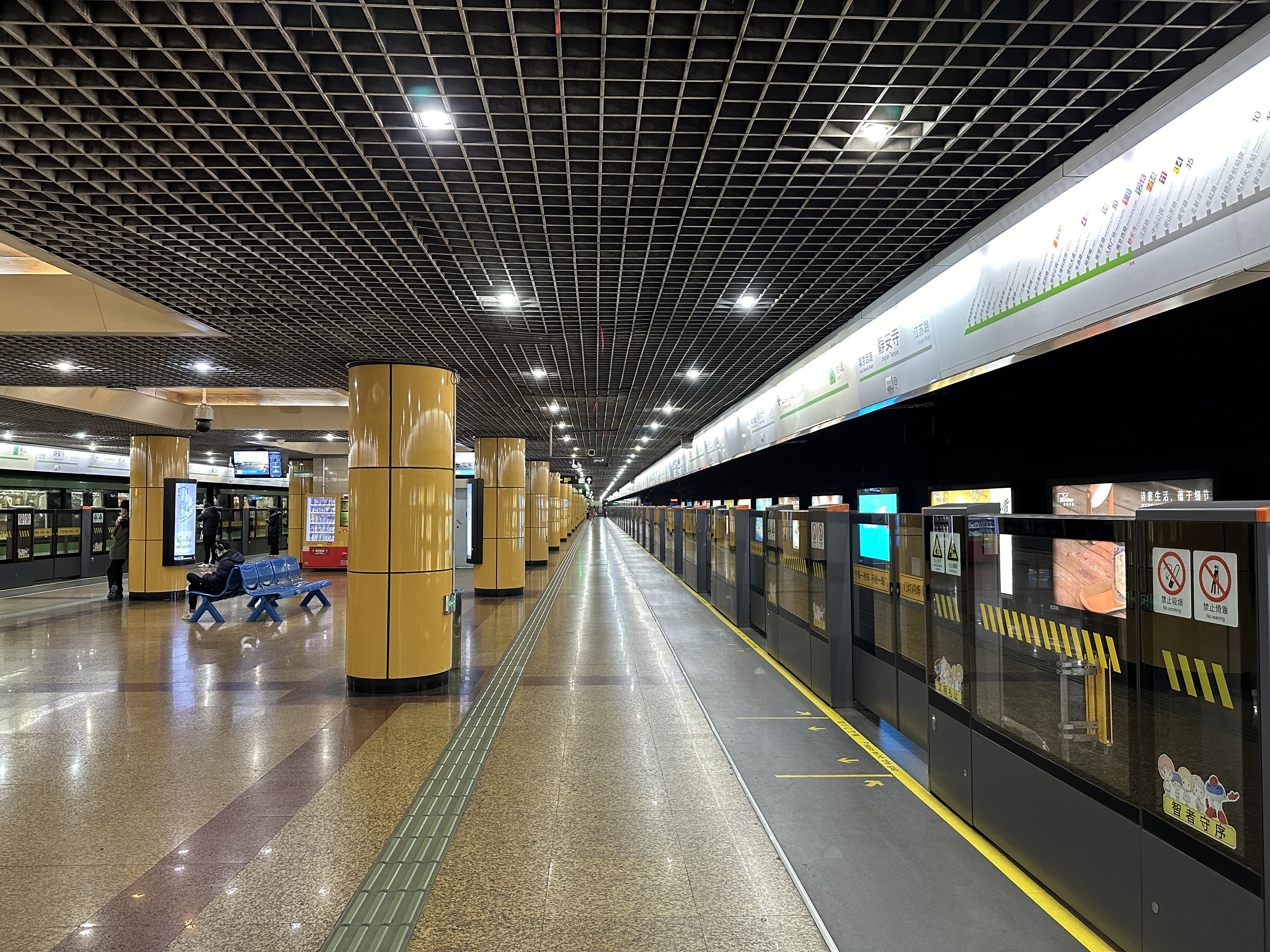
Line 2 platform of Jing'an Temple

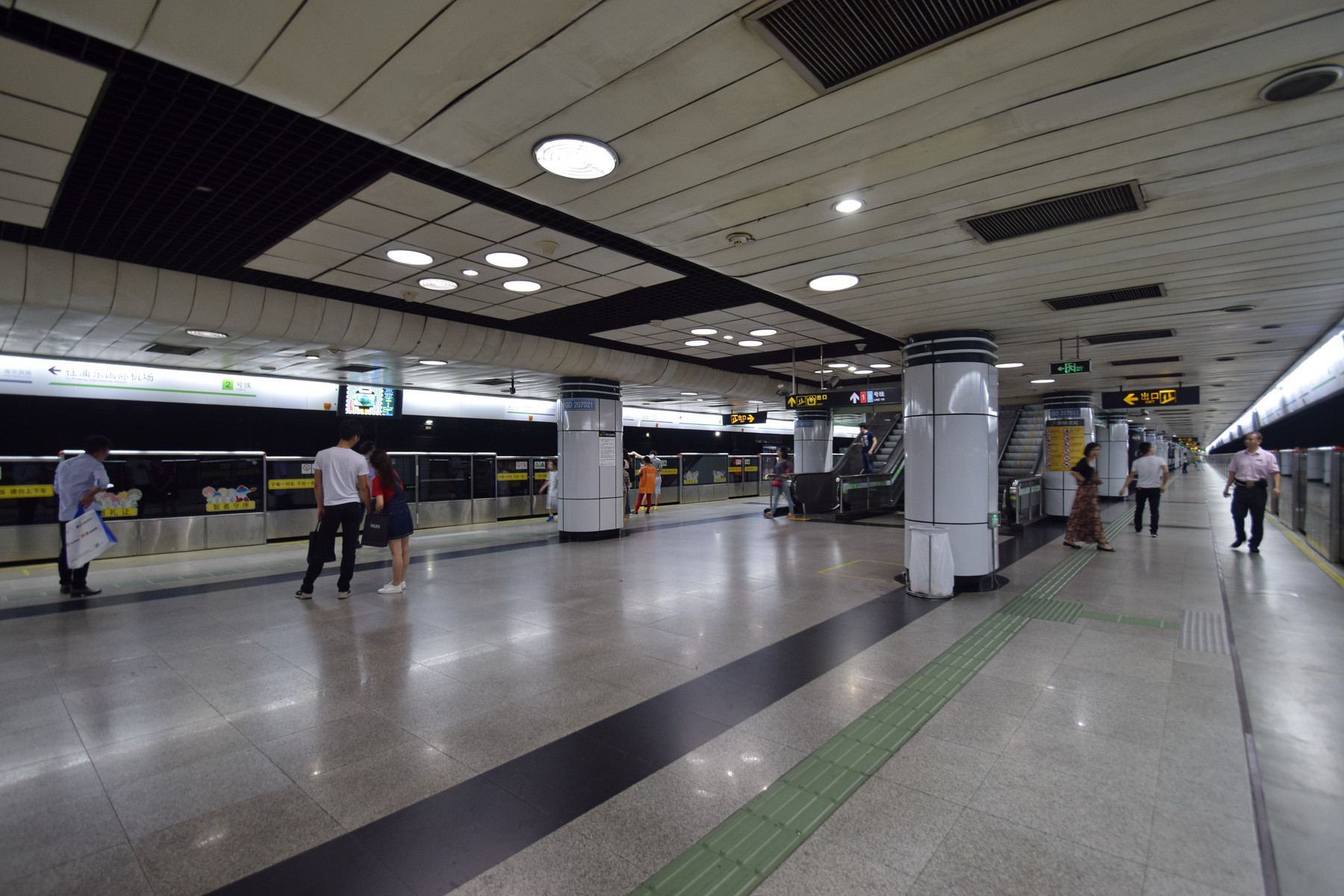
Line 2 platform of People's Square

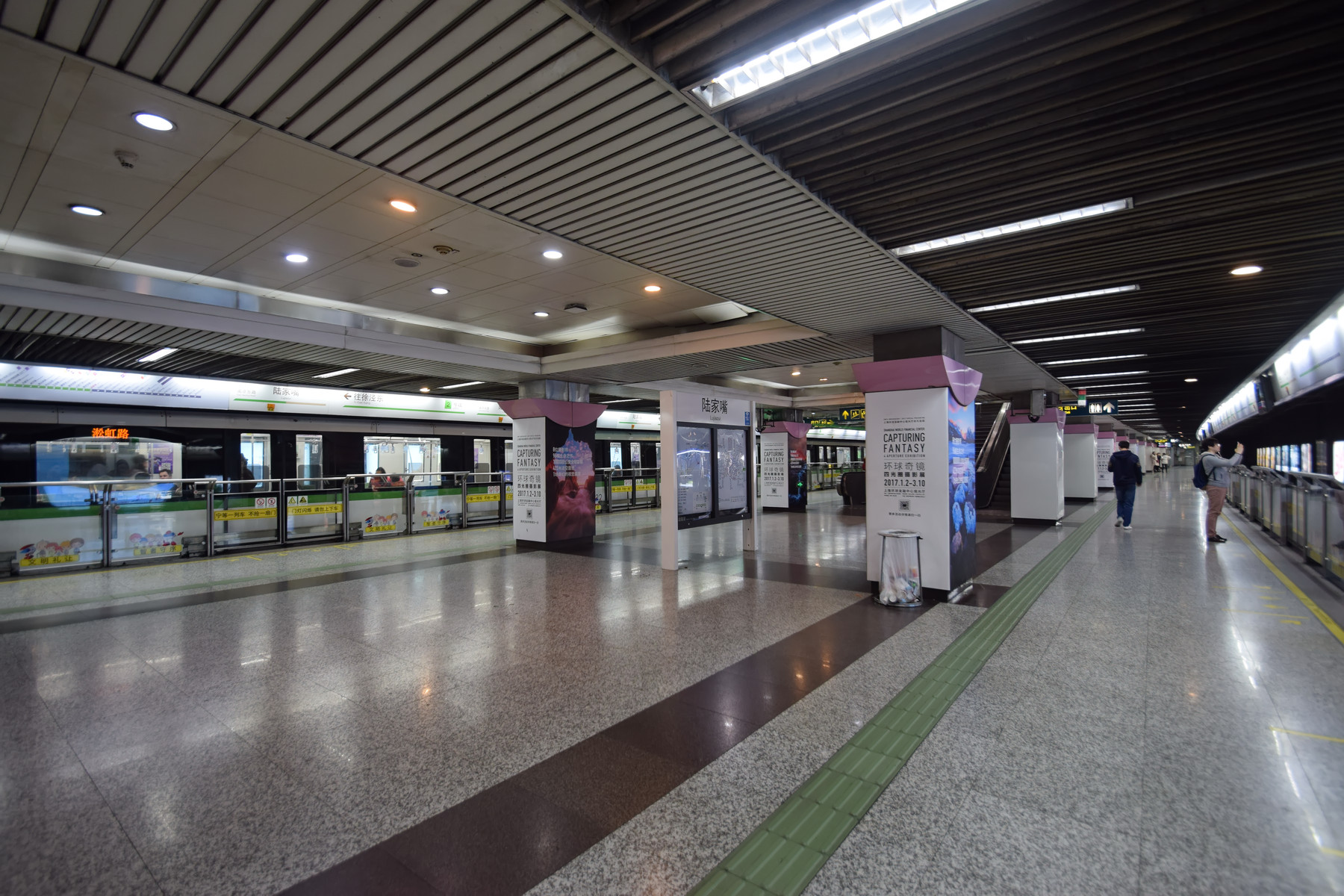
Line 2 platform of Lujiazui

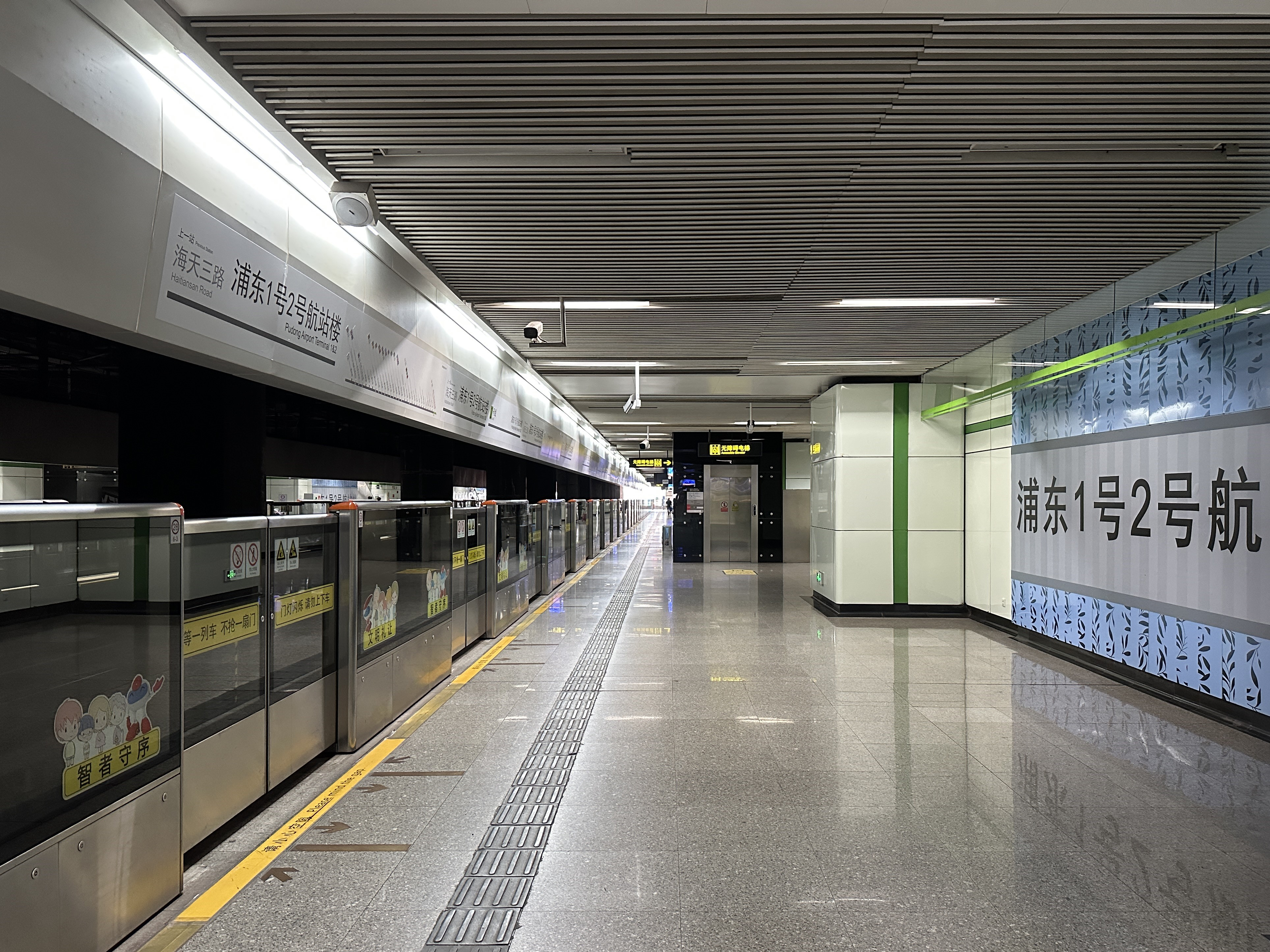
Line 2 platform of Pudong Airport Terminal 1&2

== Line 3 ==
Service Routes		Station Name		Opened	Location	Platform Level	Type of Platform	Transfers
Service Routes		English	Chinese (S)	Opened	Location	Platform Level	Type of Platform	Transfers
●	●	Shanghai South Railway Station	上海南站	26 December 2000	Xuhui	At-grade	Island platform	1 15 Jinshan; Shanghainan
●	●	Shilong Road	石龙路	26 December 2000	Xuhui	At-grade	Side platform	
●	●	Longcao Road	龙漕路	26 December 2000	Xuhui	Elevated	Side platform	12
●	●	Caoxi Road	漕溪路	26 December 2000	Xuhui	Elevated	Side platform	
●	●	Yishan Road	宜山路	26 December 2000	Xuhui	Elevated	Side platform	4 9
●	●	Hongqiao Road	虹桥路	26 December 2000	Changning	Elevated	Side platform	4 10
●	●	West Yan'an Road	延安西路	26 December 2000	Changning	Elevated	Side platform	4
●	●	Zhongshan Park	中山公园	26 December 2000	Changning	Elevated	Island platform	2 4
●	●	Jinshajiang Road	金沙江路	26 December 2000	Putuo	Elevated	Side platform	4 13
●	●	Caoyang Road	曹杨路	26 December 2000	Putuo	Elevated	Side platform	4 11 14
●	●	Zhenping Road	镇坪路	26 December 2000	Putuo	Elevated	Side platform	4 7
●	●	Zhongtan Road	中潭路	26 December 2000	Putuo	Elevated	Side platform	4
●	●	Shanghai Railway Station	上海火车站	26 December 2000	Jing'an	At-grade	Island platform	1 4 Shanghai
●	●	Baoshan Road	宝山路	26 December 2000	Jing'an	Elevated	Side platform	4
●	●	Dongbaoxing Road	东宝兴路	26 December 2000	Hongkou	Elevated	Side platform	
●	●	Hongkou Football Stadium	虹口足球场	26 December 2000	Hongkou	Elevated	Side platform	8
●	●	Chifeng Road	赤峰路	26 December 2000	Hongkou	Elevated	Side platform	
●	●	Dabaishu	大柏树	26 December 2000	Hongkou	Elevated	Side platform	
●	●	Jiangwan Town	江湾镇	26 December 2000	Hongkou	Elevated	Side platform	
●	●	West Yingao Road	殷高西路	18 December 2006	Baoshan	Elevated	Side platform	
●	●	South Changjiang Road	长江南路	18 December 2006	Baoshan	Elevated	Side platform	18
●		Songfa Road	淞发路	18 December 2006	Baoshan	Elevated	Side platform	
●		Zhanghuabang	张华浜	18 December 2006	Baoshan	Elevated	Side platform	
●		Songbin Road	淞滨路	18 December 2006	Baoshan	Elevated	Side platform	
●		Shuichan Road	水产路	18 December 2006	Baoshan	Elevated	Side platform	
●		Baoyang Road	宝杨路	18 December 2006	Baoshan	Elevated	Side platform	
●		Youyi Road	友谊路	18 December 2006	Baoshan	Elevated	Side platform	
●		Tieli Road	铁力路	18 December 2006	Baoshan	Underground	Side platform	
●		North Jiangyang Road	江杨北路	18 December 2006	Baoshan	At-grade	Side platform	

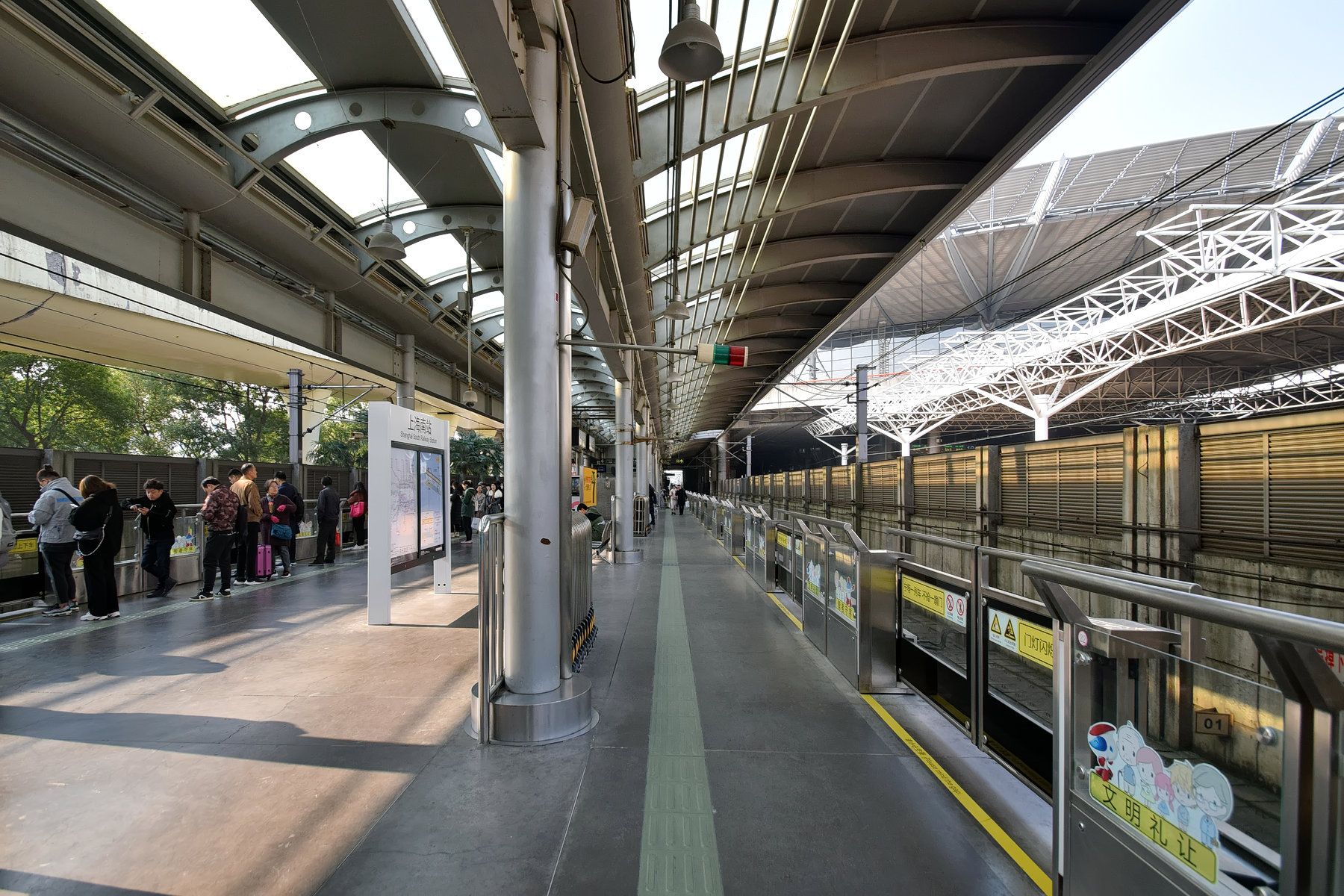
Line 3 platform of Shanghai South Railway Station

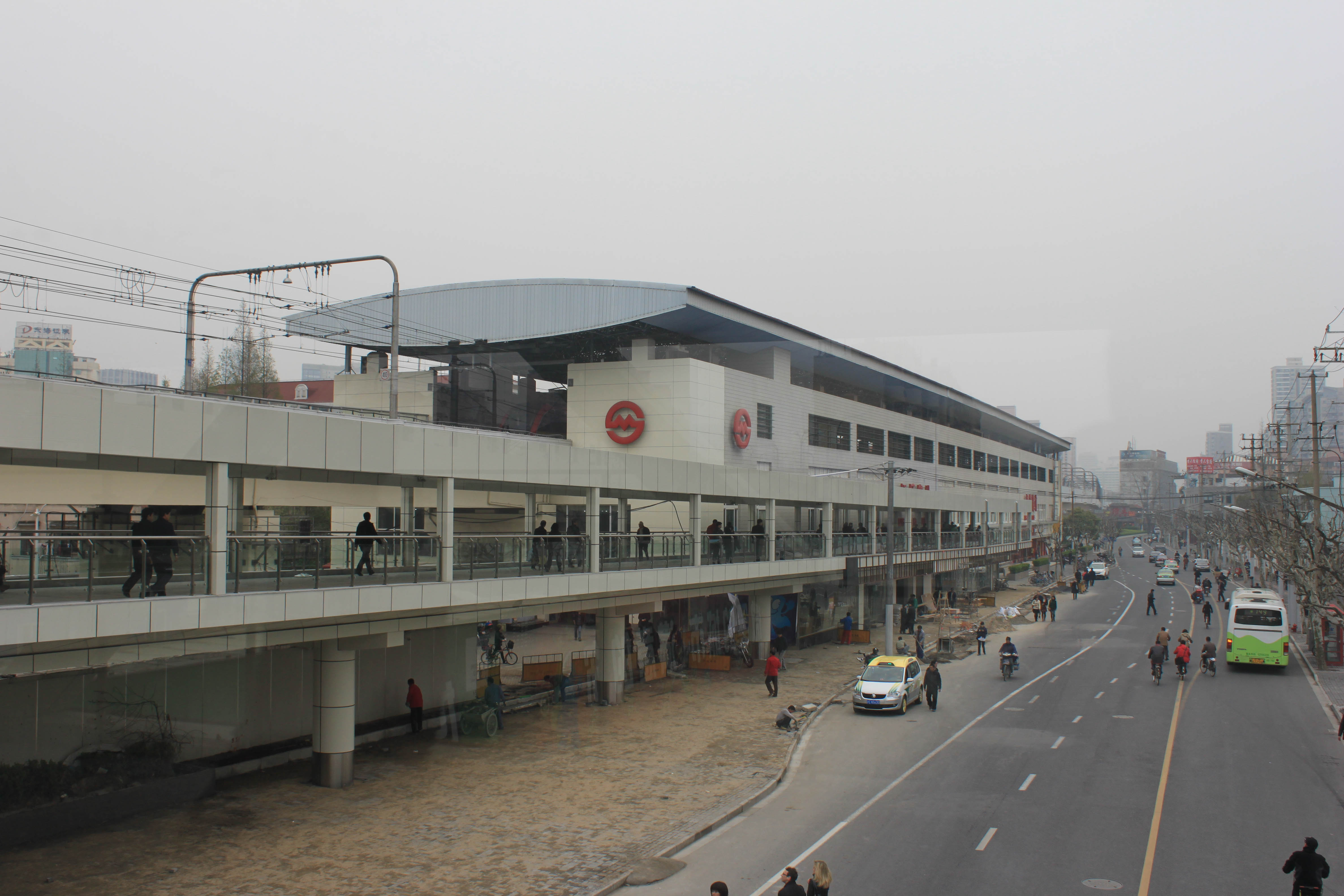
Lines 3 and 4 Hongqiao Road station exterior

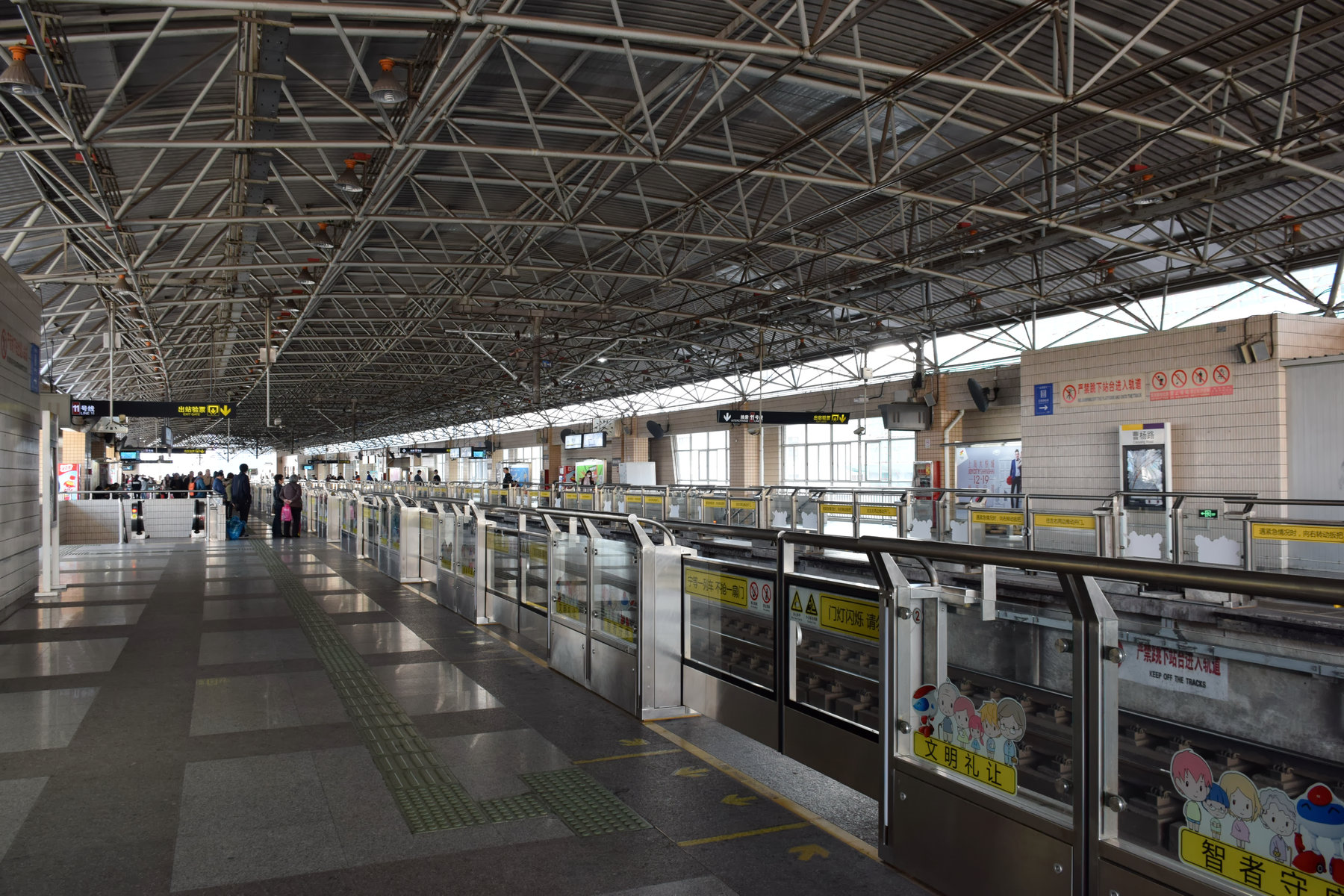
Lines 3 and 4 platform of Caoyang Road

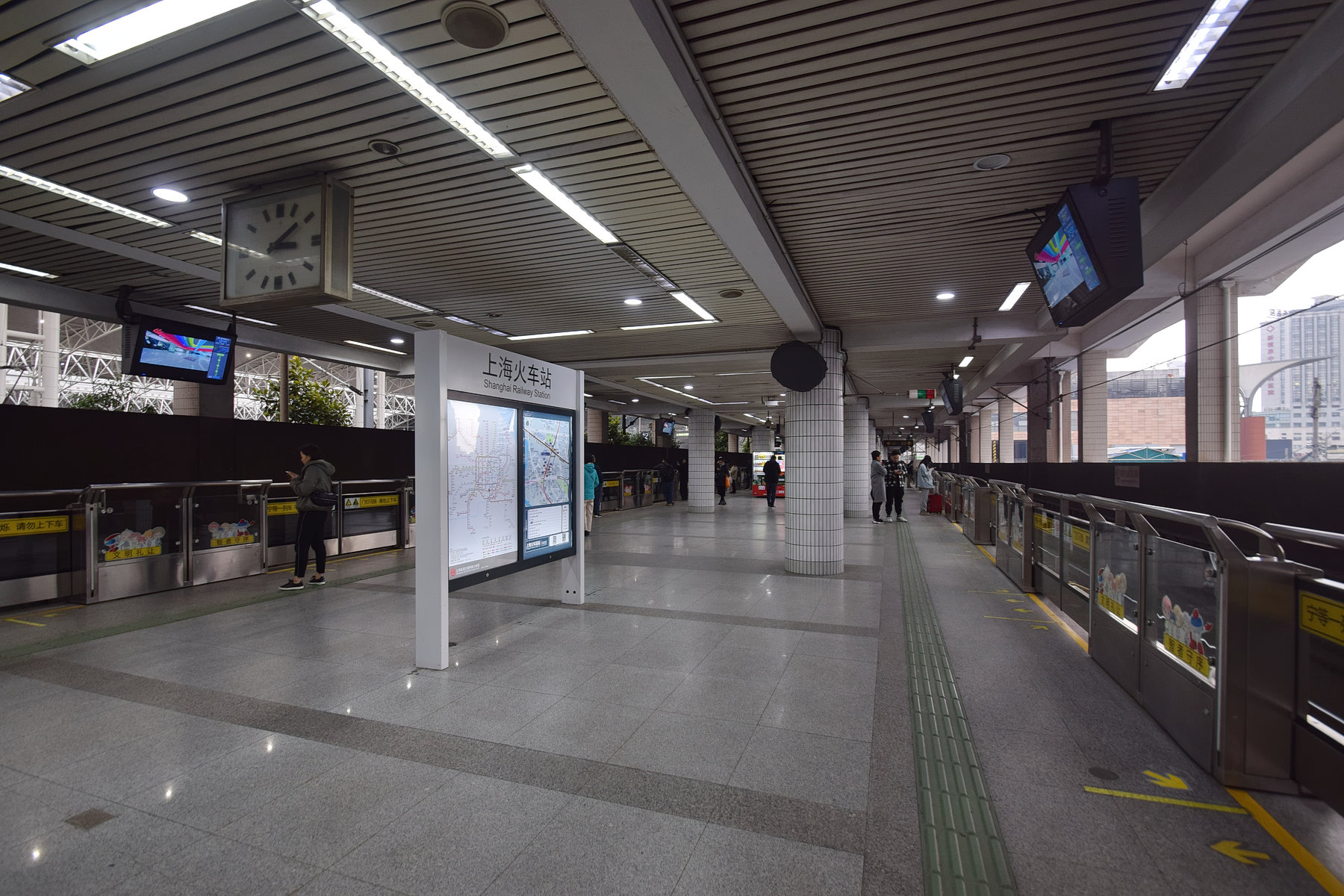
Lines 3 and 4 platform of Shanghai Railway Station

== Line 4 ==
Line 4 is the loop-line of the Shanghai Metro. Some trains terminate at Yishan Road.

Station Name		Opened	Location	Platform Level	Type of Platform	Transfers
English	Chinese (S)	Opened	Location	Platform Level	Type of Platform	Transfers
— ↑ Loop line towards Shanghai Indoor Stadium ↑ —
Yishan Road	宜山路	31 December 2005	Xuhui	Underground	Island platform	3 9
Hongqiao Road	虹桥路	31 December 2005	Changning	Elevated	Side platform	3 10
West Yan'an Road	延安西路	31 December 2005	Changning	Elevated	Side platform	3
Zhongshan Park	中山公园	31 December 2005	Changning	Elevated	Island platform	2 3
Jinshajiang Road	金沙江路	31 December 2005	Putuo	Elevated	Side platform	3 13
Caoyang Road	曹杨路	31 December 2005	Putuo	Elevated	Side platform	3 11 14
Zhenping Road	镇坪路	31 December 2005	Putuo	Elevated	Side platform	3 7
Zhongtan Road	中潭路	31 December 2005	Putuo	Elevated	Side platform	3
Shanghai Railway Station	上海火车站	31 December 2005	Jing'an	At-grade	Island platform	1 3 Shanghai
Baoshan Road	宝山路	31 December 2005	Jing'an	Elevated	Side platform	3
Hailun Road	海伦路	31 December 2005	Hongkou	Underground	Island platform	10
Linping Road	临平路	31 December 2005	Hongkou	Underground	One side platform and one island platform	
Dalian Road	大连路	31 December 2005	Hongkou/Yangpu	Underground	Island platform	12
Yangshupu Road	杨树浦路	31 December 2005	Yangpu	Underground	Island platform	
Pudong Avenue	浦东大道	31 December 2005	Pudong	Underground	Island platform	14
Century Avenue	世纪大道	31 December 2005	Pudong	Underground	Island platform	2 6 9
Xiangcheng Road	向城路	31 December 2005	Pudong	Underground	Island platform	
Lancun Road	蓝村路	31 December 2005	Pudong	Underground	Island platform	6
Tangqiao	塘桥	29 December 2007	Pudong	Underground	Island platform	
Nanpu Bridge	南浦大桥	29 December 2007	Huangpu	Underground	Split platform	
South Xizang Road	西藏南路	29 December 2007	Huangpu	Underground	Island platform	8
Luban Road	鲁班路	29 December 2007	Huangpu	Underground	Island platform	
Damuqiao Road	大木桥路	31 December 2005	Xuhui	Underground	Island platform	12
Dong'an Road	东安路	31 December 2005	Xuhui	Underground	Island platform	7
Shanghai Stadium	上海体育场	31 December 2005	Xuhui	Underground	Island platform	
Shanghai Indoor Stadium	上海体育馆	31 December 2005	Xuhui	Underground	Island platform	1
— ↓ Loop line towards Yishan Road ↓ —

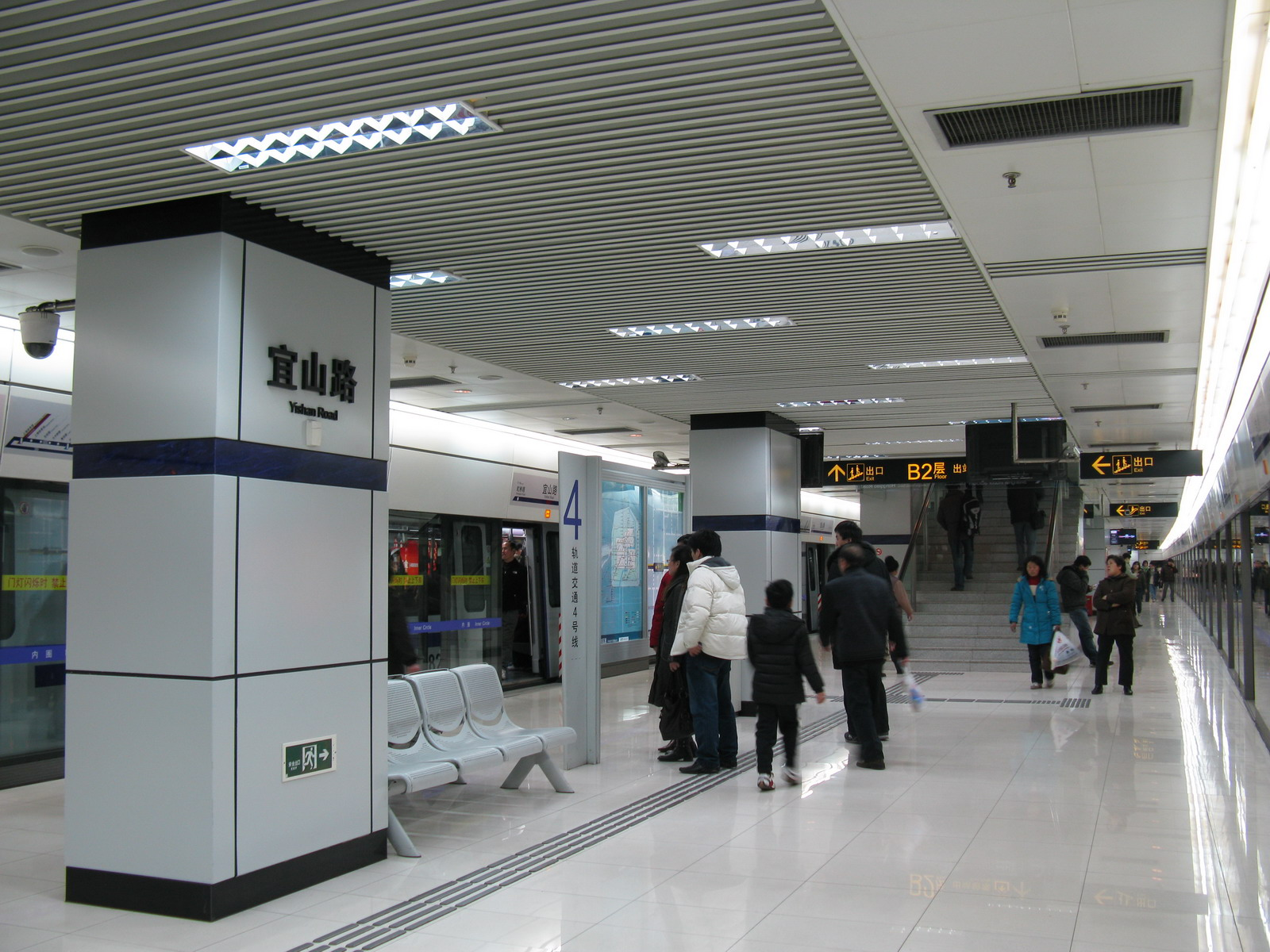
Line 4 platform of Yishan Road

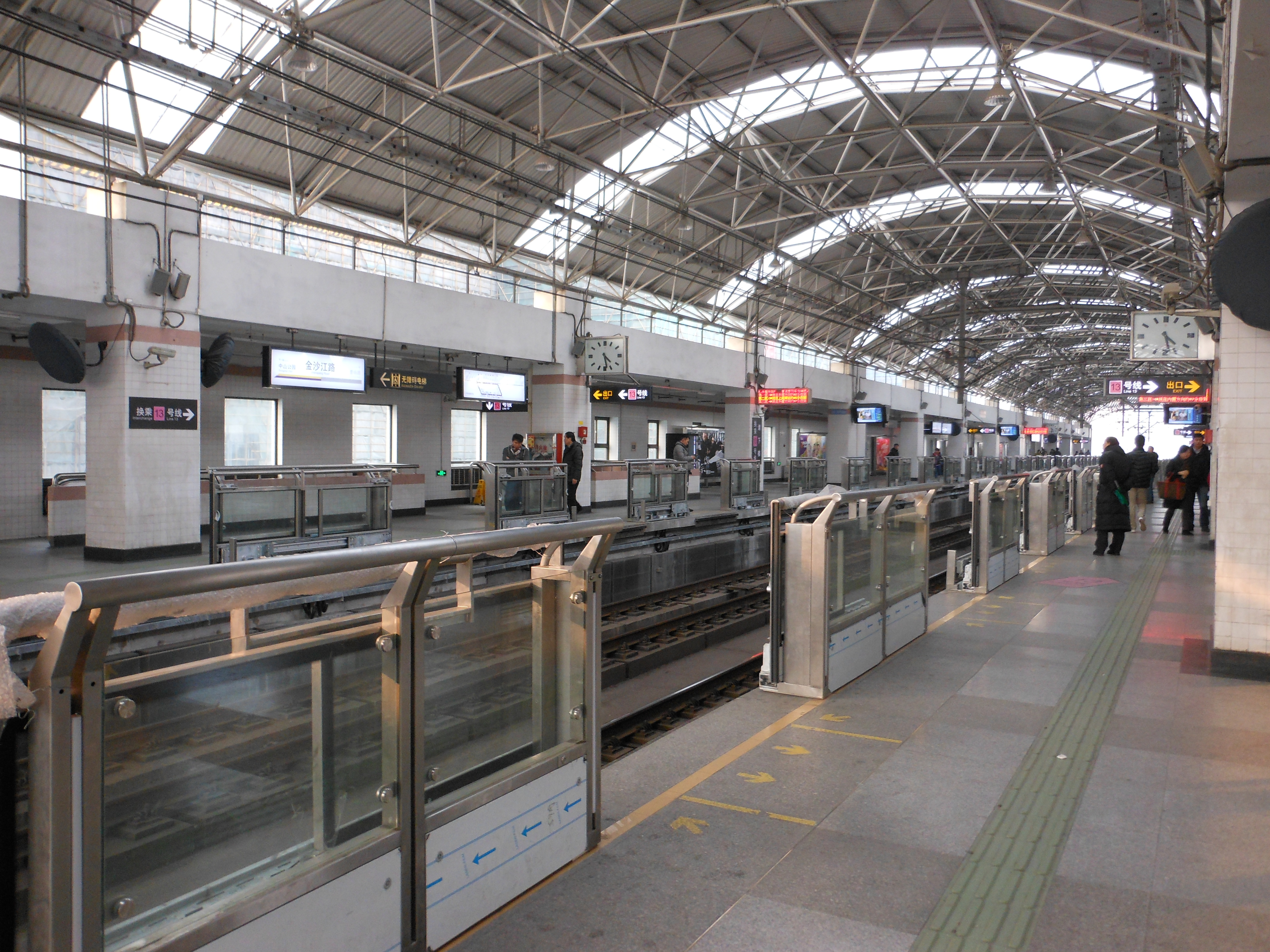
Lines 3 and 4 platform of Jinshajiang Road

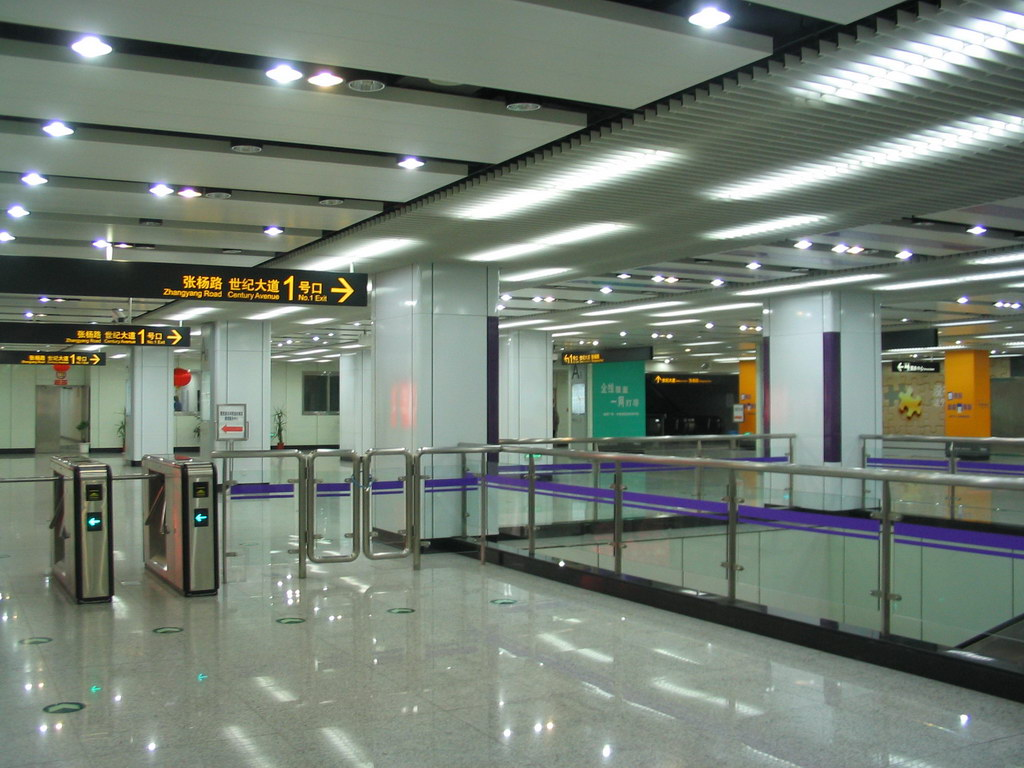
Line 4 concourse of Century Avenue

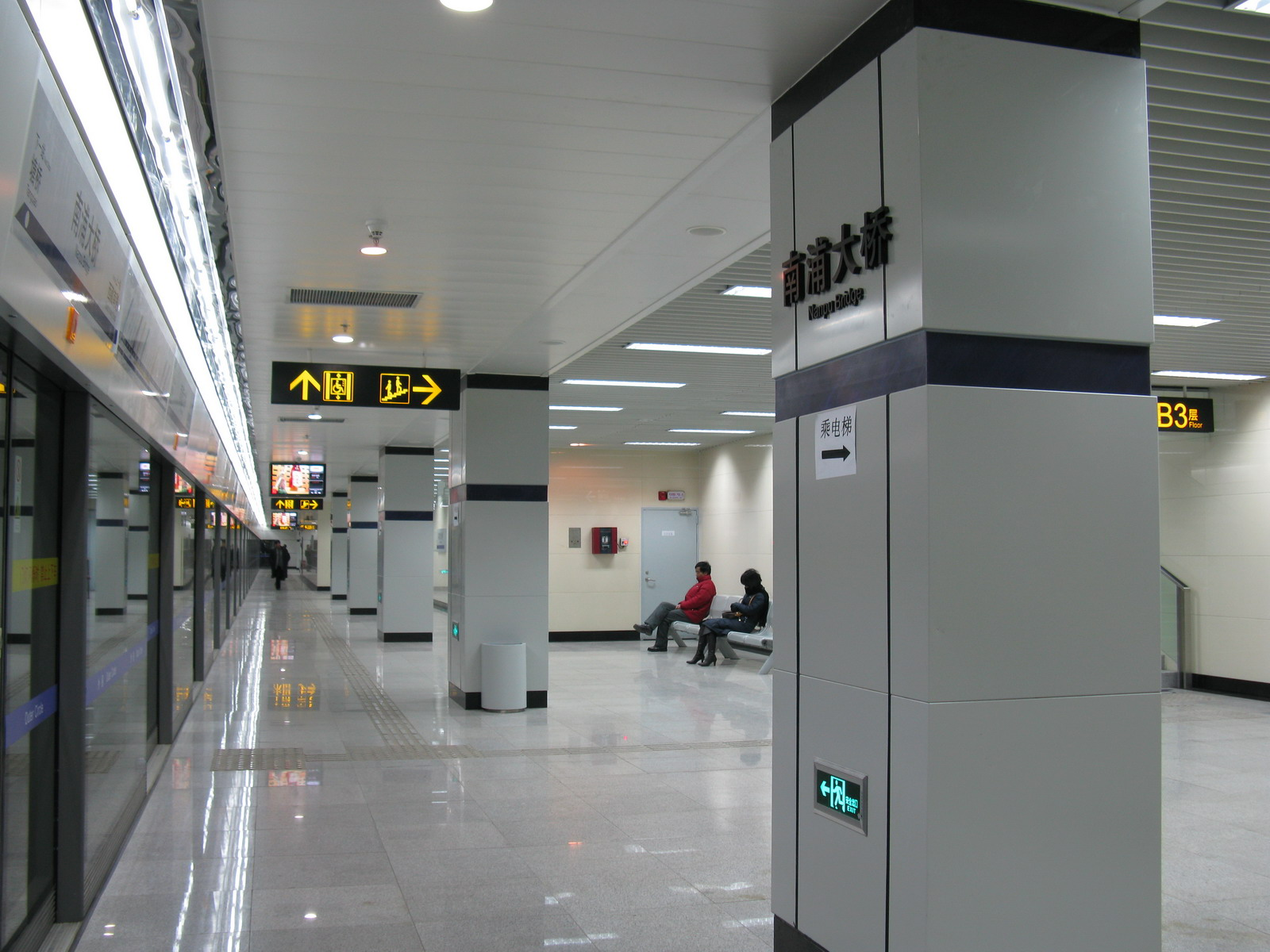
Line 4 platform of Nanpu Bridge

== Line 5 ==
Service Routes		Station Name		Opened	Location	Platform Level	Type of Platform	Transfers
Service Routes		English	Chinese (S)	Opened	Location	Platform Level	Type of Platform	Transfers
Mainline
●	●	Xinzhuang	莘庄	25 November 2003	Minhang	At-grade	Side platform	1 Jinshan; Xinzhuang
●	●	Chunshen Road	春申路	25 November 2003	Minhang	Elevated	Side platform	
●	●	Yindu Road	银都路	25 November 2003	Minhang	Elevated	Side platform	
●	●	Zhuanqiao	颛桥	25 November 2003	Minhang	Elevated	Side platform	
●	●	Beiqiao	北桥	25 November 2003	Minhang	Elevated	Side platform	
●	●	Jianchuan Road	剑川路	25 November 2003	Minhang	Elevated	Side platform	
●	●	Dongchuan Road	东川路	25 November 2003	Minhang	Elevated	Double Island platform	
●	｜	Jiangchuan Road	江川路	30 December 2018	Minhang	Elevated	Side platform	
●	｜	Xidu	西渡	30 December 2018	Fengxian	Elevated	Side platform	
●	｜	Xiaotang	萧塘	30 December 2018	Fengxian	Elevated	Side platform	
●	｜	Fengpu Avenue	奉浦大道	30 December 2018	Fengxian	Elevated	Island platform	
●	｜	Huanchengdong Road	环城东路	30 December 2018	Fengxian	Underground	Island platform	
●	｜	Wangyuan Road	望园路	30 December 2018	Fengxian	Underground	Island platform	
●	｜	Jinhai Lake	金海湖	30 December 2018	Fengxian	Underground	Island platform	
●	｜	Fengxian Xincheng	奉贤新城	30 December 2018	Fengxian	Underground	Island platform	
Branch
	●	Jinping Road	金平路	25 November 2003	Minhang	Elevated	Side platform	
	●	Huaning Road	华宁路	25 November 2003	Minhang	Elevated	Side platform	
	●	Wenjing Road	文井路	25 November 2003	Minhang	Elevated	Side platform	
	●	Minhang Development Zone	闵行开发区	25 November 2003	Minhang	Elevated	Side platform	

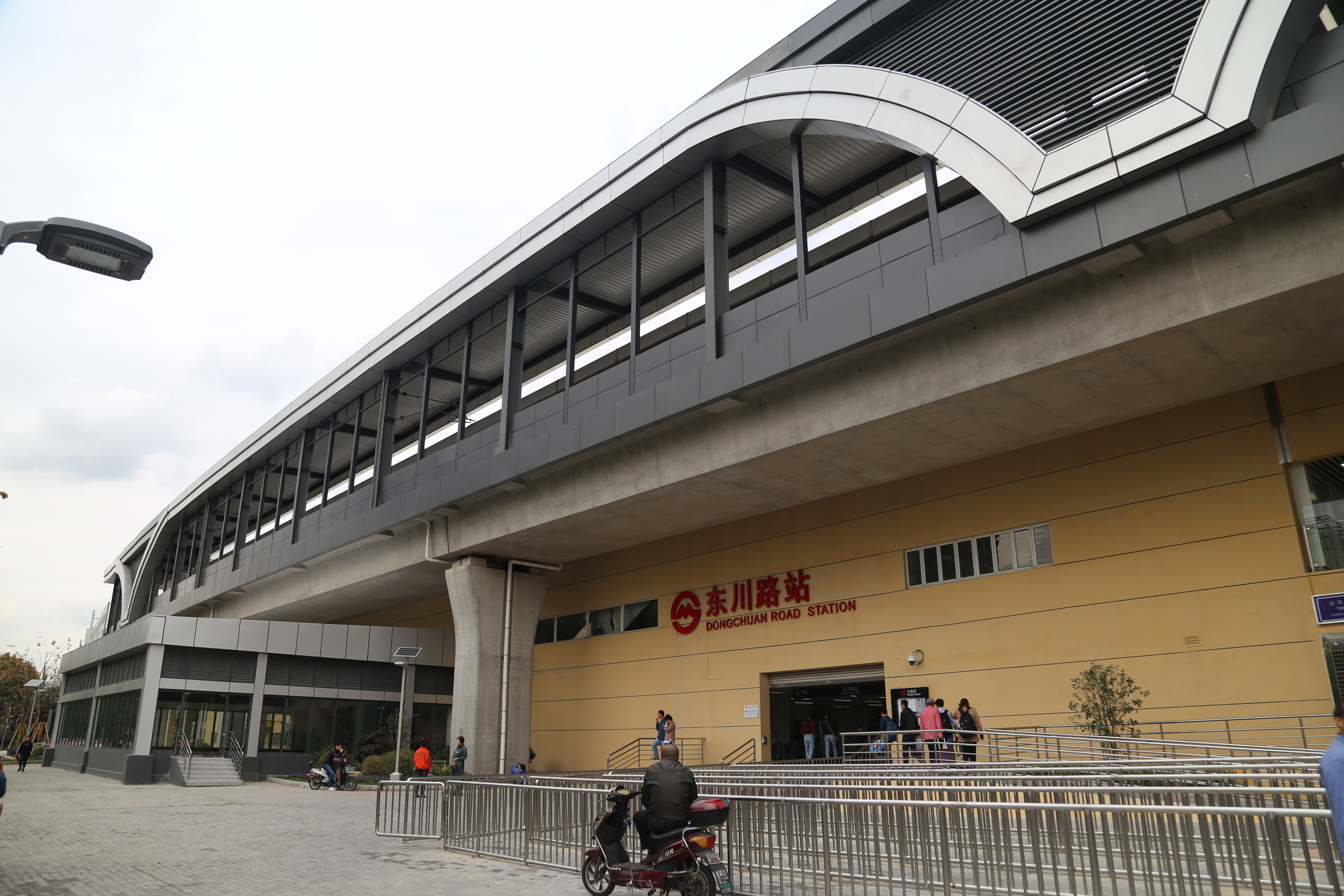
Line 5 Dongchuan Road station exterior

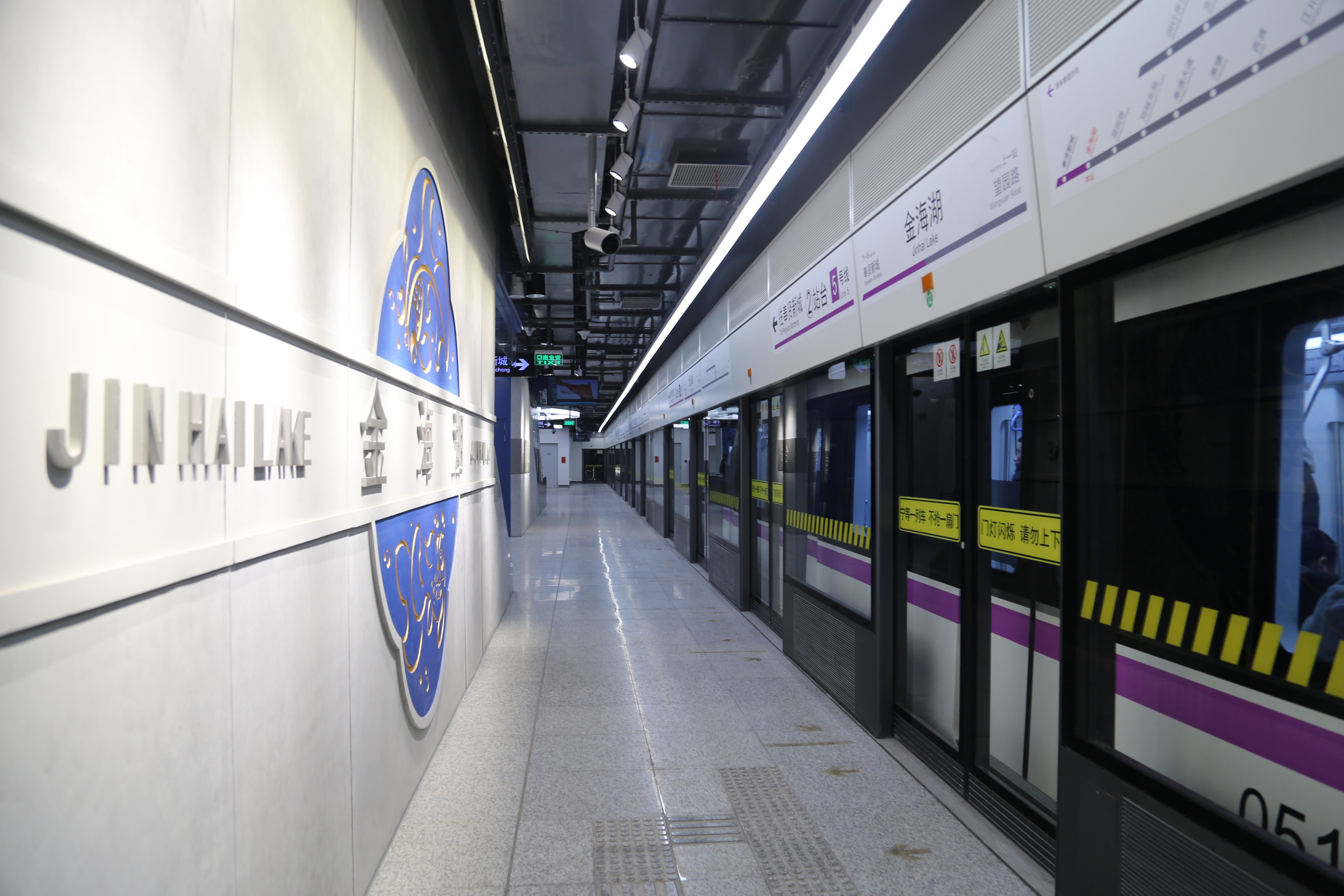
Line 5 platform of Jinhai Lake

== Line 6 ==
Service Routes		Station Name		Opened	Location	Platform Level	Type of Platform	Transfers
Service Routes		English	Chinese (S)	Opened	Location	Platform Level	Type of Platform	Transfers
●		Gangcheng Road	港城路	29 December 2007	Pudong	Elevated	Side platform	10
●		North Waigaoqiao Free Trade Zone	外高桥保税区北	29 December 2007	Pudong	Elevated	Side platform	
●		Hangjin Road	航津路	29 December 2007	Pudong	Elevated	Side platform	
●		South Waigaoqiao Free Trade Zone	外高桥保税区南	29 December 2007	Pudong	Elevated	Side platform	
●		Zhouhai Road	洲海路	29 December 2007	Pudong	Elevated	Side platform	
●		Wuzhou Avenue	五洲大道	29 December 2007	Pudong	Elevated	Side platform	
●		Dongjing Road	东靖路	29 December 2007	Pudong	Elevated	Side platform	
●	●	Jufeng Road	巨峰路	29 December 2007	Pudong	Elevated	Island platform	12
●	●	Wulian Road	五莲路	29 December 2007	Pudong	Elevated	Side platform	
●	●	Boxing Road	博兴路	29 December 2007	Pudong	Underground	Side platform	
●	●	Jinqiao Road	金桥路	29 December 2007	Pudong	Underground	Side platform	
●	●	Yunshan Road	云山路	29 December 2007	Pudong	Underground	Side platform	14
●	●	Deping Road	德平路	29 December 2007	Pudong	Underground	Side platform	
●	●	Beiyangjing Road	北洋泾路	29 December 2007	Pudong	Underground	Side platform	
●	●	Minsheng Road	民生路	29 December 2007	Pudong	Underground	Side platform	18
●	●	Yuanshen Sports Center	源深体育中心	29 December 2007	Pudong	Underground	Side platform	
●	●	Century Avenue	世纪大道	29 December 2007	Pudong	Underground	Side platform	2 4 9
●	●	Pudian Road	浦电路	29 December 2007	Pudong	Underground	Island platform	
●	●	Lancun Road	蓝村路	29 December 2007	Pudong	Underground	Island platform	4
●	●	Shanghai Children's Medical Center	上海儿童医学中心	29 December 2007	Pudong	Underground	Island platform	
●	●	Linyi Xincun	临沂新村	29 December 2007	Pudong	Underground	Island platform	
●	●	West Gaoke Road	高科西路	29 December 2007	Pudong	Underground	Island platform	7
●	●	Dongming Road	东明路	29 December 2007	Pudong	Underground	Island platform	13
●	●	Gaoqing Road	高青路	29 December 2007	Pudong	Underground	Island platform	
●		West Huaxia Road	华夏西路	29 December 2007	Pudong	Underground	Side platform	
●		Shangnan Road	上南路	29 December 2007	Pudong	Underground	Side platform	
●		South Lingyan Road	灵岩南路	29 December 2007	Pudong	Underground	Side platform	
●		Oriental Sports Center	东方体育中心	12 April 2011	Pudong	Underground	Double island platform (shared with Line 11)	8 11

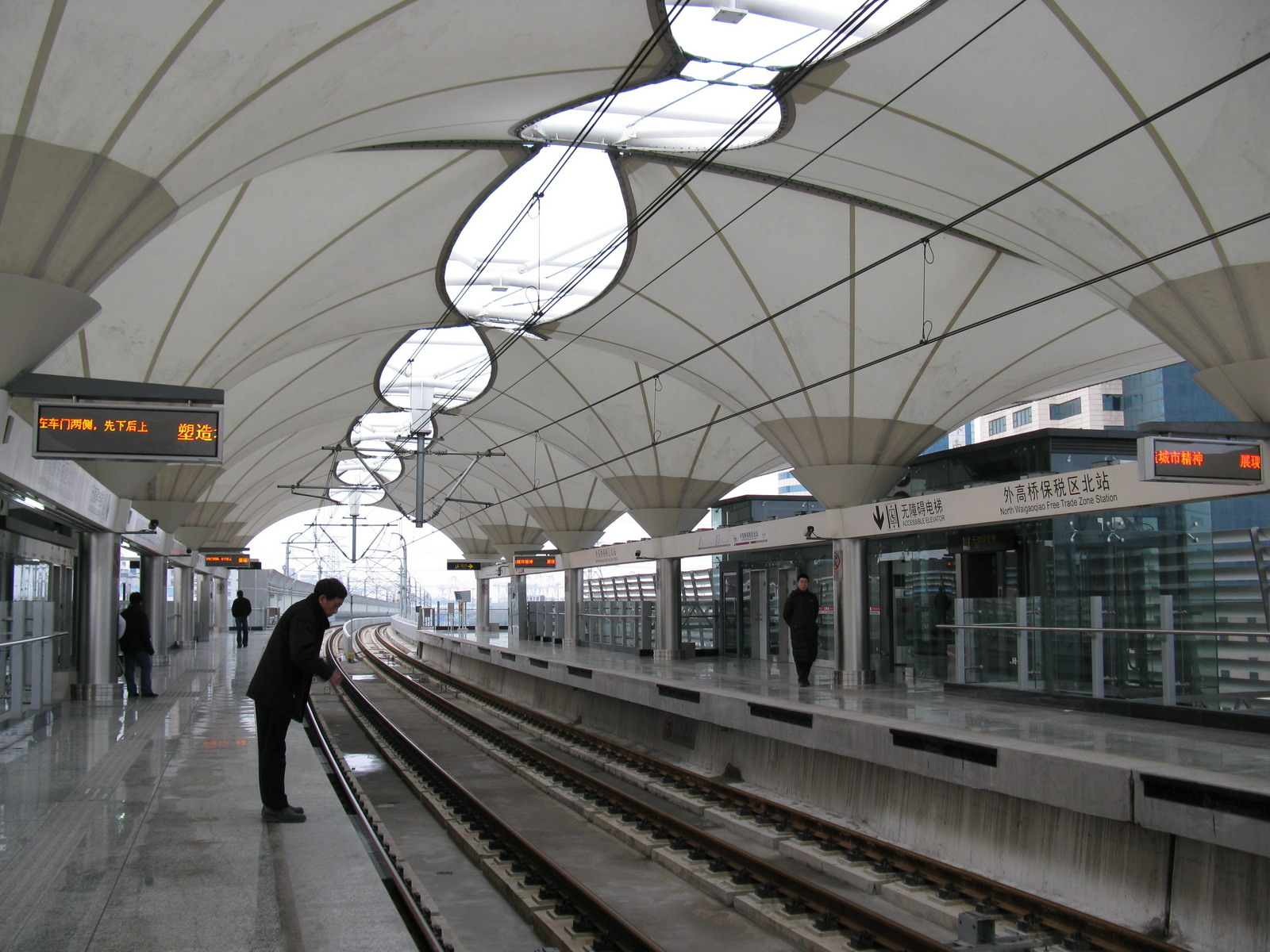
Line 6 platform of North Waigaoqiao Free Trade Zone

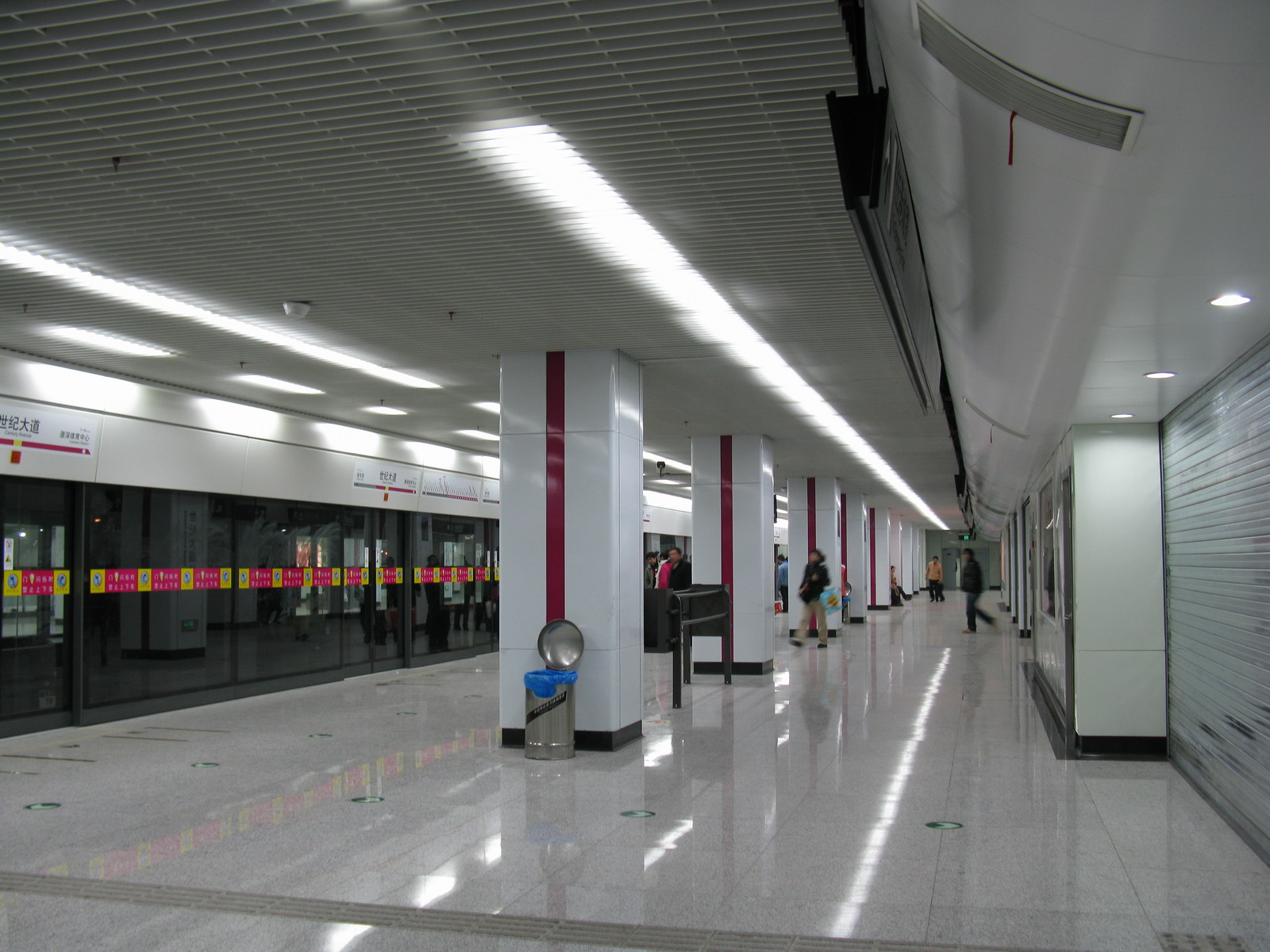
Line 6 platform of Century Avenue

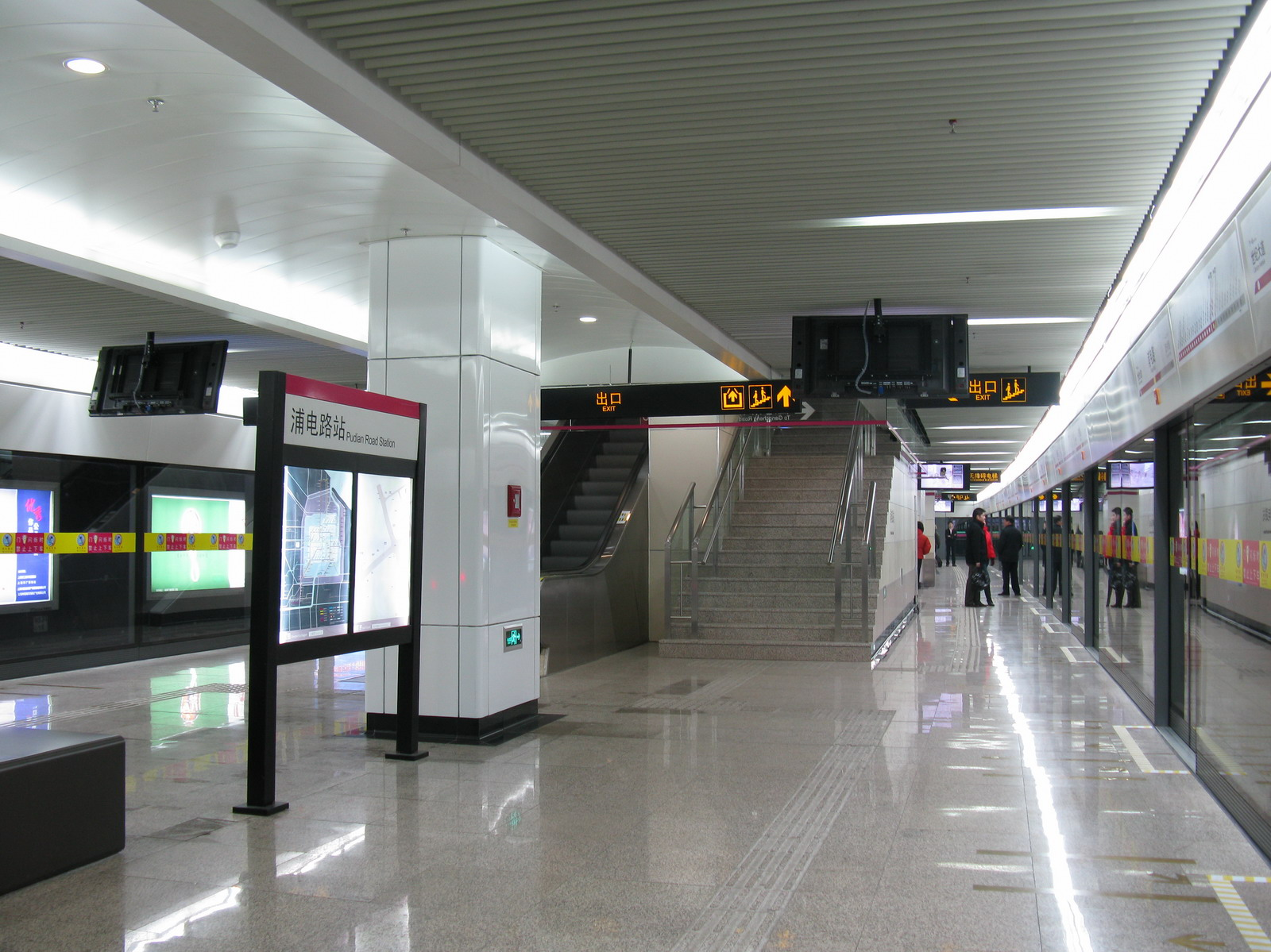
Line 6 platform of Pudian Road

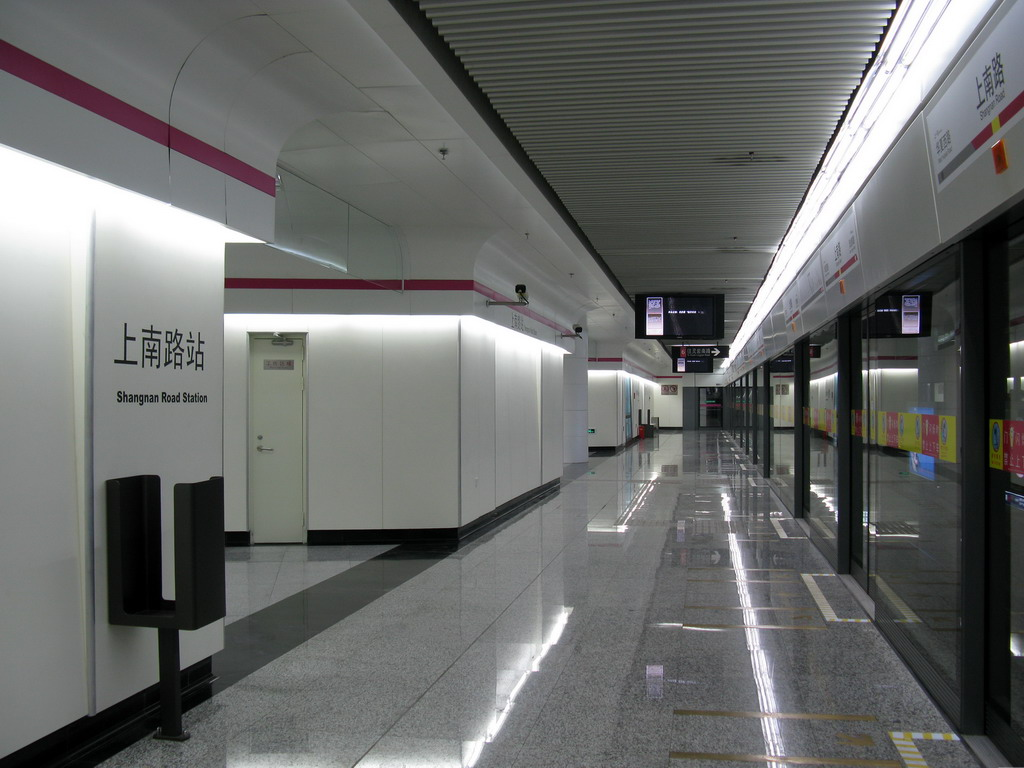
Line 6 platform of Shangnan Road

== Line 7 ==
Service Routes		Station Name		Opened	Location	Platform Level	Type of Platform	Transfers
Service Routes		English	Chinese (S)	Opened	Location	Platform Level	Type of Platform	Transfers
●		Meilan Lake	美兰湖	28 December 2010	Baoshan	Elevated	Side platform	
●		Luonan Xincun	罗南新村	28 December 2010	Baoshan	Elevated	Side platform	
●		Panguang Road	潘广路	30 June 2011	Baoshan	Underground	Island platform	
●		Liuhang	刘行	30 June 2011	Baoshan	Underground	Island platform	
●		Gucun Park	顾村公园	28 December 2010	Baoshan	Underground	Island platform	15
●	●	Qihua Road	祁华路	22 July 2014	Baoshan	Underground	Island platform	
●	●	Shanghai University	上海大学	5 December 2009	Baoshan	Underground	Island platform	
●	●	Nanchen Road	南陈路	5 December 2009	Baoshan	Underground	Island platform	
●	●	Shangda Road	上大路	5 December 2009	Baoshan	Underground	One side platform and one island platform	
●	●	Changzhong Road	场中路	5 December 2009	Baoshan	Underground	Island platform	
●	●	Dachang Town	大场镇	5 December 2009	Baoshan	Underground	Island platform	
●	●	Xingzhi Road	行知路	5 December 2009	Baoshan	Underground	Island platform	
●	●	Dahuasan Road	大华三路	5 December 2009	Baoshan	Underground	Island platform	
●	●	Xincun Road	新村路	5 December 2009	Putuo	Underground	Island platform	
●	●	Langao Road	岚皋路	5 December 2009	Putuo	Underground	Island platform	
●	●	Zhenping Road	镇坪路	5 December 2009	Putuo	Underground	Island platform	3 4
●	●	Changshou Road	长寿路	5 December 2009	Putuo	Underground	Island platform	13
●	●	Changping Road	昌平路	5 December 2009	Jing'an	Underground	Side platform	
●	●	Jing'an Temple	静安寺	5 December 2009	Jing'an	Underground	Island platform	2 14
●	●	Changshu Road	常熟路	5 December 2009	Xuhui	Underground	Island platform	1
●	●	Zhaojiabang Road	肇嘉浜路	5 December 2009	Xuhui	Underground	Island platform	9
●	●	Dong'an Road	东安路	5 December 2009	Xuhui	Underground	Island platform	4
●	●	Middle Longhua Road	龙华中路	5 December 2009	Xuhui	Underground	Island platform	12
●	●	Houtan	后滩	20 April 2010	Pudong	Underground	Island platform	
●	●	Changqing Road	长清路	5 December 2009	Pudong	Underground	Island platform	13
●	●	Yaohua Road	耀华路	5 December 2009	Pudong	Underground	Island platform	8
●	●	Yuntai Road	云台路	5 December 2009	Pudong	Underground	Island platform	
●	●	West Gaoke Road	高科西路	5 December 2009	Pudong	Underground	Island platform	6
●	●	South Yanggao Road	杨高南路	5 December 2009	Pudong	Underground	Double island platform	
●	●	Jinxiu Road	锦绣路	5 December 2009	Pudong	Underground	Island platform	
●	●	Fanghua Road	芳华路	5 December 2009	Pudong	Underground	Island platform	
●	●	Longyang Road	龙阳路	5 December 2009	Pudong	Underground	Island platform	2 16 18; Maglev
●	●	Huamu Road	花木路	5 December 2009	Pudong	Underground	Island platform	

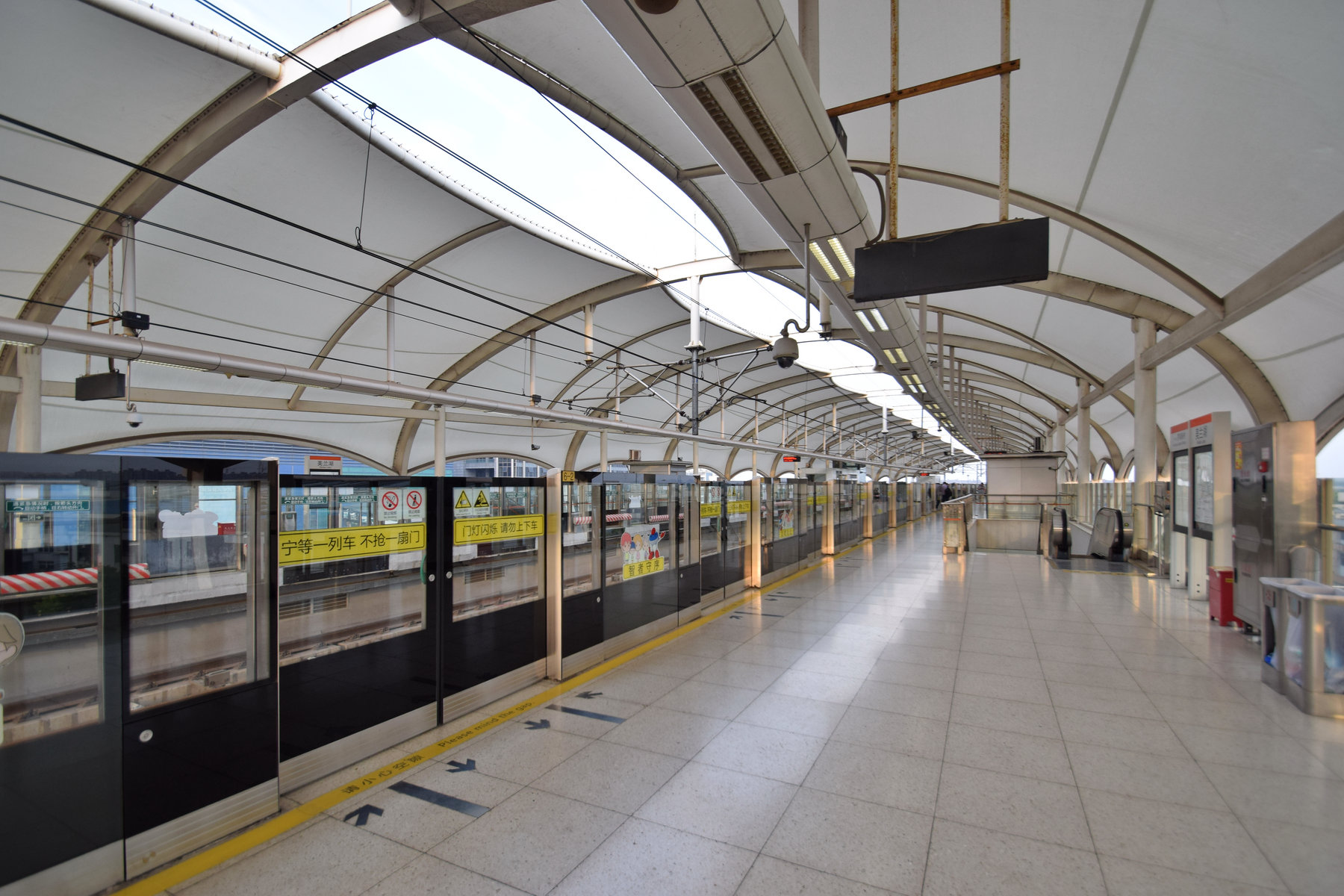
Line 7 platform of Meilan Lake

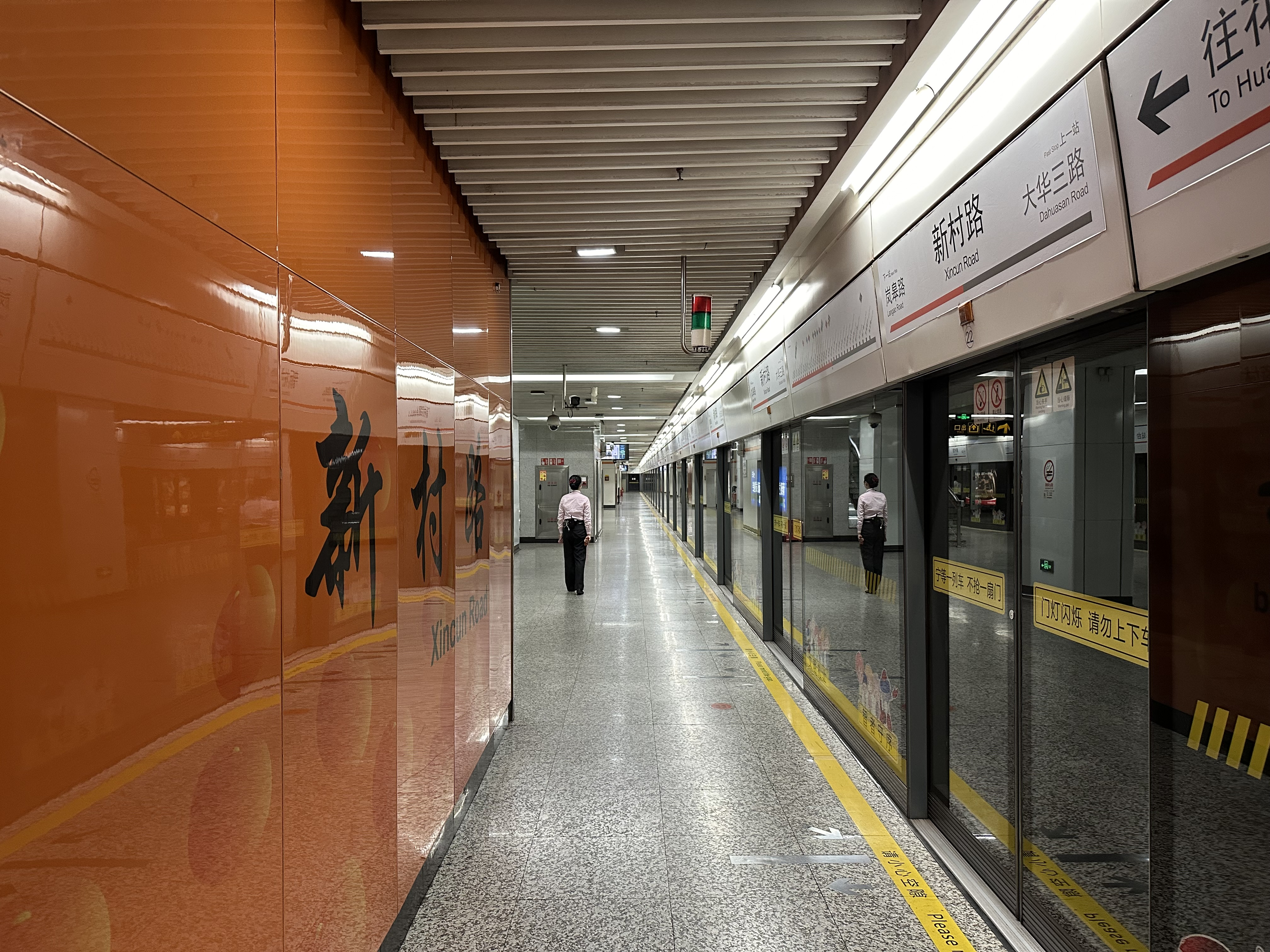
Line 7 platform of Xincun Road

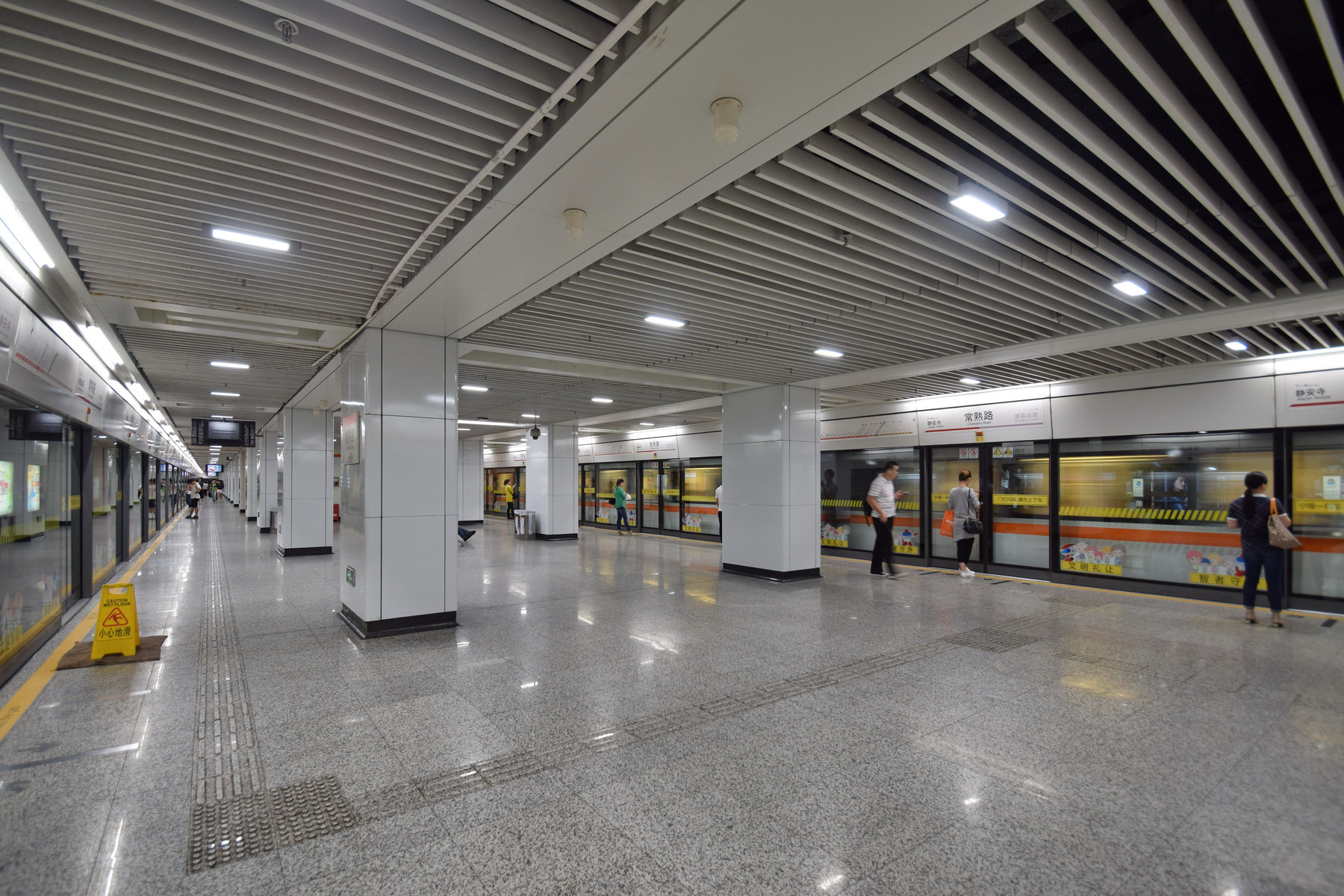
Line 7 platform of Changshu Road

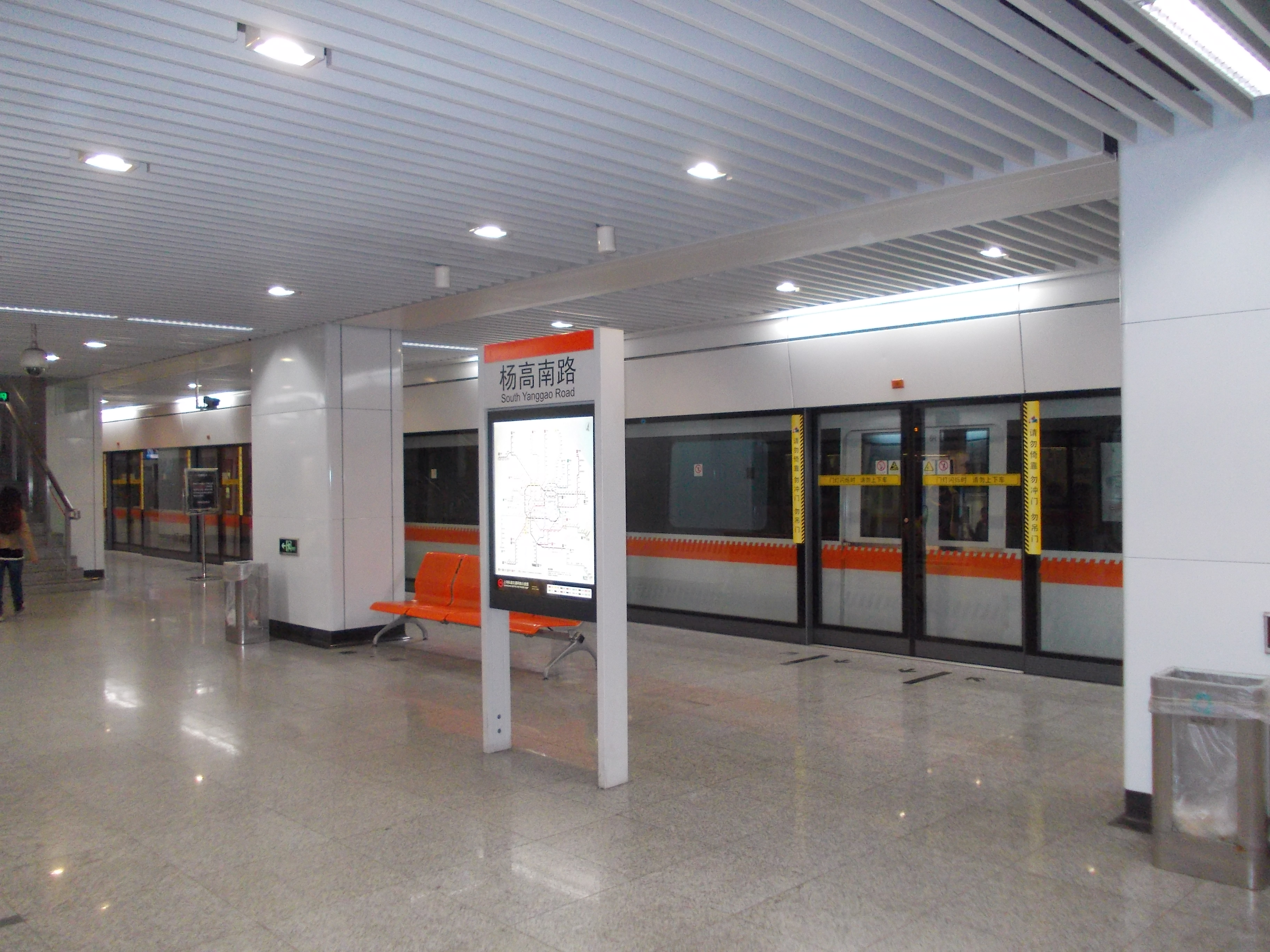
Line 7 platform of South Yanggao Road

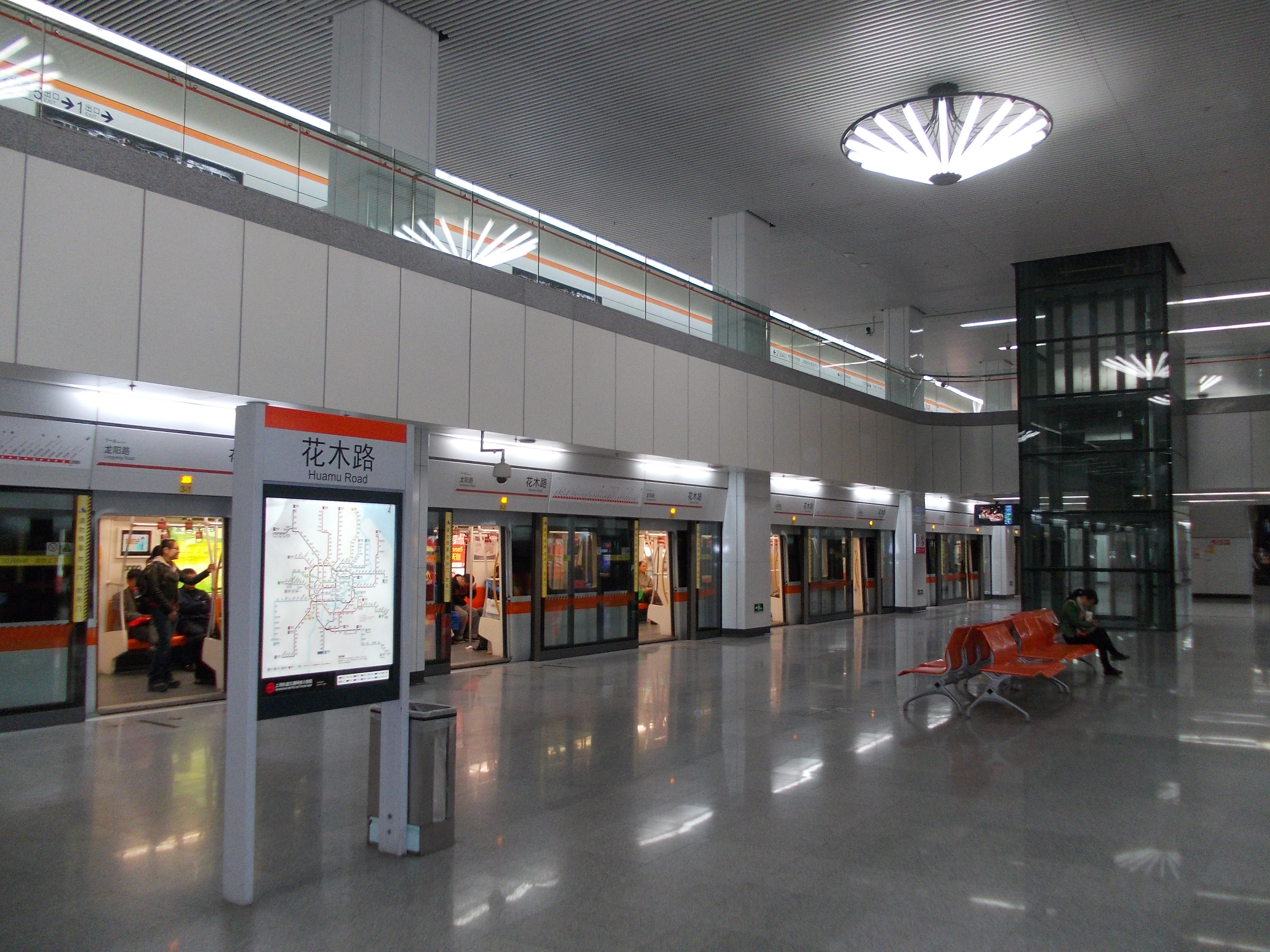
Line 7 platform of Huamu Road

== Line 8 ==
Service Routes		Station Name		Opened	Location	Platform Level	Type of Platform	Transfers
Service Routes		English	Chinese (S)	Opened	Location	Platform Level	Type of Platform	Transfers
●		Shiguang Road	市光路	29 December 2007	Yangpu	Underground	Side platform	
●		Nenjiang Road	嫩江路	29 December 2007	Yangpu	Underground	Side platform	
●		Xiangyin Road	翔殷路	29 December 2007	Yangpu	Underground	Side platform	
●		Huangxing Park	黄兴公园	29 December 2007	Yangpu	Underground	Side platform	
●	●	Middle Yanji Road	延吉中路	29 December 2007	Yangpu	Underground	Island platform	
●	●	Huangxing Road	黄兴路	29 December 2007	Yangpu	Underground	Island platform	
●	●	Jiangpu Road	江浦路	29 December 2007	Yangpu	Underground	Island platform	18
●	●	Anshan Xincun	鞍山新村	29 December 2007	Yangpu	Underground	Island platform	
●	●	Siping Road	四平路	29 December 2007	Yangpu/Hongkou	Underground	Island platform	10
●	●	Quyang Road	曲阳路	29 December 2007	Hongkou	Underground	Side platform	
●	●	Hongkou Football Stadium	虹口足球场	29 December 2007	Hongkou	Underground	Island platform	3
●	●	North Xizang Road	西藏北路	29 December 2007	Jing'an	Underground	Island platform	
●	●	Zhongxing Road	中兴路	29 December 2007	Jing'an	Underground	Island platform	
●	●	Qufu Road	曲阜路	29 December 2007	Jing'an	Underground	Island platform	12
●	●	People's Square	人民广场	29 December 2007	Huangpu	Underground	One side platform and one island platform	1 2
●	●	Dashijie	大世界	29 December 2007	Huangpu	Underground	Island platform	14
●	●	Laoximen	老西门	29 December 2007	Huangpu	Underground	Island platform	10
●	●	Lujiabang Road	陆家浜路	29 December 2007	Huangpu	Underground	Island platform	9
●	●	South Xizang Road	西藏南路	29 December 2007	Huangpu	Underground	Island platform	4
●	●	China Art Museum	中华艺术宫	28 September 2012	Pudong	Underground	Island platform	
●	●	Yaohua Road	耀华路	29 December 2007	Pudong	Underground	Side platform	7
●	●	Chengshan Road	成山路	5 July 2009	Pudong	Underground	Island platform	13
●	●	Yangsi	杨思	5 July 2009	Pudong	Underground	Island platform	
●	●	Oriental Sports Center	东方体育中心	12 April 2011	Pudong	Underground	Island platform	6 11
●		Lingzhao Xincun	凌兆新村	5 July 2009	Pudong	Underground	Island platform	
●		Luheng Road	芦恒路	5 July 2009	Minhang	Underground	Island platform	
●		Pujiang Town	浦江镇	5 July 2009	Minhang	Elevated	Island platform	
●		Jiangyue Road	江月路	5 July 2009	Minhang	Elevated	Island platform	
●		Lianhang Road	联航路	5 July 2009	Minhang	Elevated	Island platform	
●		Shendu Highway	沈杜公路	5 July 2009	Minhang	Elevated	Island platform	Pujiang Fengpu BRT

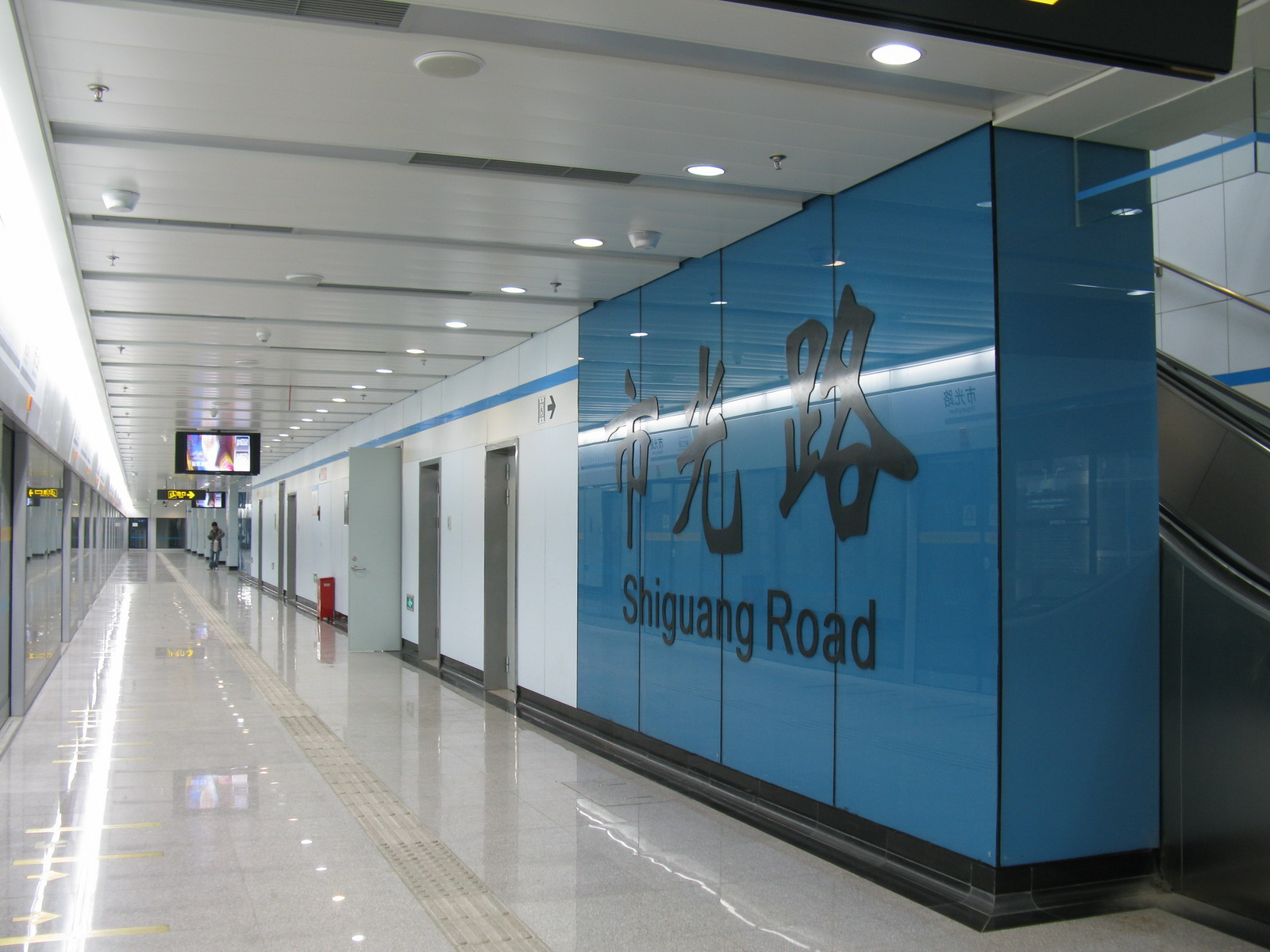
Line 8 platform of Shiguang Road

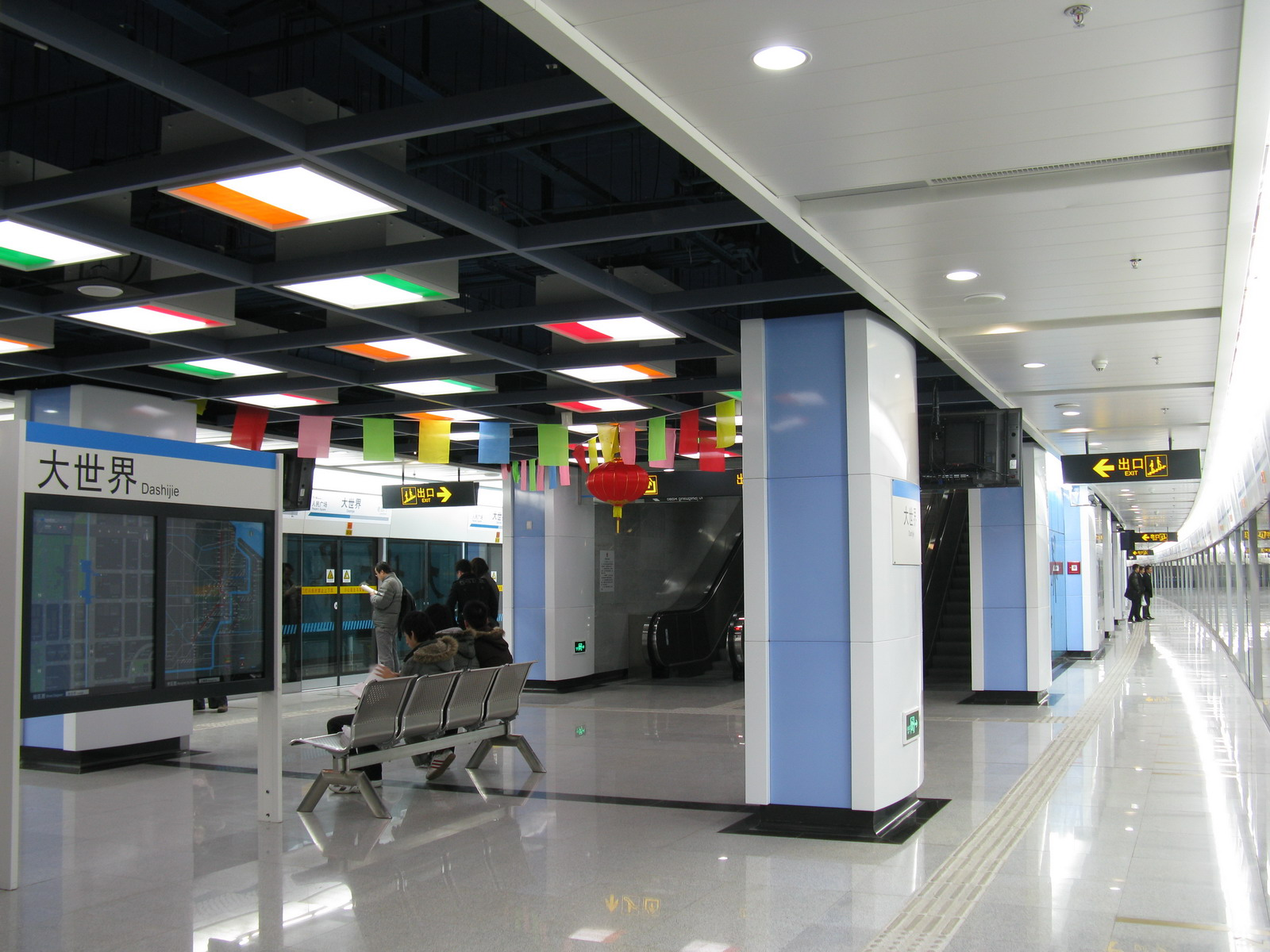
Line 8 platform of Dashijie

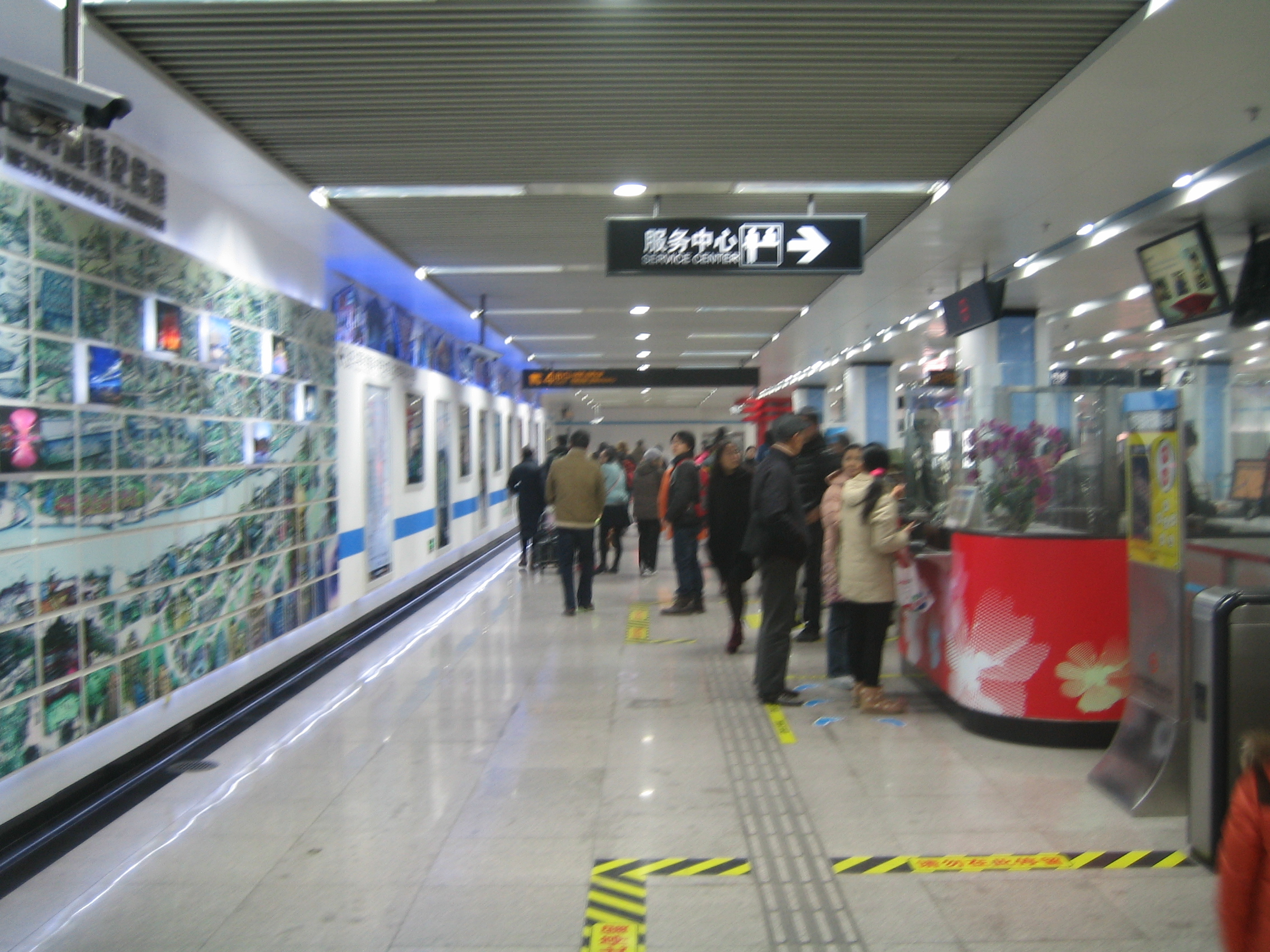
Line 8 concourse of China Art Museum

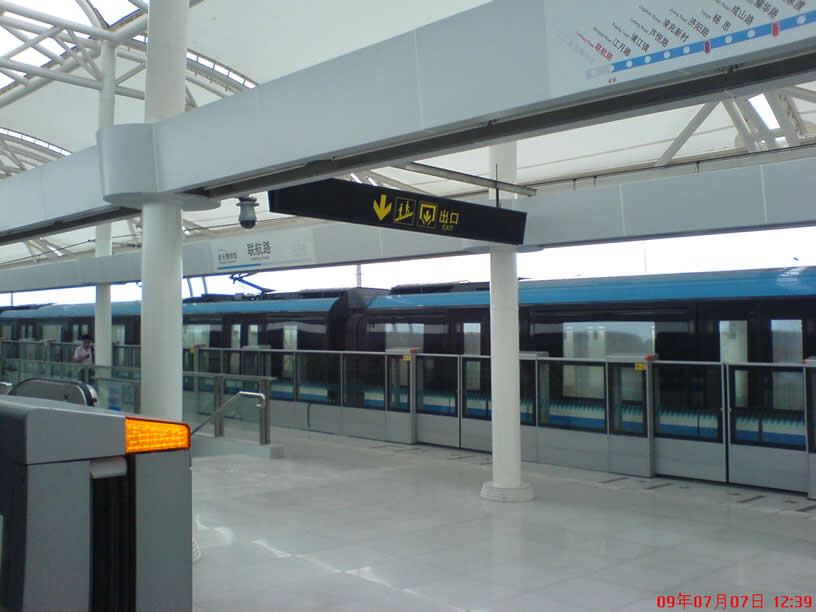
Line 8 platform of Lianhang Road

== Line 9 ==
Service Routes			Station Name		Opened	Location	Platform Level	Type of Platform	Transfers
Mainline	Rush hour		English	Chinese (S)	Opened	Location	Platform Level	Type of Platform	Transfers
●	●		Shanghai Songjiang Railway Station	上海松江站	30 December 2012	Songjiang	Underground	Island platform	Shanghai Songjiang
●	●		Zuibaichi Park	醉白池	30 December 2012	Songjiang	Underground	Island platform	
●	●		Songjiang Sports Center	松江体育中心	30 December 2012	Songjiang	Underground	Island platform	
●	●		Songjiang Xincheng	松江新城	29 December 2007	Songjiang	Underground	Island platform	
●	●		Songjiang University Town	松江大学城	29 December 2007	Songjiang	Elevated	Side platform	
●	●		Dongjing	洞泾	29 December 2007	Songjiang	Elevated	Side platform	
●	●	●	Sheshan	佘山	29 December 2007	Songjiang	Elevated	Island platform	
●	●	●	Sijing	泗泾	29 December 2007	Songjiang	Elevated	Side platform	
●	●	●	Jiuting	九亭	29 December 2007	Songjiang	Underground	Island platform	
●	●	●	Zhongchun Road	中春路	29 December 2007	Minhang	Underground	One side platform and one island platform	Airport Link
●	●	●	Qibao	七宝	29 December 2007	Minhang	Underground	Island platform	
●	●	●	Xingzhong Road	星中路	29 December 2007	Minhang	Underground	Island platform	
●	●	●	Hechuan Road	合川路	29 December 2007	Minhang	Underground	Island platform	
●	●	●	Caohejing Hi-Tech Park	漕河泾开发区	29 December 2007	Xuhui	Underground	Island platform	
●	●	●	Guilin Road	桂林路	29 December 2007	Xuhui	Underground	One side platform and one island platform	15
●	●	●	Yishan Road	宜山路	28 December 2008	Xuhui	Underground	Island platform	3 4
●	●	●	Xujiahui	徐家汇	31 December 2009	Xuhui	Underground	Island platform	1 11
●	●	●	Zhaojiabang Road	肇嘉浜路	31 December 2009	Xuhui	Underground	Island platform	7
●	●	●	Jiashan Road	嘉善路	31 December 2009	Xuhui	Underground	Island platform	12
●	●	●	Dapuqiao	打浦桥	31 December 2009	Huangpu	Underground	Island platform	
●	●	●	Madang Road	马当路	31 December 2009	Huangpu	Underground	Side platform	13
●	●	●	Lujiabang Road	陆家浜路	31 December 2009	Huangpu	Underground	Island platform	8
●	●	●	Xiaonanmen	小南门	31 December 2009	Huangpu	Underground	Island platform	
●	●	●	Shangcheng Road	商城路	31 December 2009	Pudong	Underground	Island platform	
●	●	●	Century Avenue	世纪大道	31 December 2009	Pudong	Underground	Island platform	2 4 6
●	●	●	Middle Yanggao Road	杨高中路	7 April 2010	Pudong	Underground	Island platform	18
●		●	Fangdian Road	芳甸路	30 December 2017	Pudong	Underground	Island platform	
●		●	Lantian Road	蓝天路	30 December 2017	Pudong	Underground	Island platform	14
●		●	Taierzhuang Road	台儿庄路	30 December 2017	Pudong	Underground	Island platform	
●		●	Jinqiao	金桥	30 December 2017	Pudong	Underground	Island platform	
●		●	Jinji Road	金吉路	30 December 2017	Pudong	Underground	Island platform	
●		●	Jinhai Road	金海路	30 December 2017	Pudong	Underground	Island platform	12
●		●	Gutang Road	顾唐路	30 December 2017	Pudong	Underground	Island platform	
●		●	Minlei Road	民雷路	30 December 2017	Pudong	Underground	Island platform	
●		●	Caolu	曹路	30 December 2017	Pudong	Underground	Island platform	

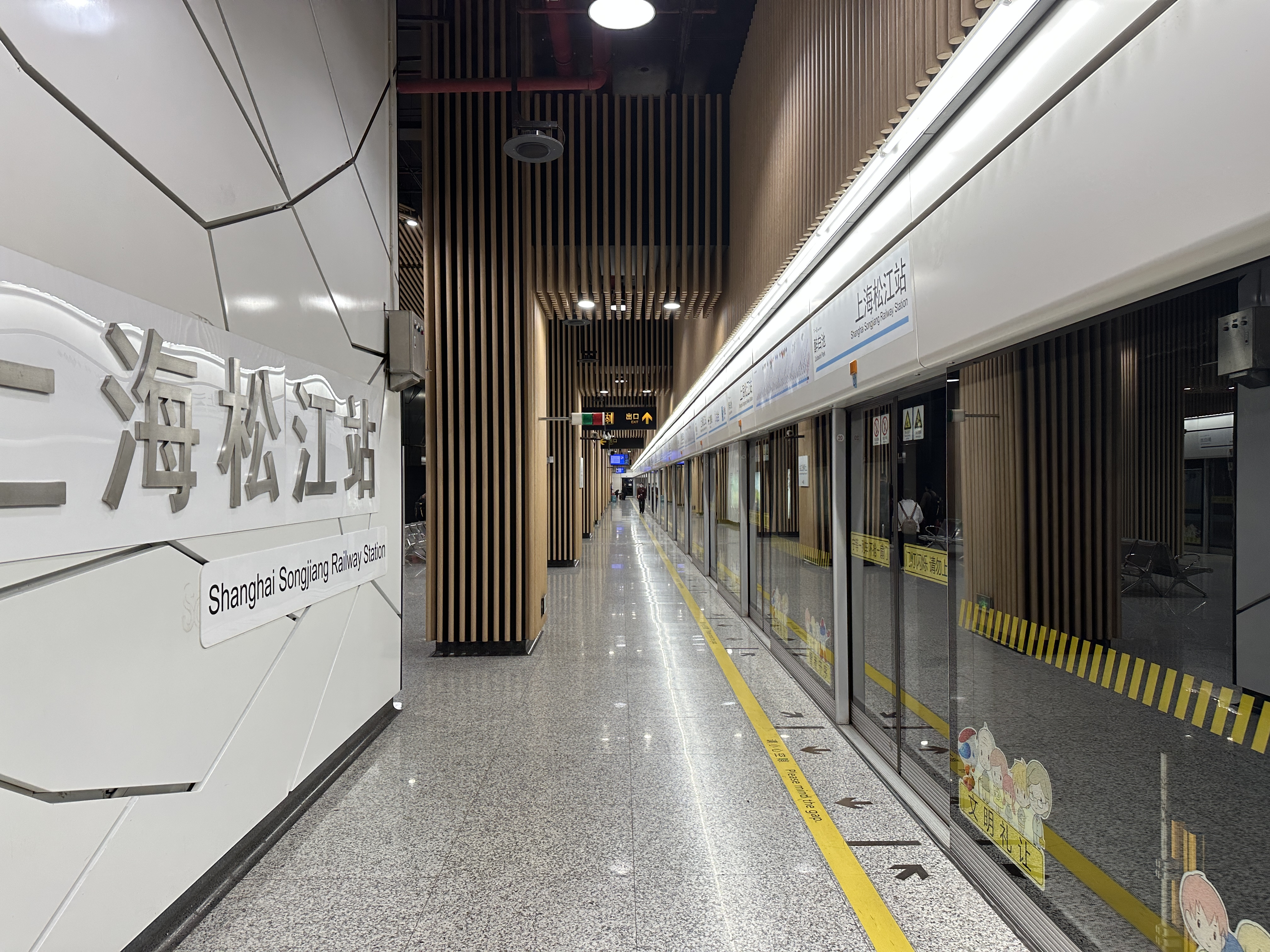
Line 9 platform of Shanghai Songjiang Railway Station

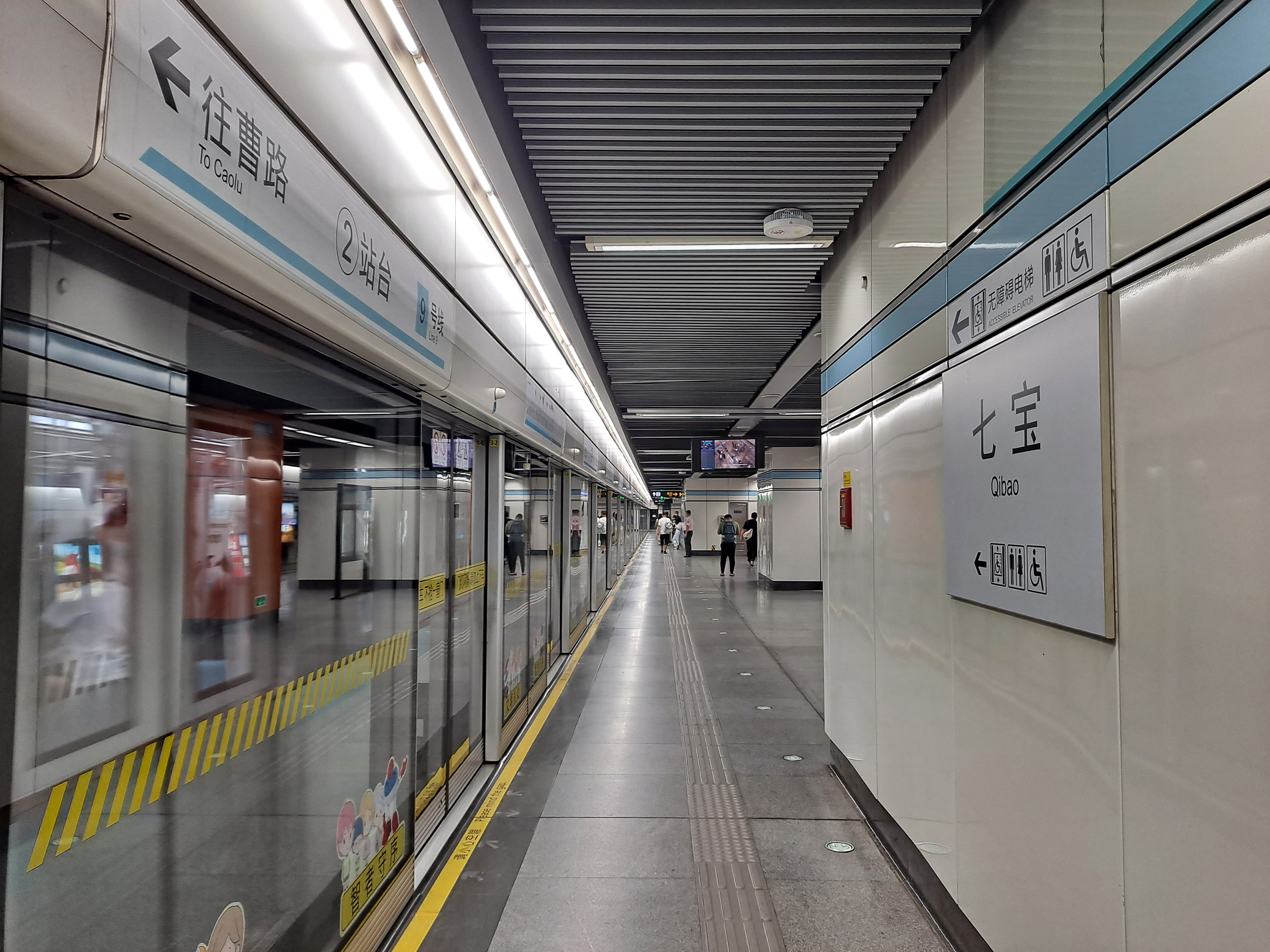
Line 9 platform of Qibao

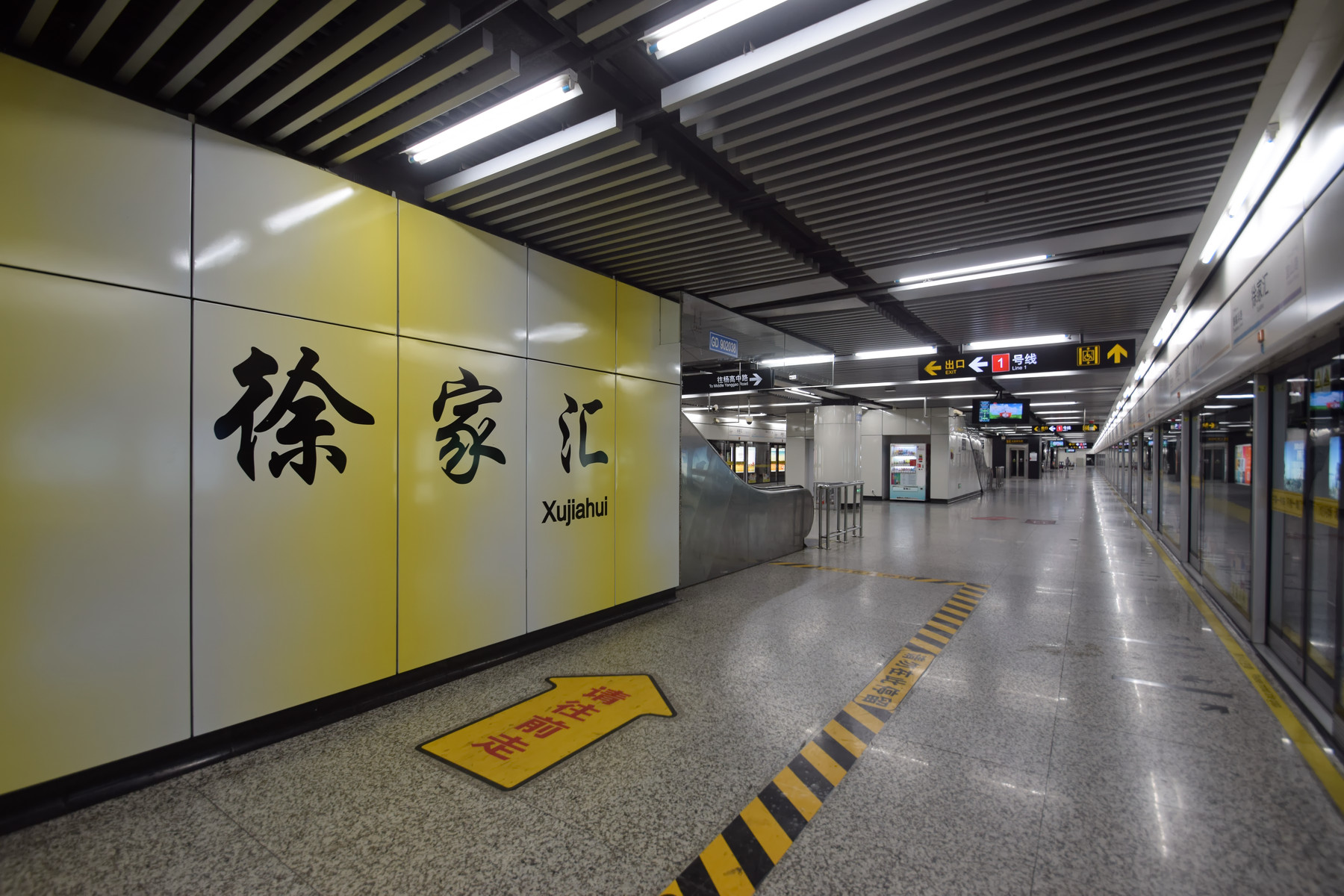
Line 9 platform of Xujiahui

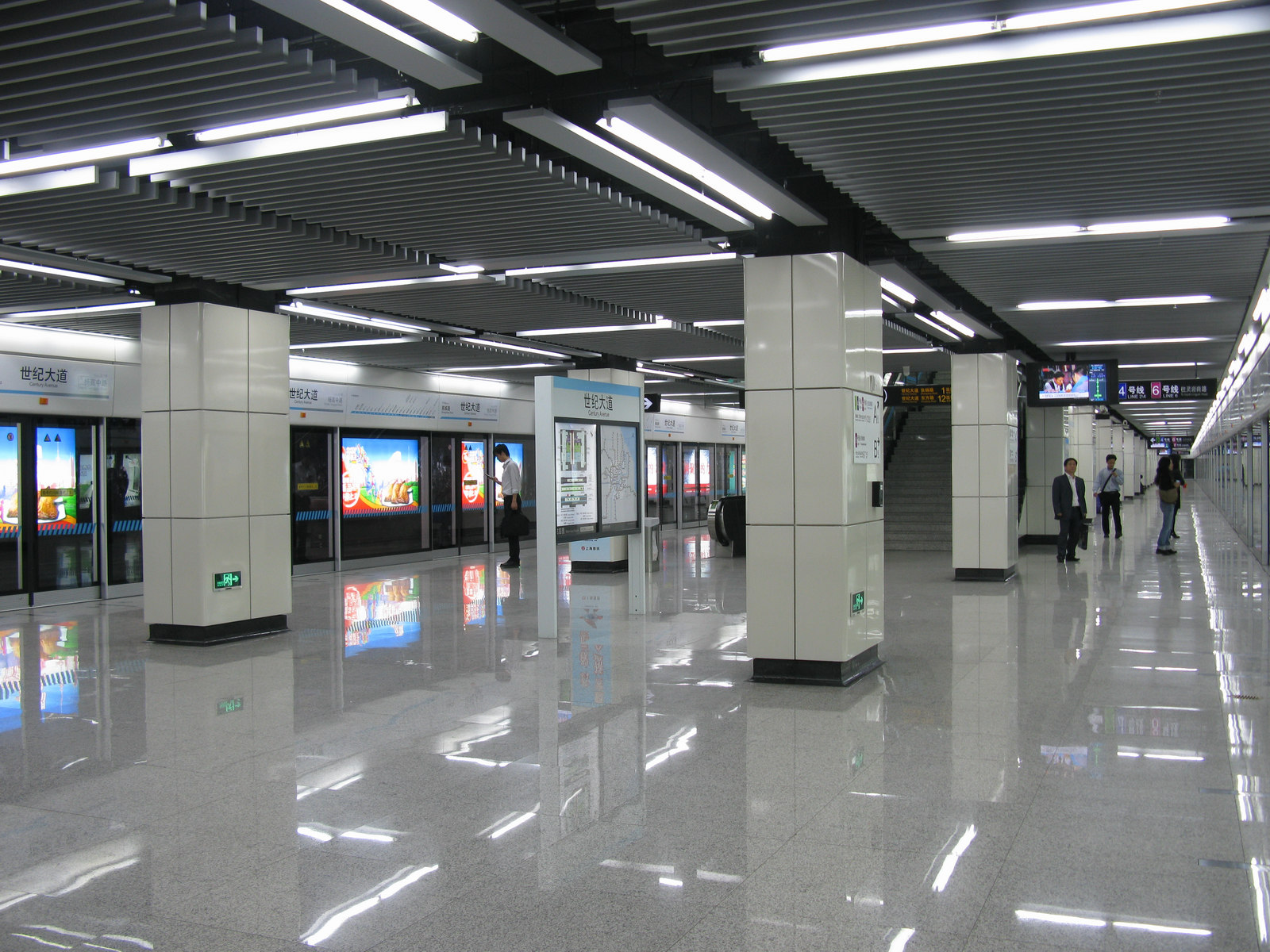
Line 9 platform of Century Avenue

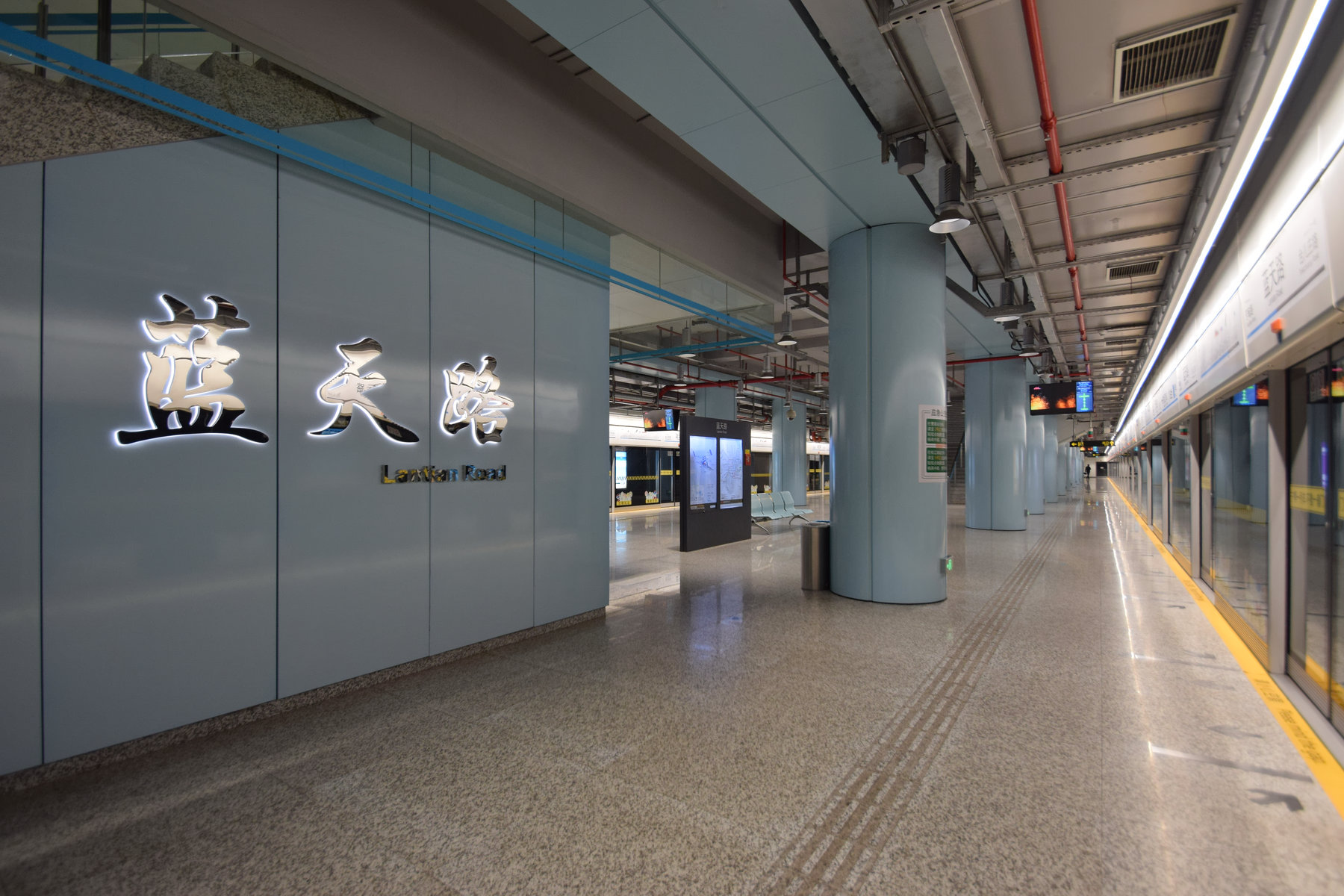
Line 9 platform of Lantian Road

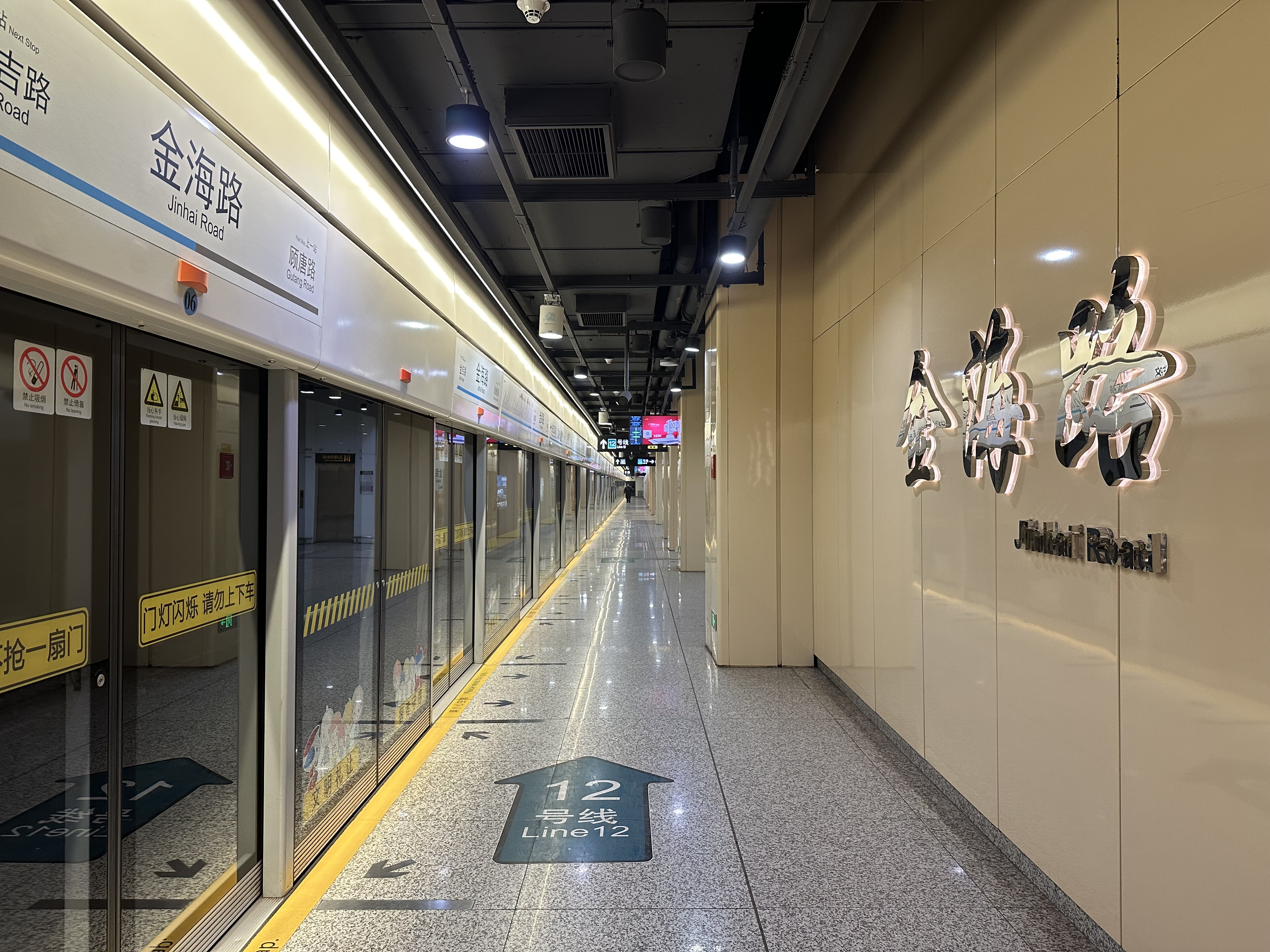
Line 9 platform of Jinhai Road

== Line 10 ==
Service Routes			Station Name		Opened	Location	Platform Level	Type of Platform	Transfers
Service Routes			English	Chinese (S)	Opened	Location	Platform Level	Type of Platform	Transfers
Branch
●			Hangzhong Road	航中路	10 April 2010	Minhang	Underground	Island platform	
●			Ziteng Road	紫藤路	10 April 2010	Minhang	Underground	Island platform	
●			Longbai Xincun	龙柏新村	10 April 2010	Minhang	Underground	Island platform	
Mainline
｜	●	●	Hongqiao Railway Station	虹桥火车站	30 November 2010	Minhang	Underground	Island platform	2 17; Airport Link; Hongqiao
｜	●	●	Hongqiao Airport Terminal 2	虹桥2号航站楼	30 November 2010	Minhang	Underground	Triple island platform	2 (Note: Virtual transfer from and to Hongqiao Railway Station-bound trains only – passengers who hold the Shanghai Public Transportation Card and transfer within 30 minutes of exiting the station are able to transfer to other lines without exiting the system.); Airport Link
｜	●	●	Hongqiao Airport Terminal 1	虹桥1号航站楼	30 November 2010	Changning	Underground	Island platform	
｜	●	●	Shanghai Zoo	上海动物园	30 November 2010	Changning	Underground	Island platform	
●	●	●	Longxi Road	龙溪路	10 April 2010	Changning	Underground	One side platform and one island platform	
●	●	●	Shuicheng Road	水城路	10 April 2010	Changning	Underground	Island platform	
●	●	●	Yili Road	伊犁路	10 April 2010	Changning	Underground	Island platform	
●	●	●	Songyuan Road	宋园路	10 April 2010	Changning	Underground	Side platform	
●	●	●	Hongqiao Road	虹桥路	10 April 2010	Changning	Underground	Island platform	3 4
●	●	●	Jiao Tong University	交通大学	10 April 2010	Xuhui	Underground	Island platform	11
●	●	●	Shanghai Library	上海图书馆	10 April 2010	Xuhui	Underground	Island platform	
●	●	●	South Shaanxi Road	陕西南路	10 April 2010	Huangpu	Underground	Island platform	1 12
●	●	●	Site of the First CPC National Congress · Xintiandi	一大会址·新天地	10 April 2010	Huangpu	Underground	Side platform	13
●	●	●	Laoximen	老西门	10 April 2010	Huangpu	Underground	Island platform	8
●	●	●	Yuyuan Garden	豫园	10 April 2010	Huangpu	Underground	Island platform	14
●	●	●	East Nanjing Road	南京东路	10 April 2010	Huangpu	Underground	Island platform	2
●	●	●	Tiantong Road	天潼路	10 April 2010	Hongkou/Jing'an	Underground	Island platform	12
●	●	●	North Sichuan Road	四川北路	10 April 2010	Hongkou	Underground	Side platform	
●	●	●	Hailun Road	海伦路	10 April 2010	Hongkou	Underground	Island platform	4
●	●	●	Youdian Xincun	邮电新村	10 April 2010	Hongkou	Underground	Side platform	
●	●	●	Siping Road	四平路	10 April 2010	Yangpu/Hongkou	Underground	Side platform	8
●	●	●	Tongji University	同济大学	10 April 2010	Yangpu	Underground	Island platform	
●	●	●	Guoquan Road	国权路	10 April 2010	Yangpu	Underground	Island platform	18
●	●	●	Wujiaochang	五角场	10 April 2010	Yangpu	Underground	Island platform	
●	●	●	Jiangwan Stadium	江湾体育场	10 April 2010	Yangpu	Underground	Island platform	
●		●	Sanmen Road	三门路	10 April 2010	Yangpu	Underground	Island platform	
●		●	East Yingao Road	殷高东路	10 April 2010	Yangpu	Underground	Island platform	
●		●	Xinjiangwancheng	新江湾城	10 April 2010	Yangpu	Underground	Double island platform	
		●	Guofan Road	国帆路	26 December 2020	Yangpu	Underground	Island platform	
		●	Shuangjiang Road	双江路	26 December 2020	Pudong	Elevated	Side platform	
		●	West Gaoqiao	高桥西	26 December 2020	Pudong	Elevated	Side platform	
		●	Gaoqiao	高桥	26 December 2020	Pudong	Elevated	Side platform	
		●	Gangcheng Road	港城路	26 December 2020	Pudong	Elevated	Side platform	6
		●	Jilong Road	基隆路	26 December 2020	Pudong	Elevated	Side platform	

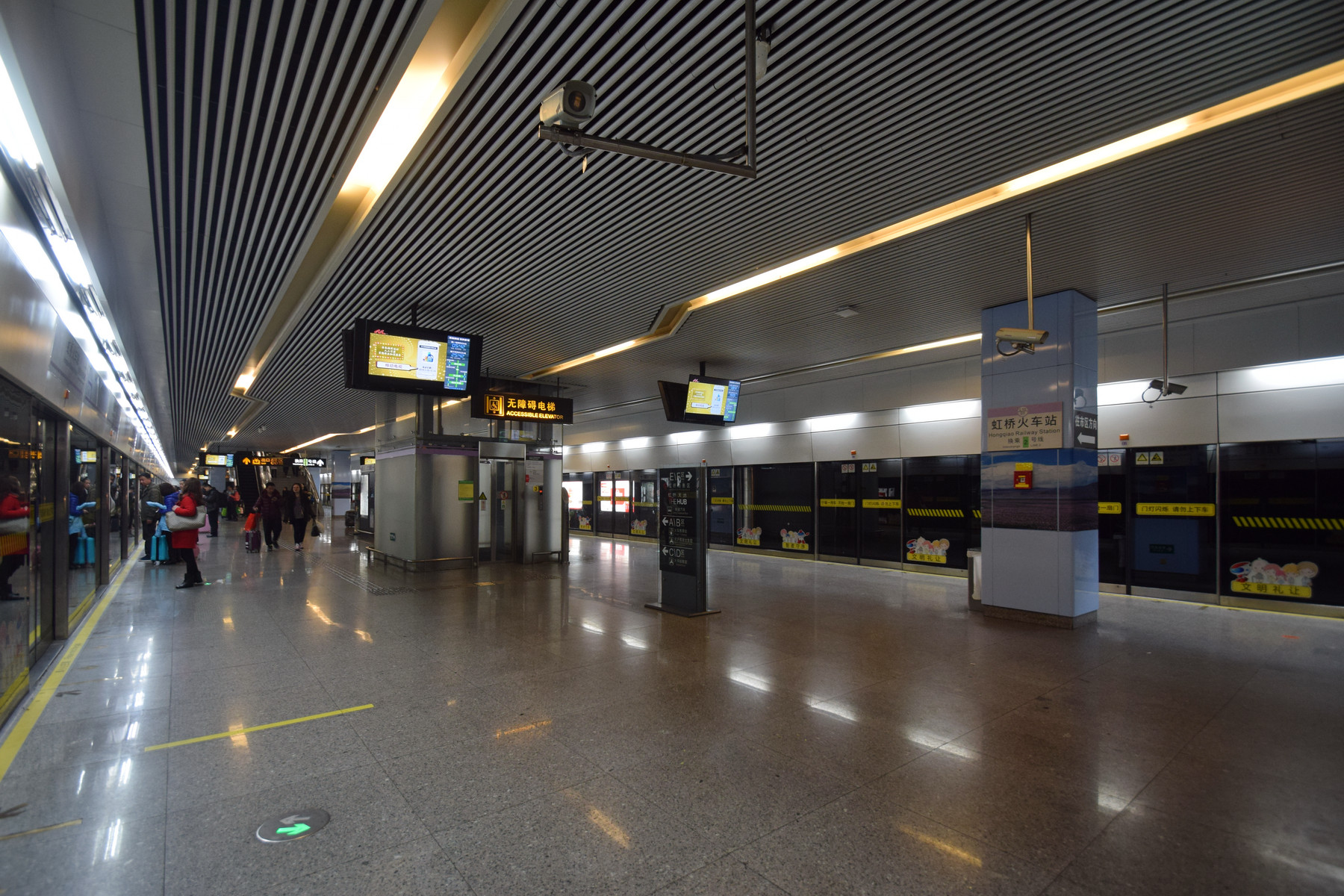
Line 10 platform of Hongqiao Railway Station

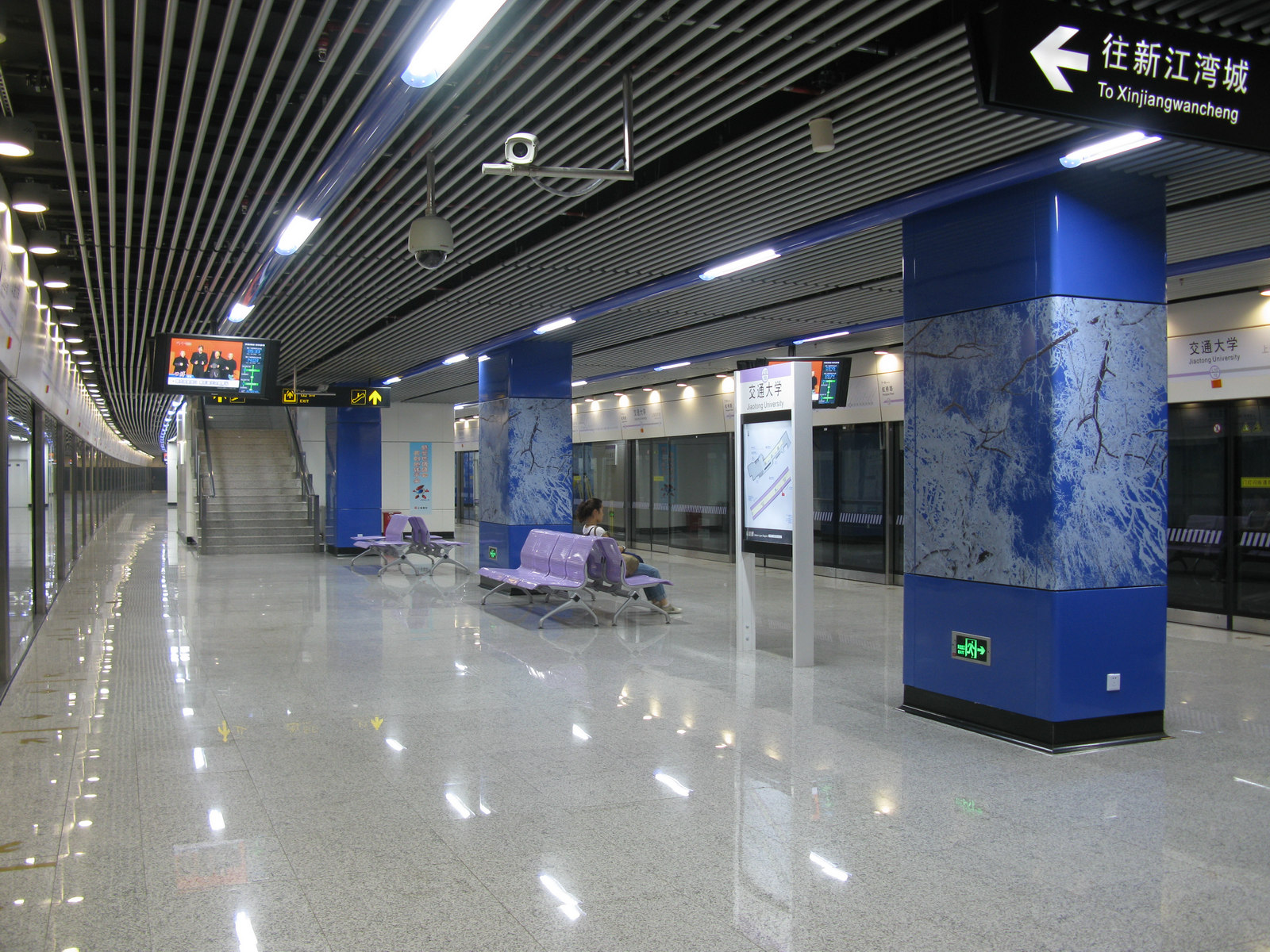
Line 10 platform of Jiao Tong University

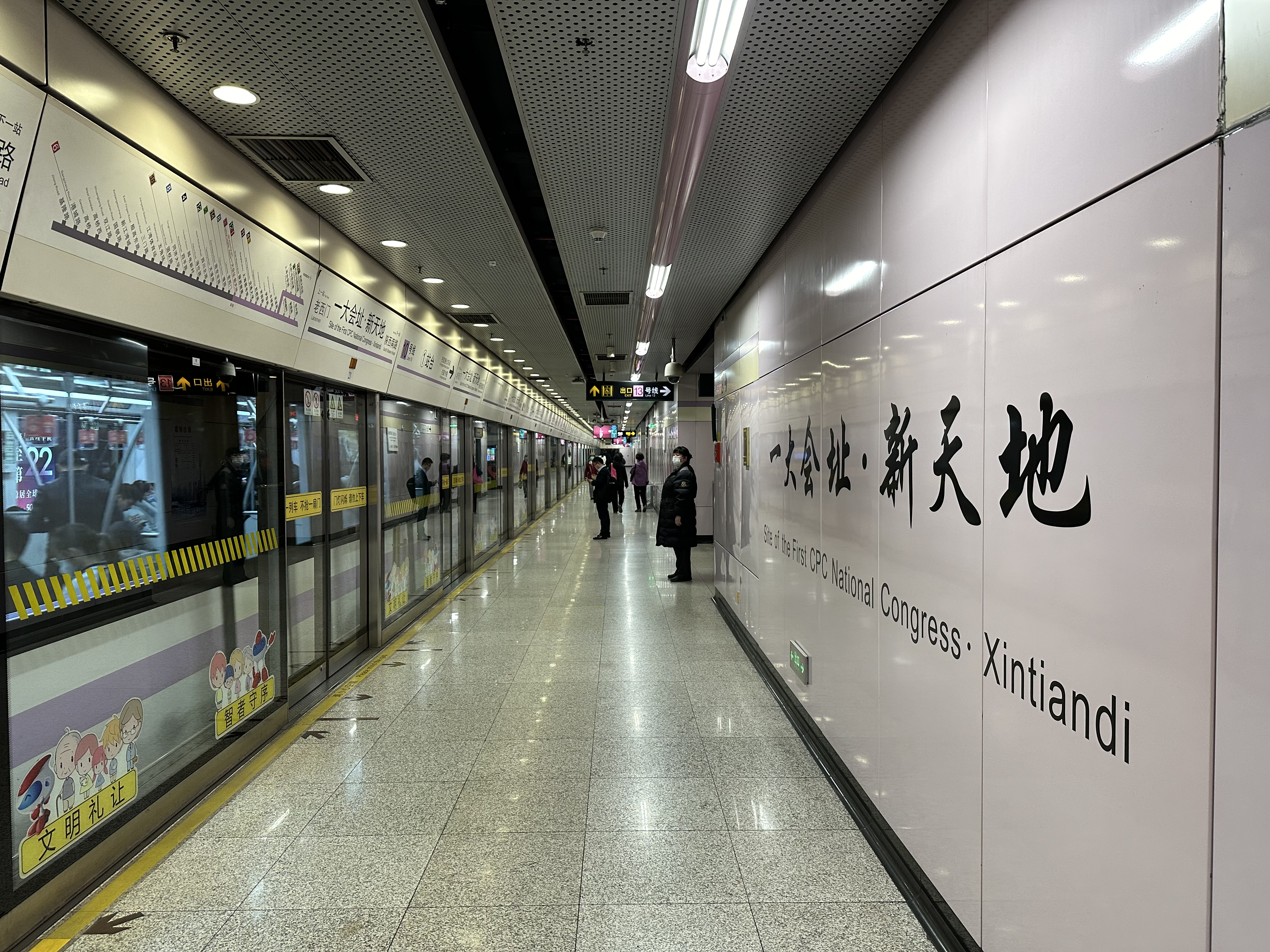
Line 10 platform of Site of the First CPC National Congress · Xintiandi

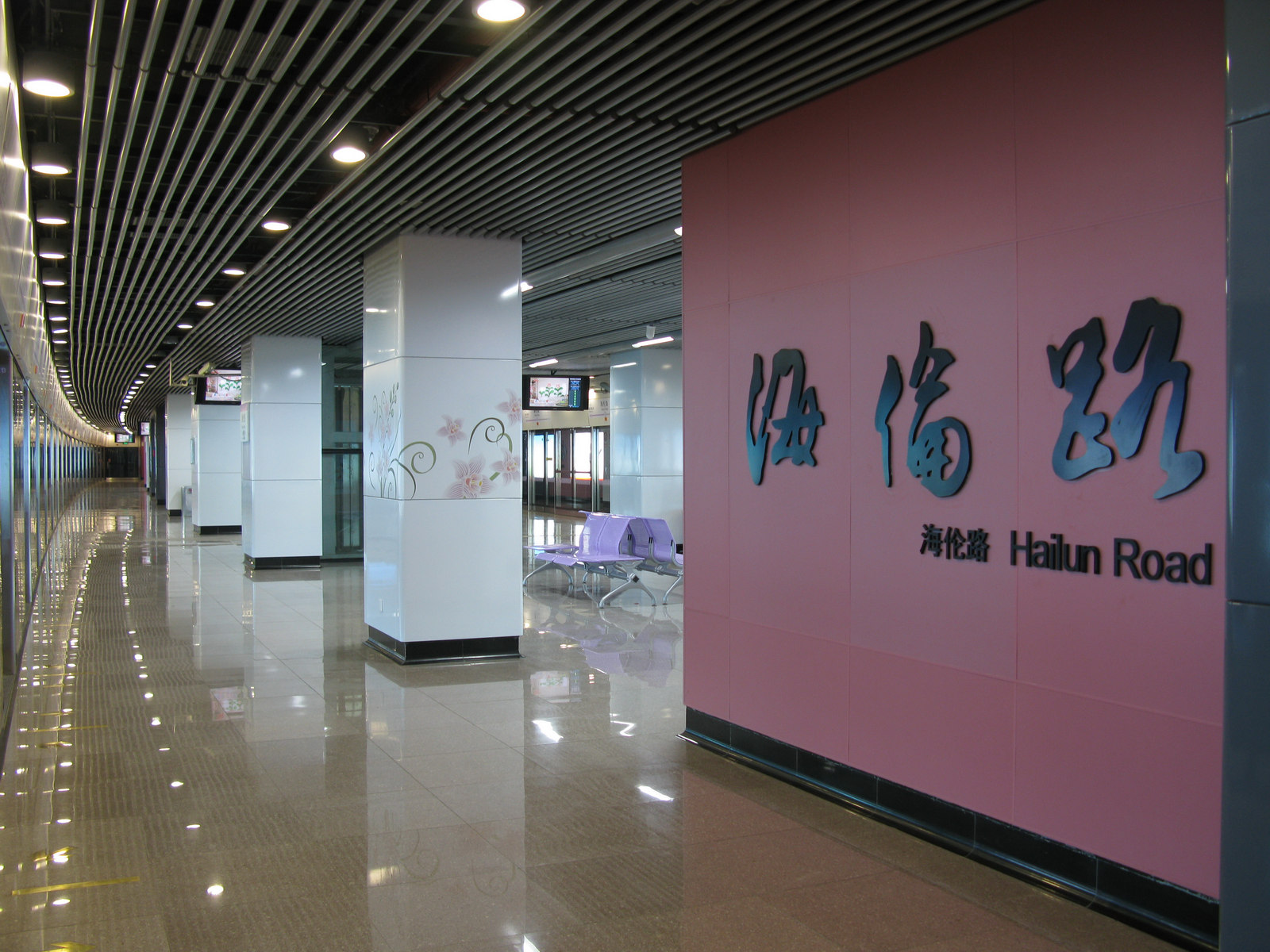
Line 10 platform of Hailun Road

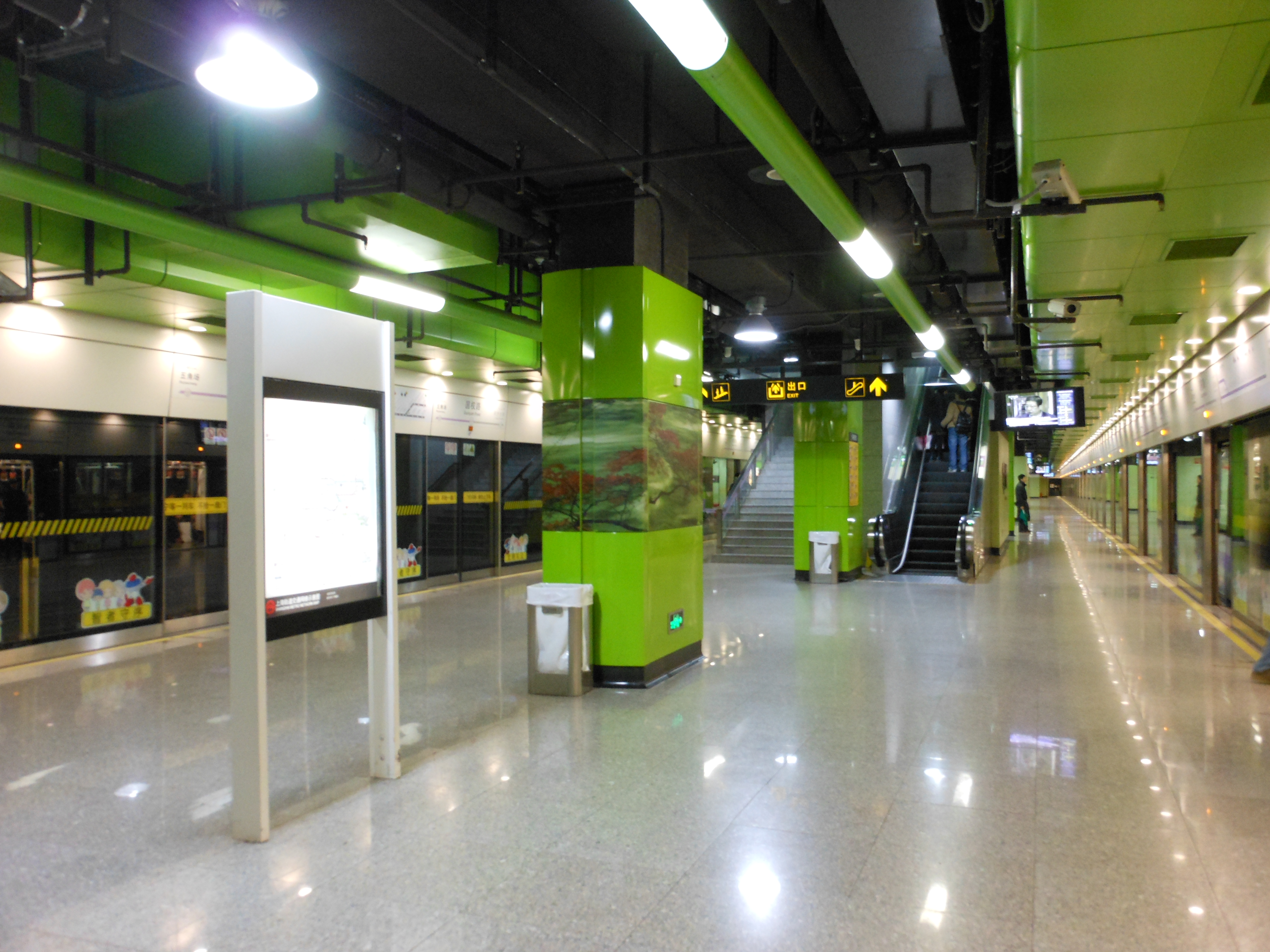
Line 10 platform of Guoquan Road

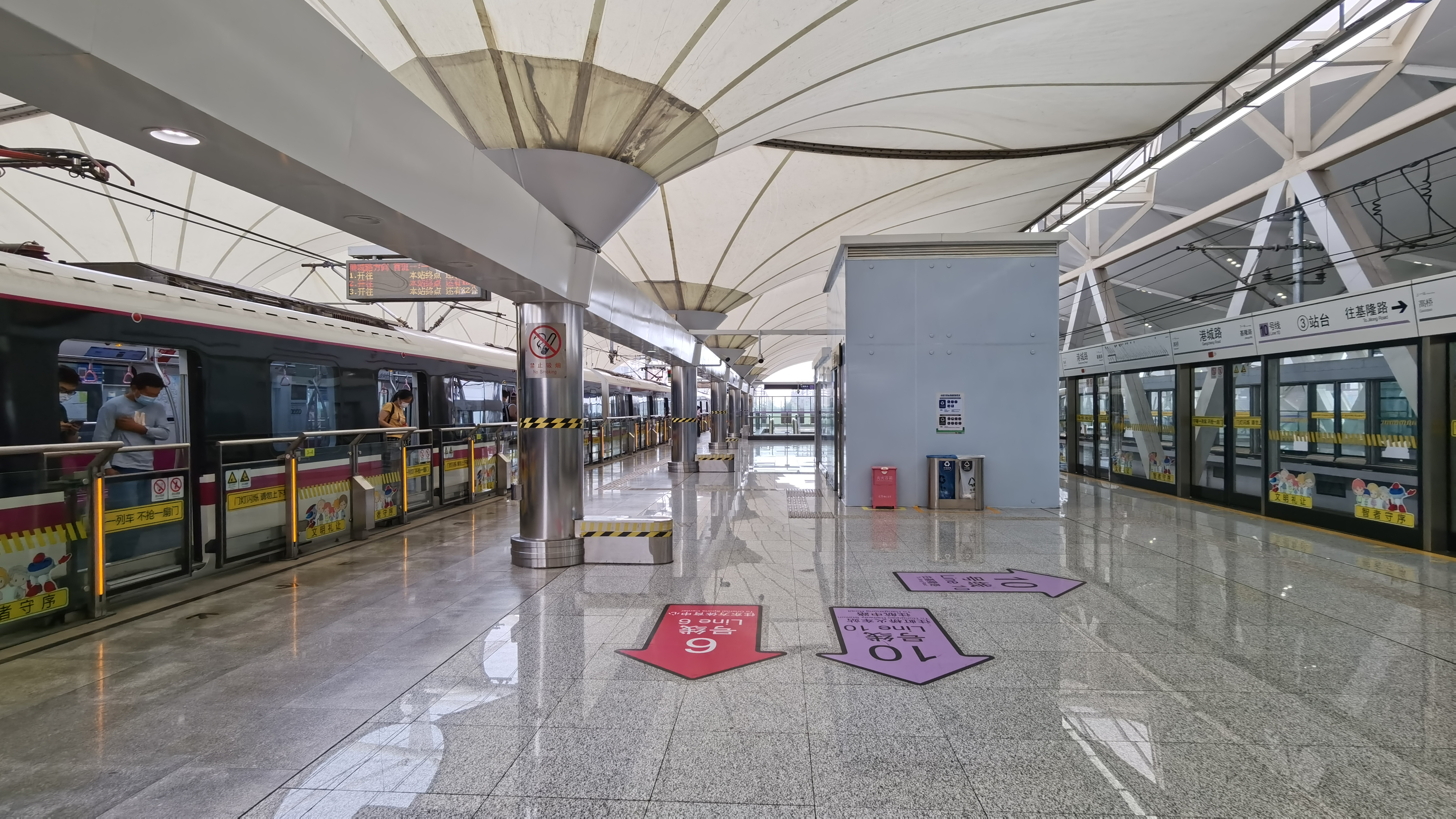
Platform 2&3 of Gangcheng Road

== Line 11 ==
Service Routes		Station Name		Opened	Location	Platform Level	Type of Platform	Transfers
Service Routes		English	Chinese (S)	Opened	Location	Platform Level	Type of Platform	Transfers
Mainline
●		Disney Resort	迪士尼	26 April 2016	Pudong	Underground	Island platform	
●		Kangxin Highway	康新公路	19 December 2015	Pudong	Elevated	Side platform	
●		Xiuyan Road	秀沿路	19 December 2015	Pudong	Elevated	Side platform	
●		Luoshan Road	罗山路	31 August 2013	Pudong	Elevated	Island platform	16
●		Yuqiao	御桥	31 August 2013	Pudong	Underground	Island platform	18
●		Kangheng Road	康恒路	28 September 2024	Pudong	Underground	Island platform	
●		Pusan Road	浦三路	31 August 2013	Pudong	Underground	Side platform	
●		East Sanlin	三林东	31 August 2013	Pudong	Underground	Island platform	
●	●	Sanlin	三林	31 August 2013	Pudong	Underground	Double island platform	
●	●	Oriental Sports Center	东方体育中心	31 August 2013	Pudong	Underground	Double island platform	6 8
●	●	Longyao Road	龙耀路	31 August 2013	Xuhui	Underground	Island platform	
●	●	Yunjin Road	云锦路	31 August 2013	Xuhui	Underground	Island platform	
●	●	Longhua	龙华	31 August 2013	Xuhui	Underground	Island platform	12
●	●	Shanghai Swimming Center	上海游泳馆	31 August 2013	Xuhui	Underground	Island platform	
●	●	Xujiahui	徐家汇	31 August 2013	Xuhui	Underground	Island platform	1 9
●	●	Jiao Tong University	交通大学	31 August 2013	Xuhui	Underground	Island platform	10
●	●	Jiangsu Road	江苏路	31 December 2009	Changning	Underground	Island platform	2
●	●	Longde Road	隆德路	31 December 2009	Putuo	Underground	Island platform	13
●	●	Caoyang Road	曹杨路	31 December 2009	Putuo	Underground	Double-level side platform (Note: The platform structure is actually a double island platform but the other platform has not yet opened.)	3 4 14
●	●	Fengqiao Road	枫桥路	31 December 2009	Putuo	Underground	Island platform	
●	●	Zhenru	真如	31 December 2009	Putuo	Underground	One side platform and one island platform	
●	●	Shanghai West Railway Station	上海西站	31 December 2009	Putuo	Underground	Island platform	15 Shanghaixi
●	●	Liziyuan	李子园	31 December 2009	Putuo	Underground	Island platform	
●	●	Qilianshan Road	祁连山路	31 December 2009	Putuo	Underground	Island platform	
●	●	Wuwei Road	武威路	31 December 2009	Putuo	Underground	Island platform	
●	●	Taopu Xincun	桃浦新村	31 December 2009	Putuo	Underground	Island platform	
●	●	Nanxiang	南翔	31 December 2009	Jiading	Elevated	One side platform and one island platform	
●	●	Chenxiang Highway	陈翔公路	25 August 2020	Jiading	Elevated	Side platform	
●	●	Malu	马陆	31 December 2009	Jiading	Elevated	Side platform	
●	●	Jiading Xincheng	嘉定新城	31 December 2009	Jiading	Elevated	One side platform and one island platform	
●	｜	Baiyin Road	白银路	31 December 2009	Jiading	Elevated	Side platform	
●	｜	West Jiading	嘉定西	31 December 2009	Jiading	Elevated	Island platform	
●	｜	North Jiading	嘉定北	31 December 2009	Jiading	Elevated	Side platform	
Branch
	●	Shanghai Circuit	上海赛车场	29 March 2010	Jiading	Underground	Side platform	
	●	East Changji Road	昌吉东路	26 April 2011	Jiading	At-grade	Side platform	
	●	Shanghai Automobile City	上海汽车城	29 March 2010	Jiading	Elevated	Side platform	
	●	Anting	安亭	29 March 2010	Jiading	Elevated	Island platform	
	●	Zhaofeng Road	兆丰路	16 October 2013	Kunshan, Jiangsu	Elevated	Island platform	
	●	Guangming Road	光明路	16 October 2013	Kunshan, Jiangsu	Elevated	Side platform	
	●	Huaqiao	花桥	16 October 2013	Kunshan, Jiangsu	Elevated	Side platform	11 (Suzhou Rail Transit)

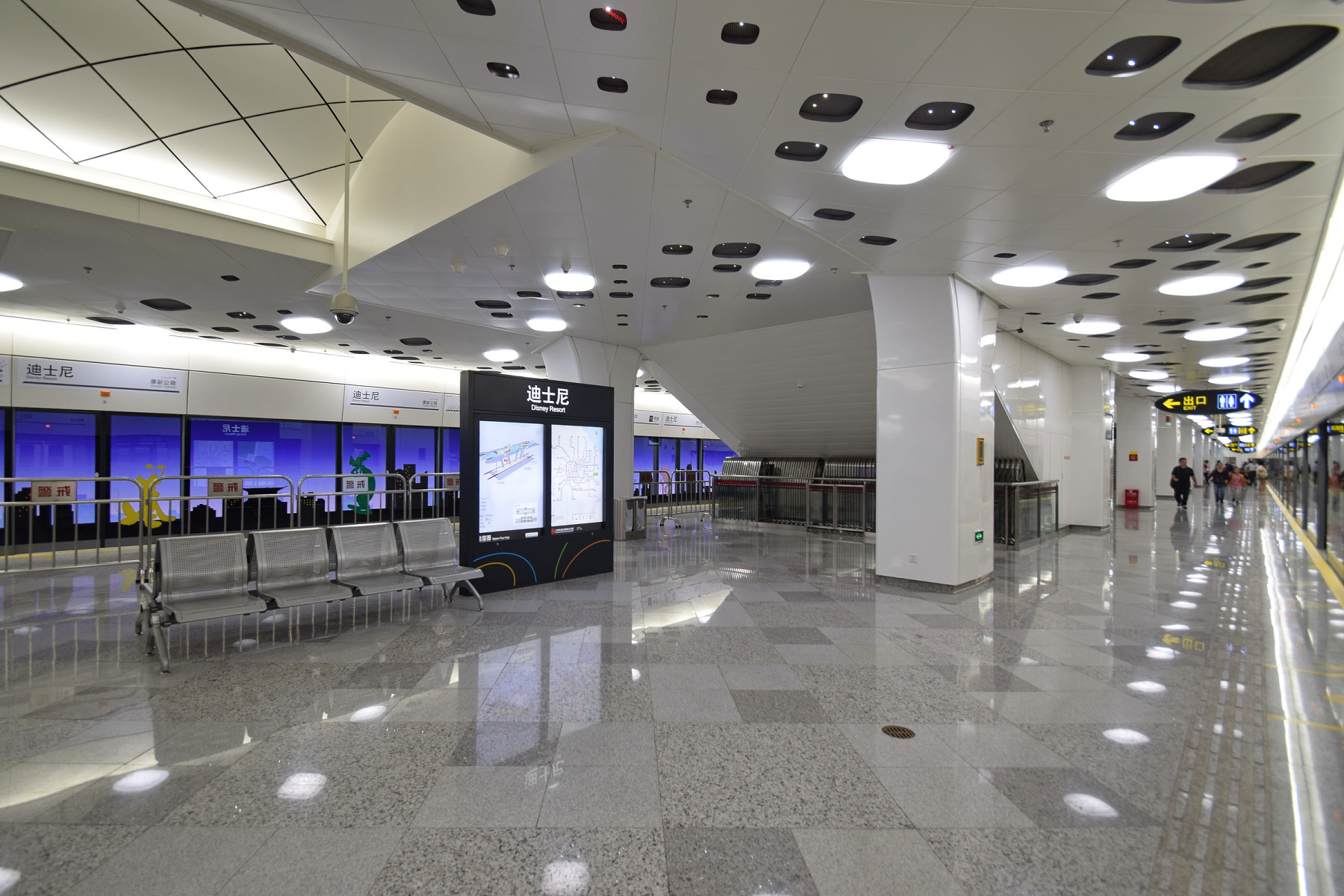
Line 11 platform of Disney Resort

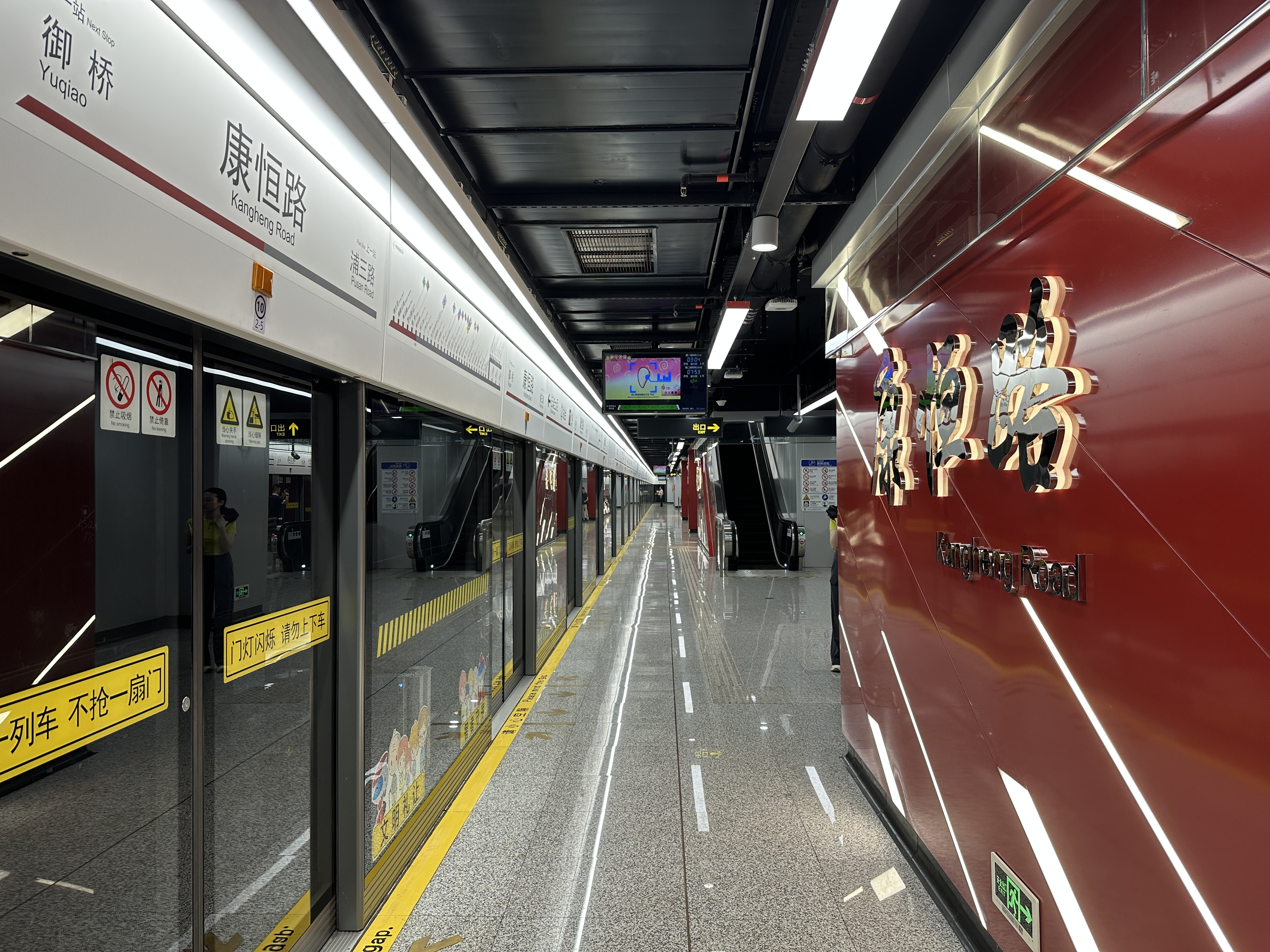
Line 11 platform of Kangheng Road

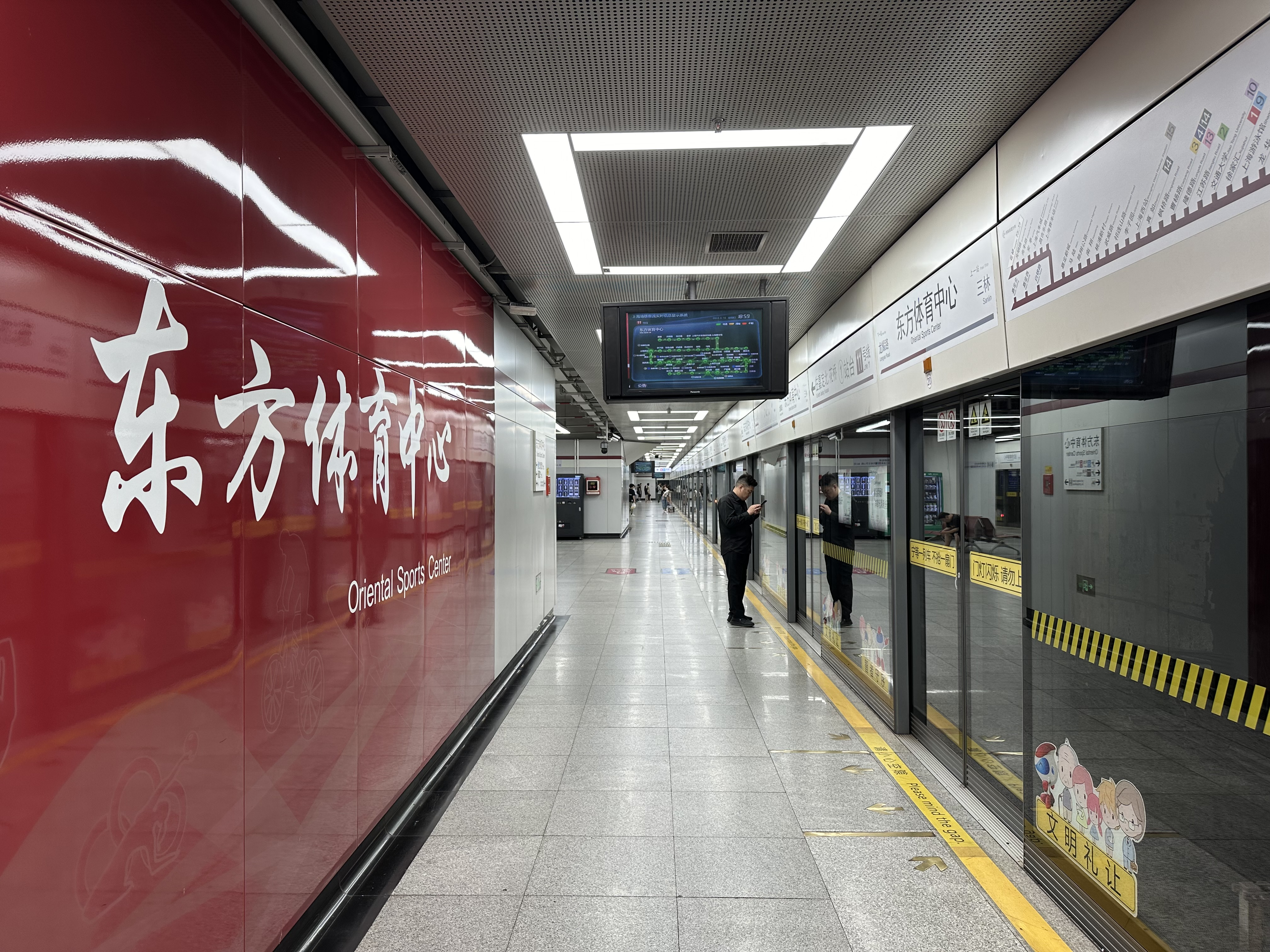
Line 11 northbound platform of Oriental Sports Center

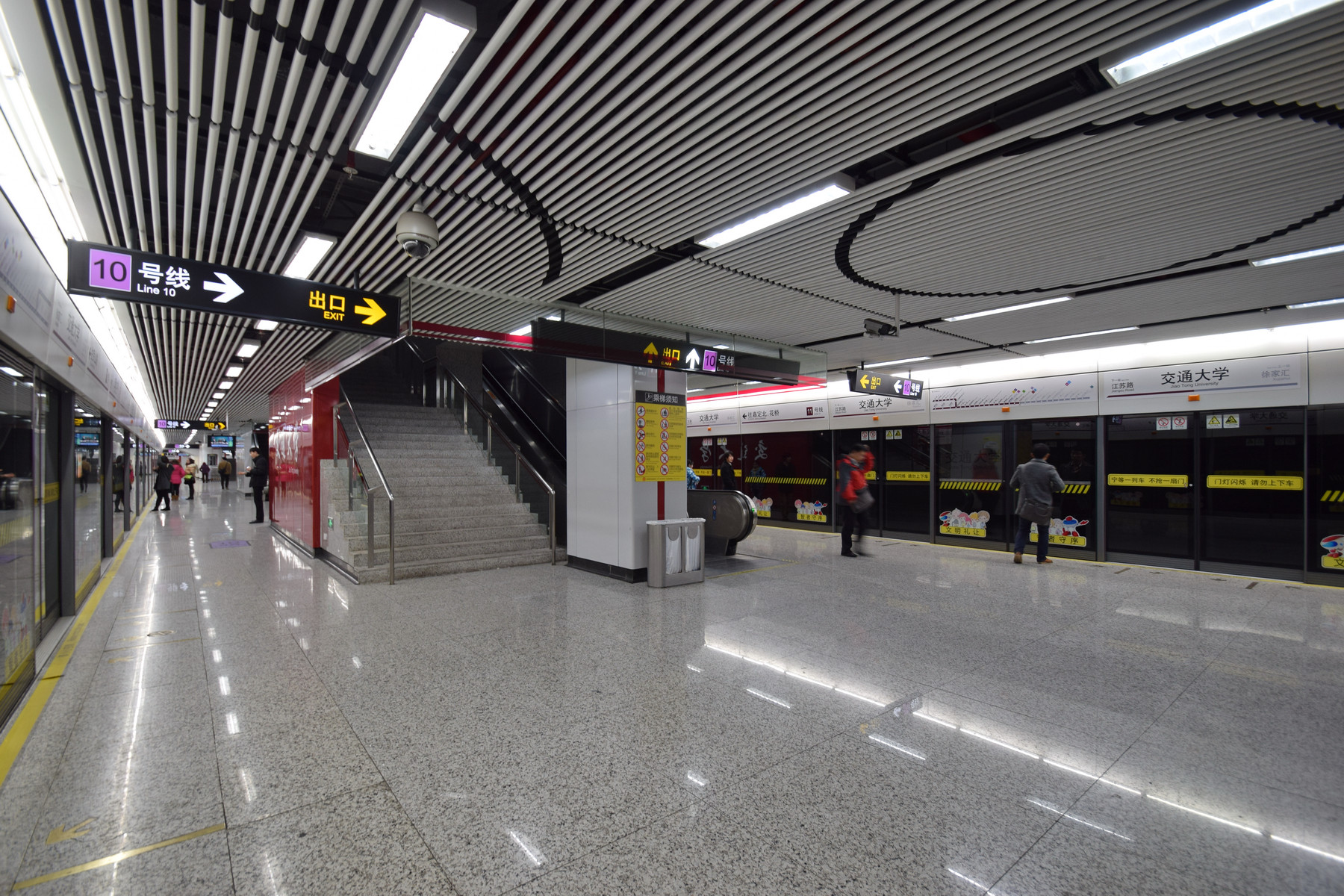
Line 11 platform of Jiao Tong University

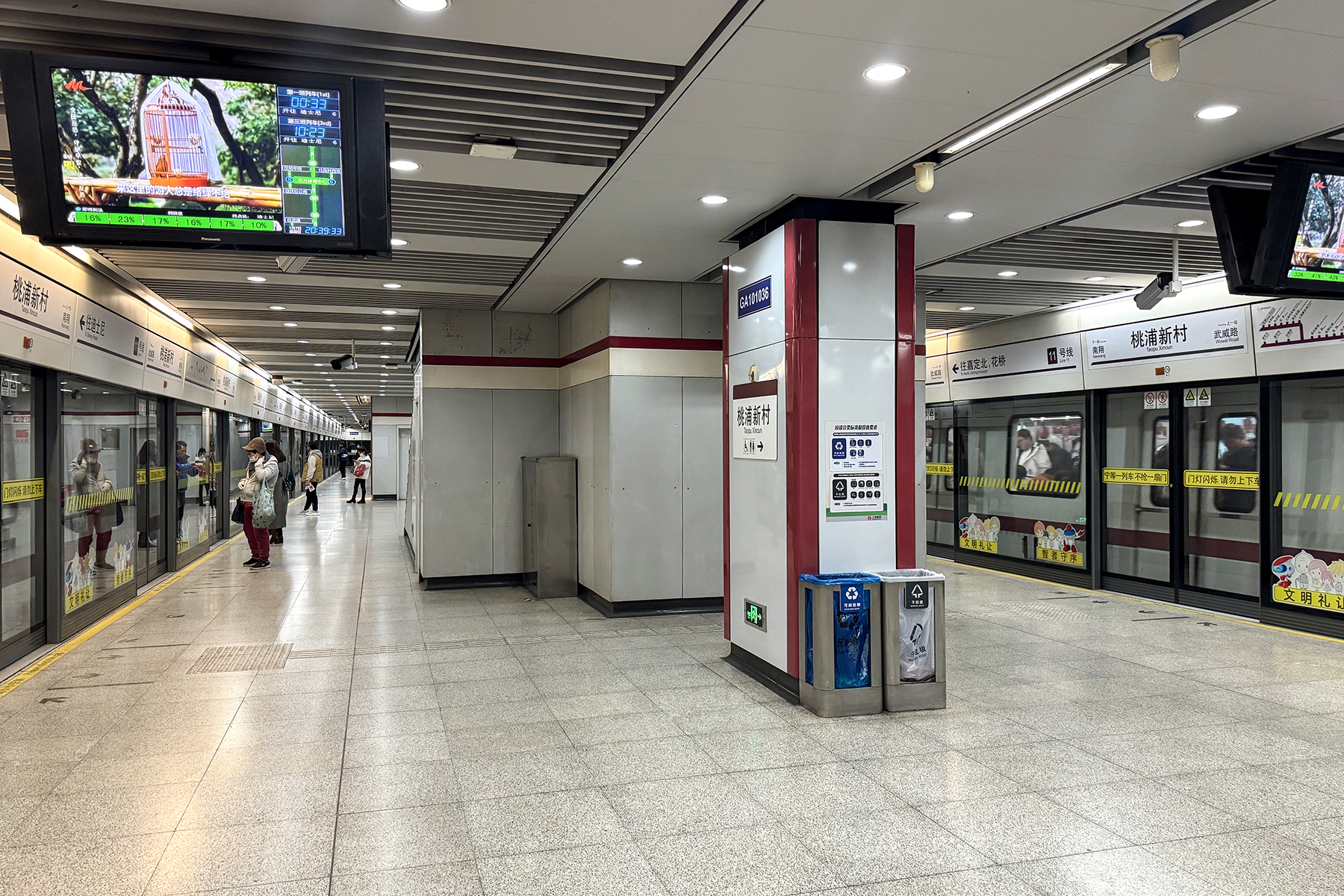
Line 11 platform of Taopu Xincun

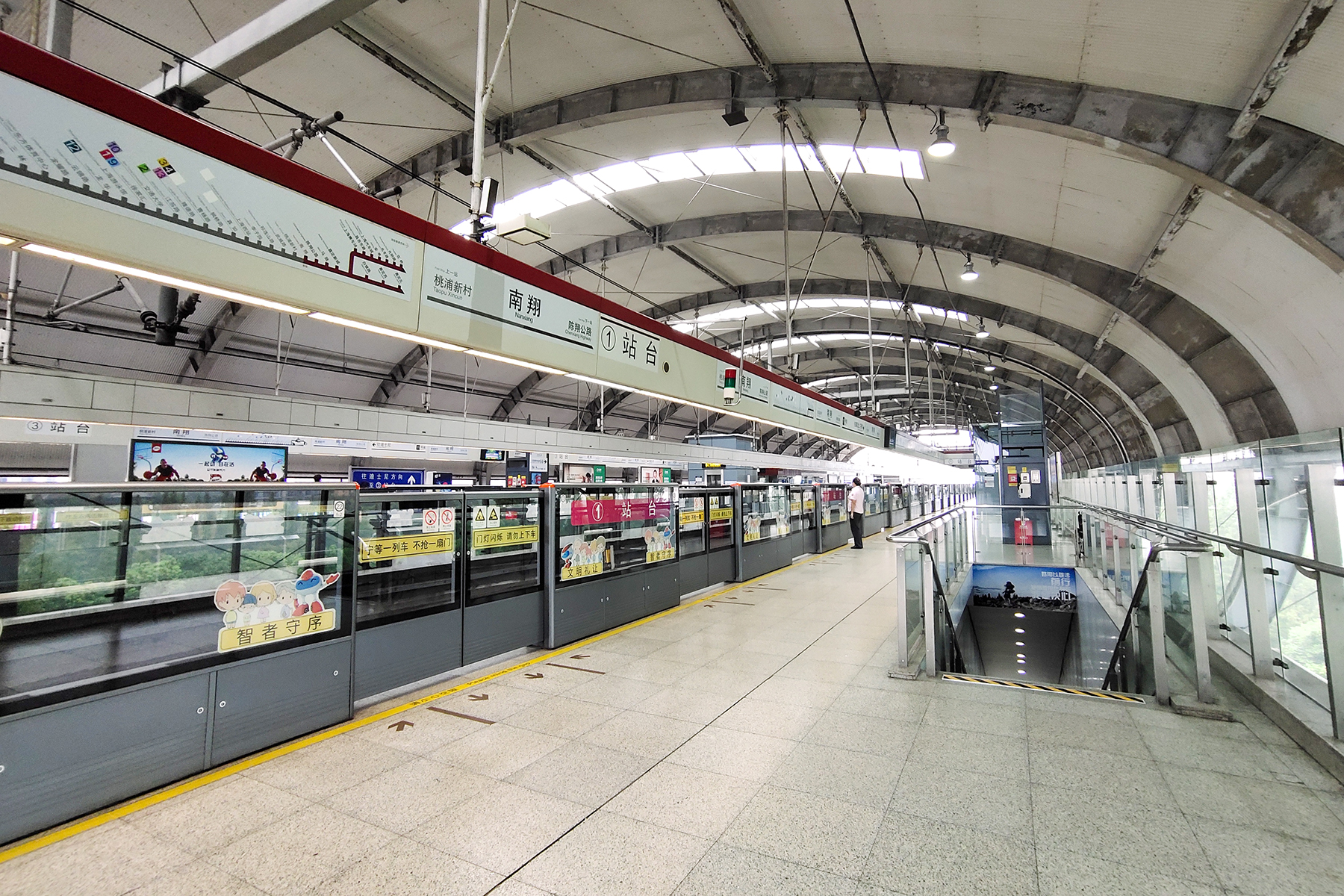
Platform 1 of Nanxiang

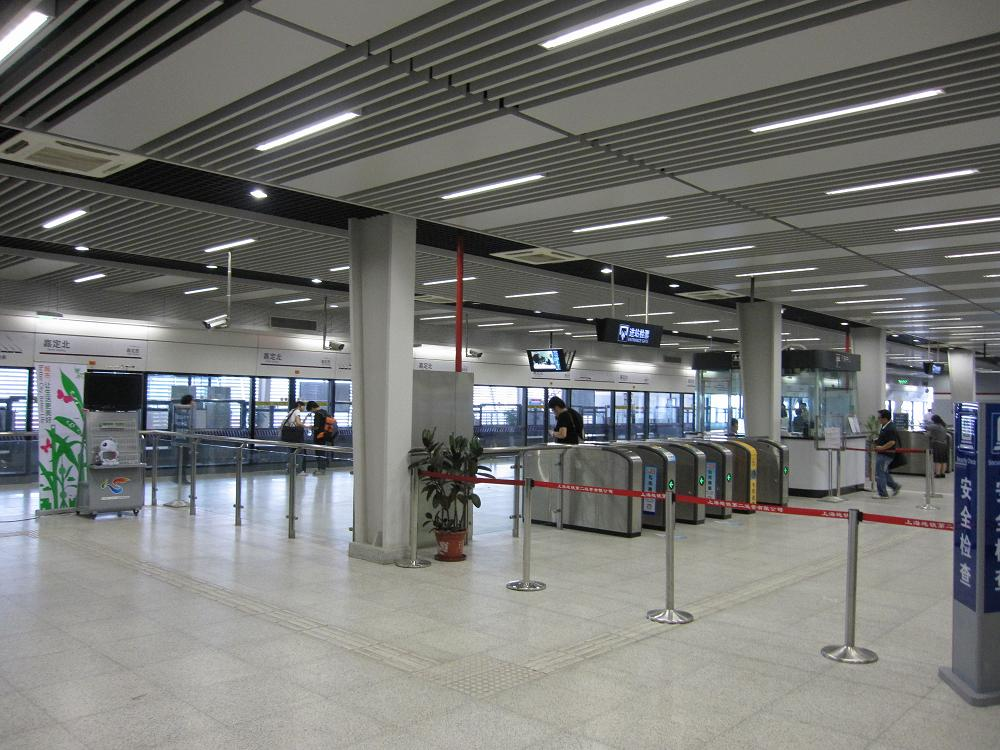
Line 11 concourse of North Jiading

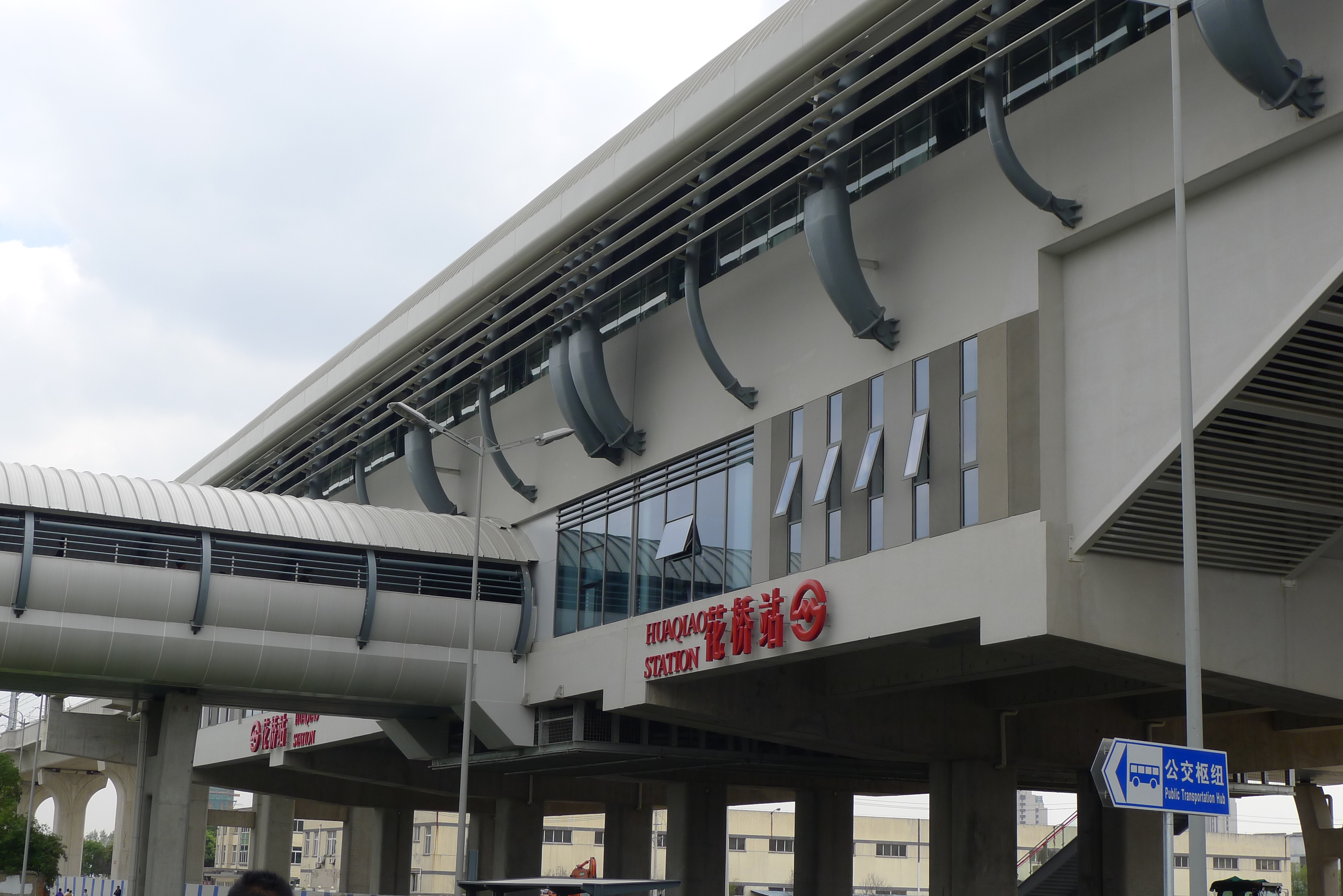
Line 11 Huaqiao station exterior

== Line 12 ==
Service Routes		Station Name		Opened	Location	Platform Level	Type of Platform	Transfers
Service Routes		English	Chinese (S)	Opened	Location	Platform Level	Type of Platform	Transfers
●		Jinhai Road	金海路	29 December 2013	Pudong	Underground	Side platform	9
●		Shenjiang Road	申江路	29 December 2013	Pudong	Underground	Island platform	
●		Jinjing Road	金京路	29 December 2013	Pudong	Underground	Island platform	
●		North Yanggao Road	杨高北路	29 December 2013	Pudong	Underground	Island platform	
●	●	Jufeng Road	巨峰路	29 December 2013	Pudong	Underground	Island platform	6
●	●	Donglu Road	东陆路	29 December 2013	Pudong	Underground	Island platform	
●	●	Fuxing Island	复兴岛	29 December 2013	Yangpu	Underground	Island platform	
●	●	Aiguo Road	爱国路	29 December 2013	Yangpu	Underground	Island platform	
●	●	Longchang Road	隆昌路	29 December 2013	Yangpu	Underground	Side platform	
●	●	Ningguo Road	宁国路	29 December 2013	Yangpu	Underground	Island platform	
●	●	Jiangpu Park	江浦公园	29 December 2013	Yangpu	Underground	Island platform	18
●	●	Dalian Road	大连路	29 December 2013	Yangpu	Underground	Island platform	4
●	●	Tilanqiao	提篮桥	29 December 2013	Hongkou	Underground	Island platform	
●	●	International Cruise Terminal	国际客运中心	29 December 2013	Hongkou	Underground	Side platform	
●	●	Tiantong Road	天潼路	29 December 2013	Hongkou	Underground	Side platform	10
●	●	Qufu Road	曲阜路	10 May 2014	Jing'an	Underground	Island platform	8
●	●	Hanzhong Road	汉中路	19 December 2015	Jing'an	Underground	Island platform	1 13
●	●	West Nanjing Road	南京西路	19 December 2015	Jing'an	Underground	Island platform	2 13
●	●	South Shaanxi Road	陕西南路	19 December 2015	Huangpu	Underground	Island platform	1 10
●	●	Jiashan Road	嘉善路	19 December 2015	Xuhui	Underground	Island platform	9
●	●	Damuqiao Road	大木桥路	19 December 2015	Xuhui	Underground	Island platform	4
●	●	Middle Longhua Road	龙华中路	19 December 2015	Xuhui	Underground	Side platform	7
●	●	Longhua	龙华	19 December 2015	Xuhui	Underground	Island platform	11
●	●	Longcao Road	龙漕路	19 December 2015	Xuhui	Underground	Island platform	3
●	●	Caobao Road	漕宝路	19 December 2015	Xuhui	Underground	Island platform	1
●	●	Guilin Park	桂林公园	19 December 2015	Xuhui	Underground	Island platform	15
●	●	Hongcao Road	虹漕路	19 December 2015	Xuhui	Underground	Island platform	
●	●	Hongmei Road	虹梅路	19 December 2015	Xuhui	Underground	Island platform	
●		Donglan Road	东兰路	19 December 2015	Minhang	Underground	Island platform	
●		Gudai Road	顾戴路	19 December 2015	Minhang	Underground	Island platform	
●		Hongxin Road	虹莘路	19 December 2015	Minhang	Underground	Island platform	
●		Qixin Road	七莘路	19 December 2015	Minhang	Underground	Island platform	

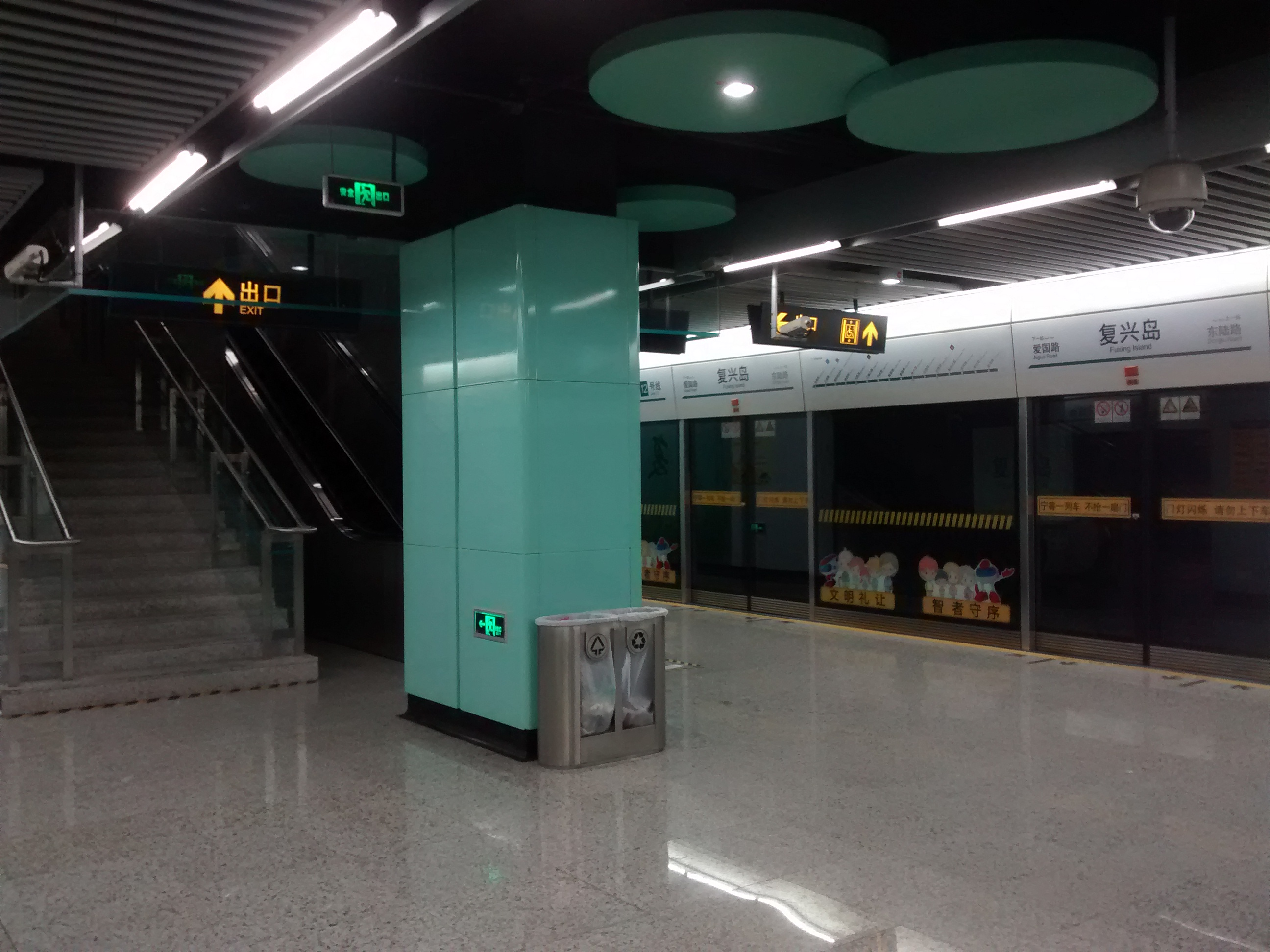
Line 12 platform of Fuxing Island

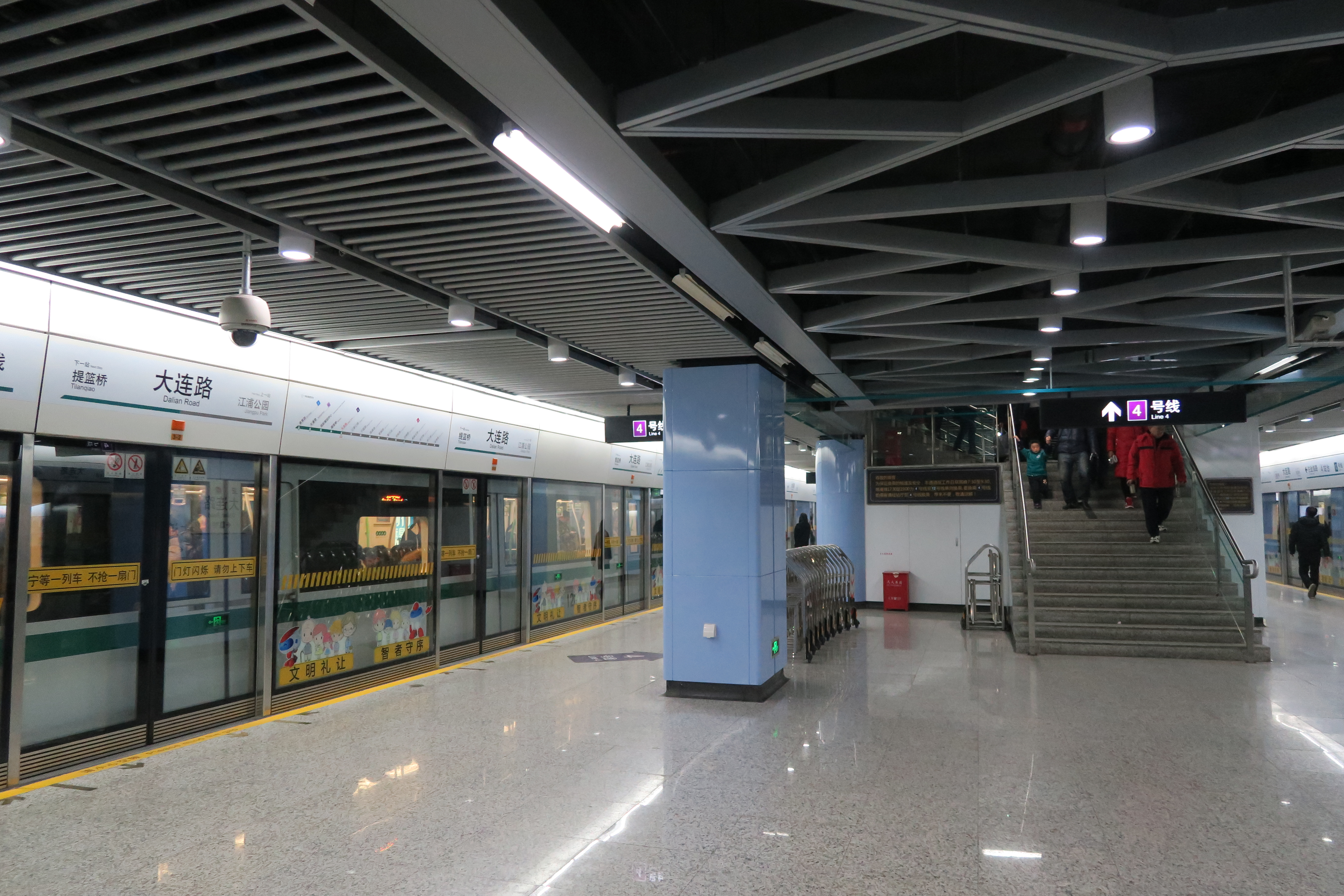
Line 12 platform of Dalian Road

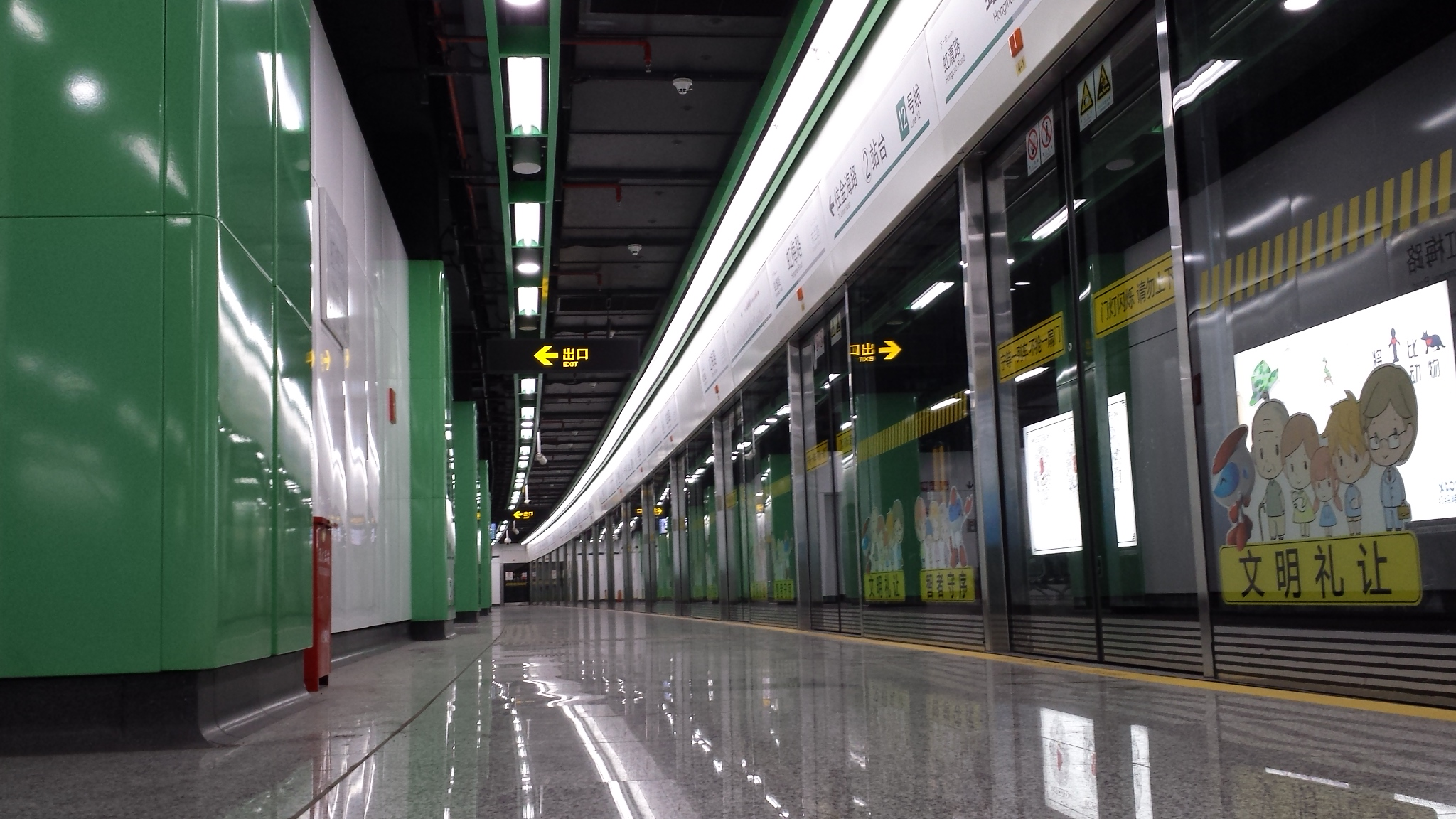
Line 12 platform of Hongmei Road

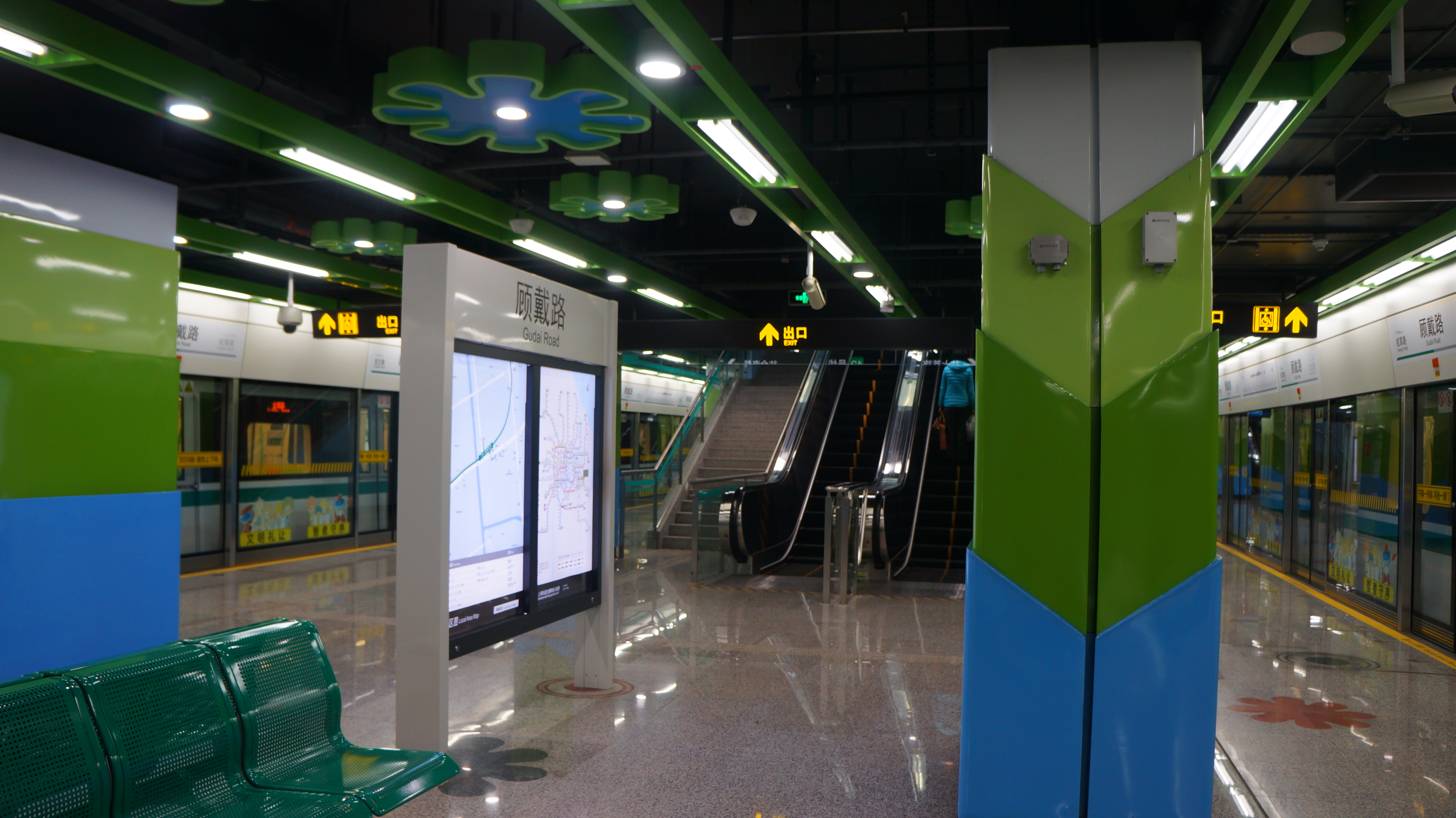
Line 12 platform of Gudai Road

== Line 13 ==
Service Routes		Station Name		Opened	Location	Platform Level	Type of Platform	Transfers
Service Routes		English	Chinese (S)	Opened	Location	Platform Level	Type of Platform	Transfers
●	●	Jinyun Road	金运路	30 December 2012	Jiading	Underground	Island platform	
●	●	West Jinshajiang Road	金沙江西路	30 December 2012	Jiading	Underground	Island platform	
●	●	Fengzhuang	丰庄	30 December 2012	Jiading	Underground	Island platform	
●	●	South Qilianshan Road	祁连山南路	15 June 2013	Putuo	Underground	Island platform	
●	●	Zhenbei Road	真北路	30 December 2012	Putuo	Underground	Island platform	
●	●	Daduhe Road	大渡河路	1 November 2014	Putuo	Underground	Side platform	15
●	●	Jinshajiang Road	金沙江路	30 December 2012	Putuo	Underground	Island platform	3 4
●	●	Longde Road	隆德路	28 December 2014	Putuo	Underground	Island platform	11
●	●	Wuning Road	武宁路	28 December 2014	Putuo	Underground	Island platform	14
●	●	Changshou Road	长寿路	28 December 2014	Putuo	Underground	Island platform	7
●	●	Jiangning Road	江宁路	19 December 2015	Putuo	Underground	Island platform	
●	●	Hanzhong Road	汉中路	19 December 2015	Jing'an	Underground	Island platform	1 12
●	●	Shanghai Natural History Museum	自然博物馆	19 December 2015	Jing'an	Underground	Island platform	
●	●	West Nanjing Road	南京西路	19 December 2015	Jing'an	Underground	Side platform	2 12
●	●	Middle Huaihai Road	淮海中路	19 December 2015	Huangpu	Underground	Island platform	
●	●	Site of the First CPC National Congress · Xintiandi	一大会址·新天地	19 December 2015	Huangpu	Underground	Island platform	10
●	●	Madang Road	马当路	20 April 2010－2 November 2010 (as the Expo 2010 Line); 19 December 2015 (as Line 13)	Huangpu	Underground	Island platform	9
●	●	World Expo Museum	世博会博物馆	20 April 2010－2 November 2010 (as the Expo 2010 Line); 19 December 2015 (as Line 13)	Huangpu	Underground	Island platform	
●	●	Shibo Avenue	世博大道	20 April 2010－2 November 2010 (as the Expo 2010 Line); 19 December 2015 (as Line 13)	Pudong	Underground	One side platform and one island platform	
●	●	Changqing Road	长清路	30 December 2018	Pudong	Underground	Island platform	7
●	●	Chengshan Road	成山路	30 December 2018	Pudong	Underground	Island platform	8
●	●	Dongming Road	东明路	30 December 2018	Pudong	Underground	Island platform	6
●	●	Huapeng Road	华鹏路	30 December 2018	Pudong	Underground	Island platform	
●		Xianan Road	下南路	30 December 2018	Pudong	Underground	Island platform	
●		Beicai	北蔡	30 December 2018	Pudong	Underground	Island platform	
●		Chenchun Road	陈春路	30 December 2018	Pudong	Underground	Island platform	
●		Lianxi Road	莲溪路	30 December 2018	Pudong	Underground	Island platform	18
●		Middle Huaxia Road	华夏中路	30 December 2018	Pudong	Underground	Double island platform	16
●		Zhongke Road	中科路	30 December 2018	Pudong	Underground	Island platform	
●		Xuelin Road	学林路	30 December 2018	Pudong	Underground	Island platform	
●		Zhangjiang Road	张江路	30 December 2018	Pudong	Underground	Island platform	

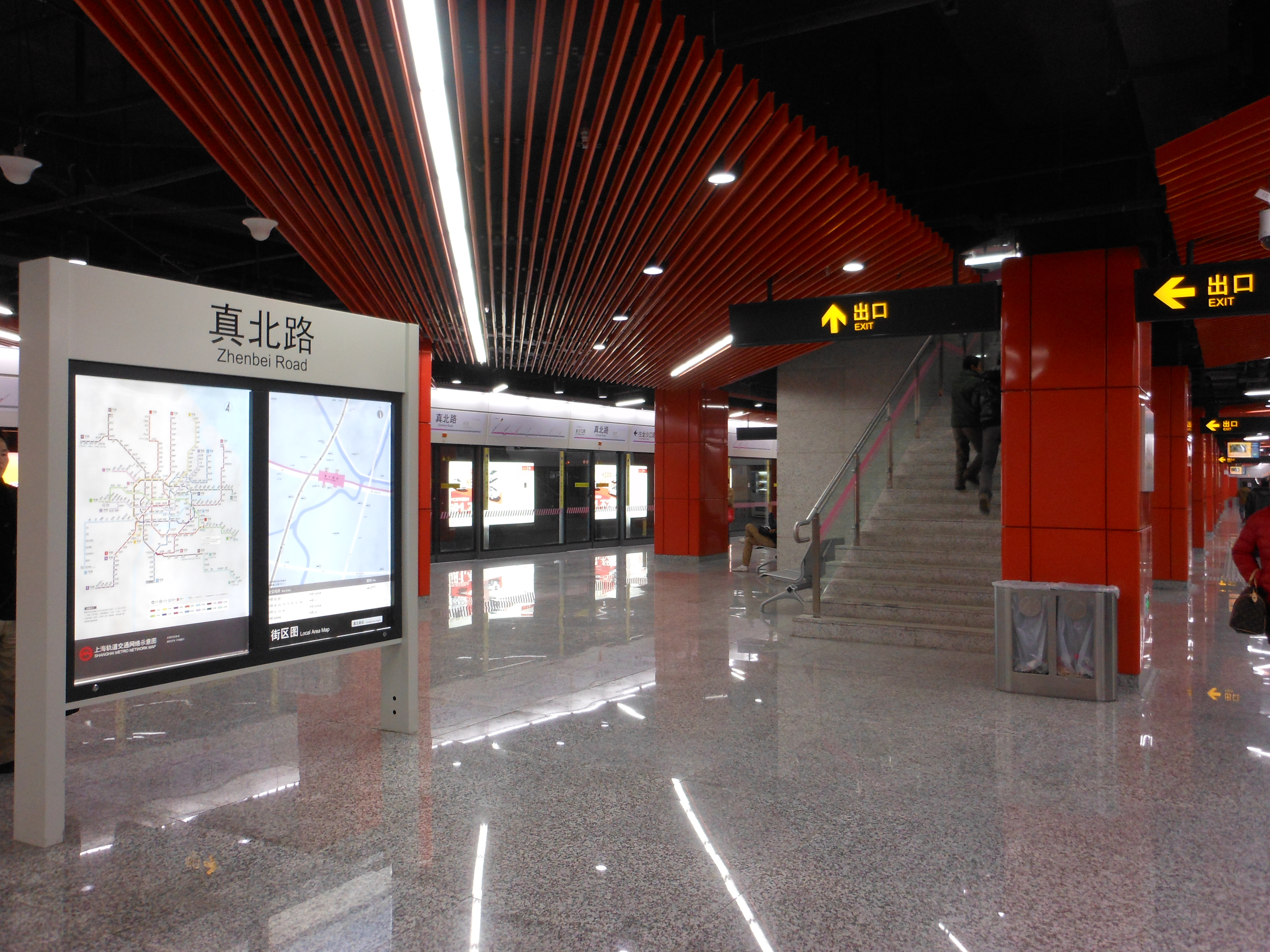
Line 13 platform of Zhenbei Road

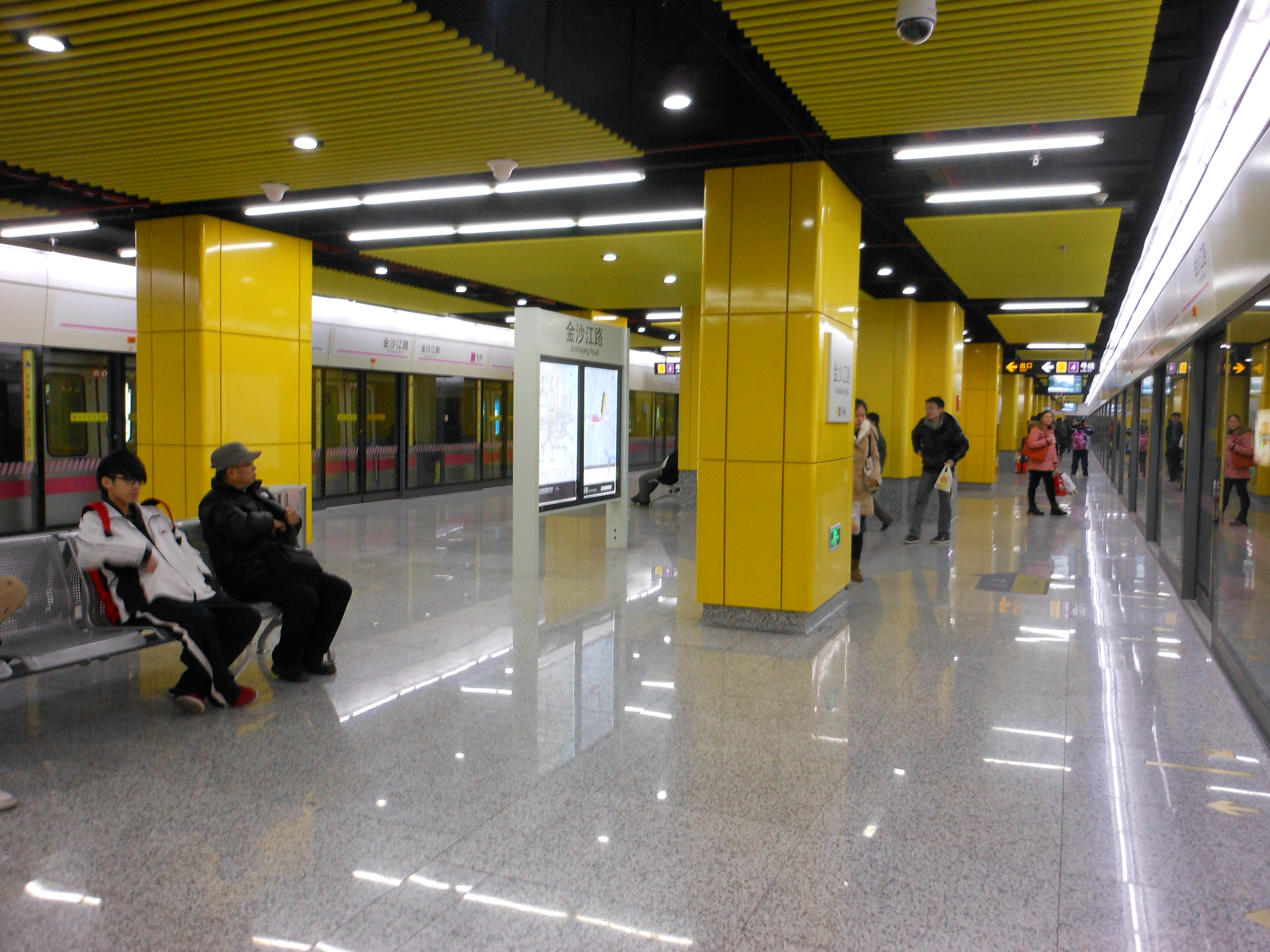
Line 13 platform of Jinshajiang Road

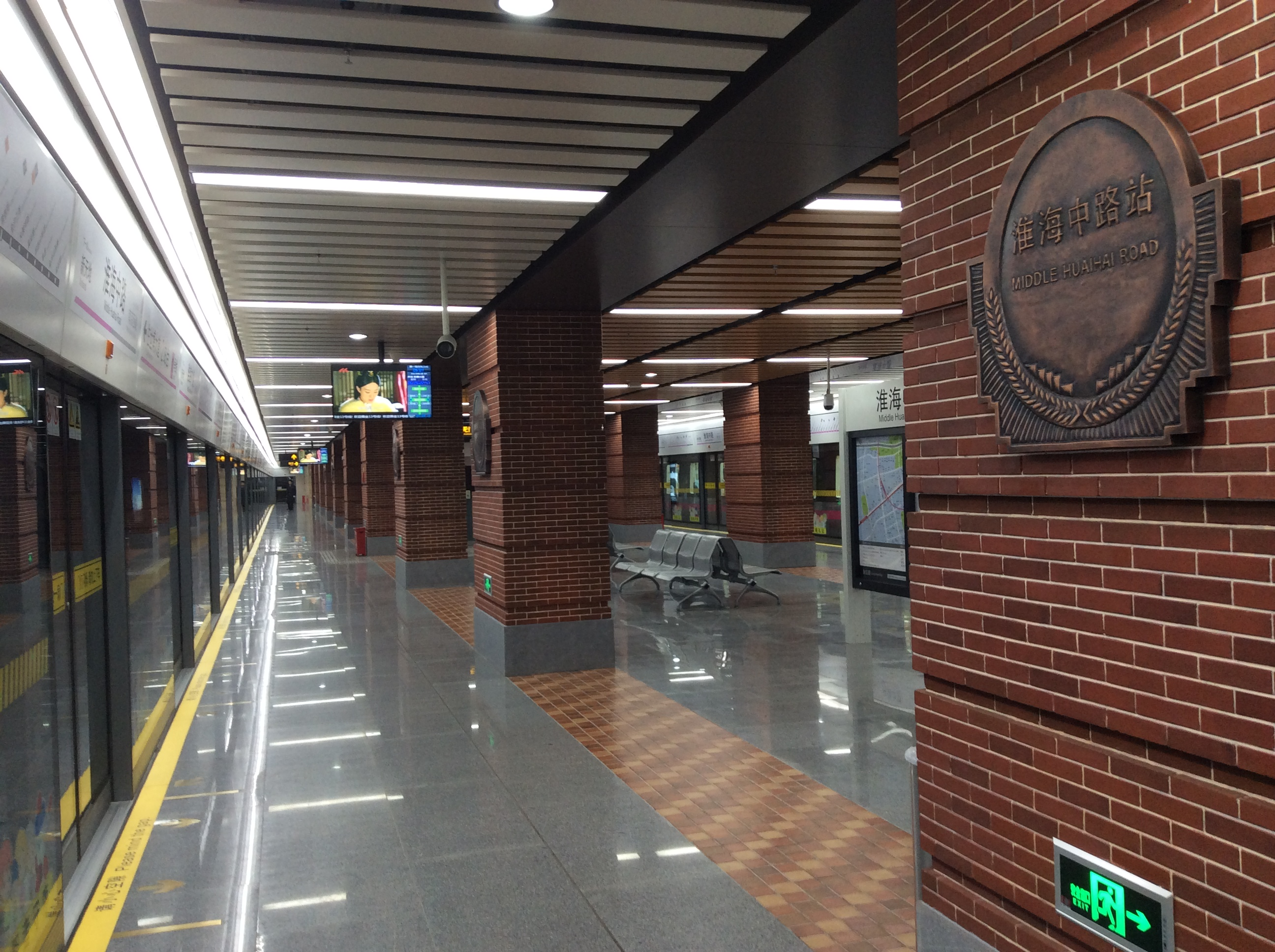
Line 13 platform of Middle Huaihai Road

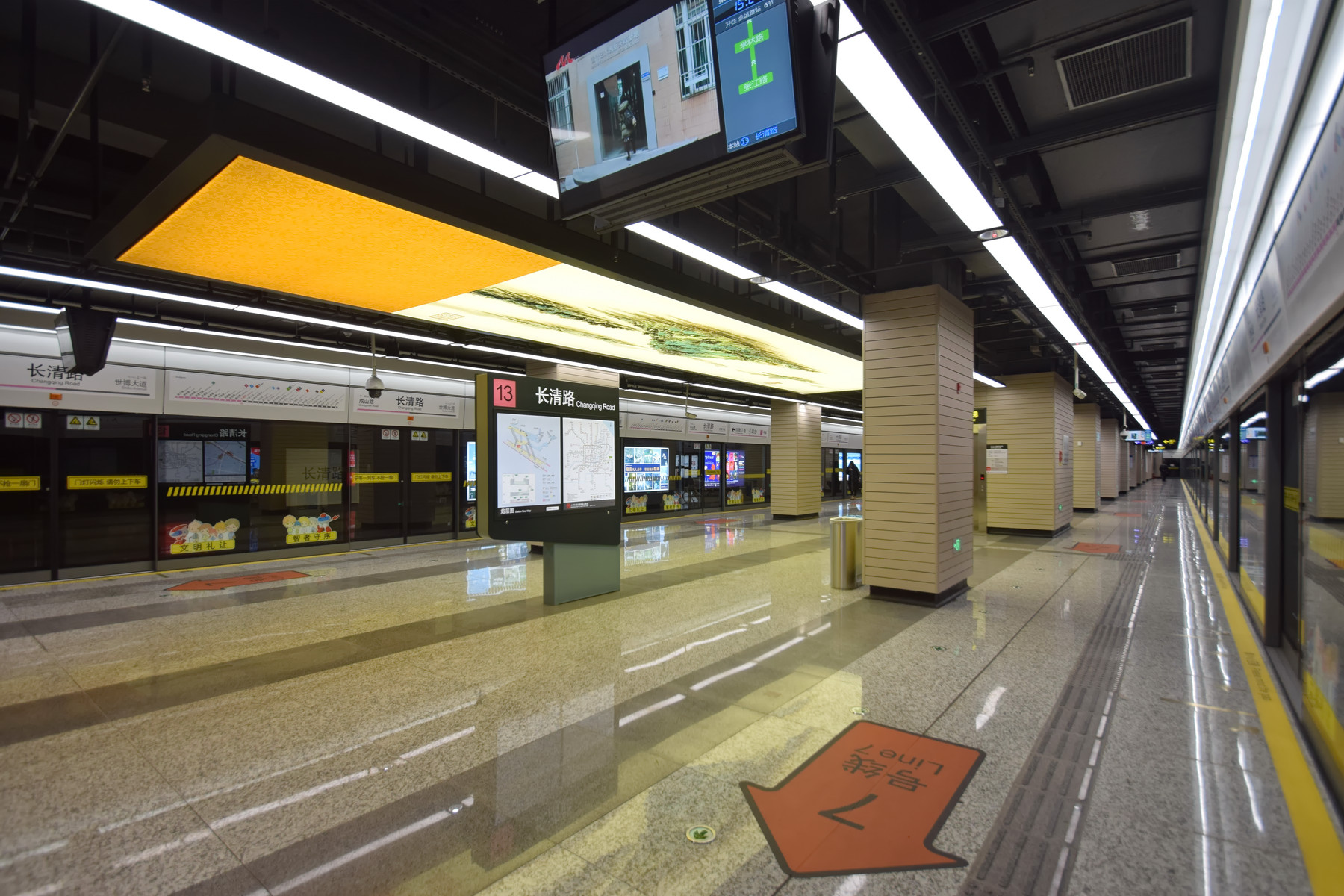
Line 13 platform of Changqing Road

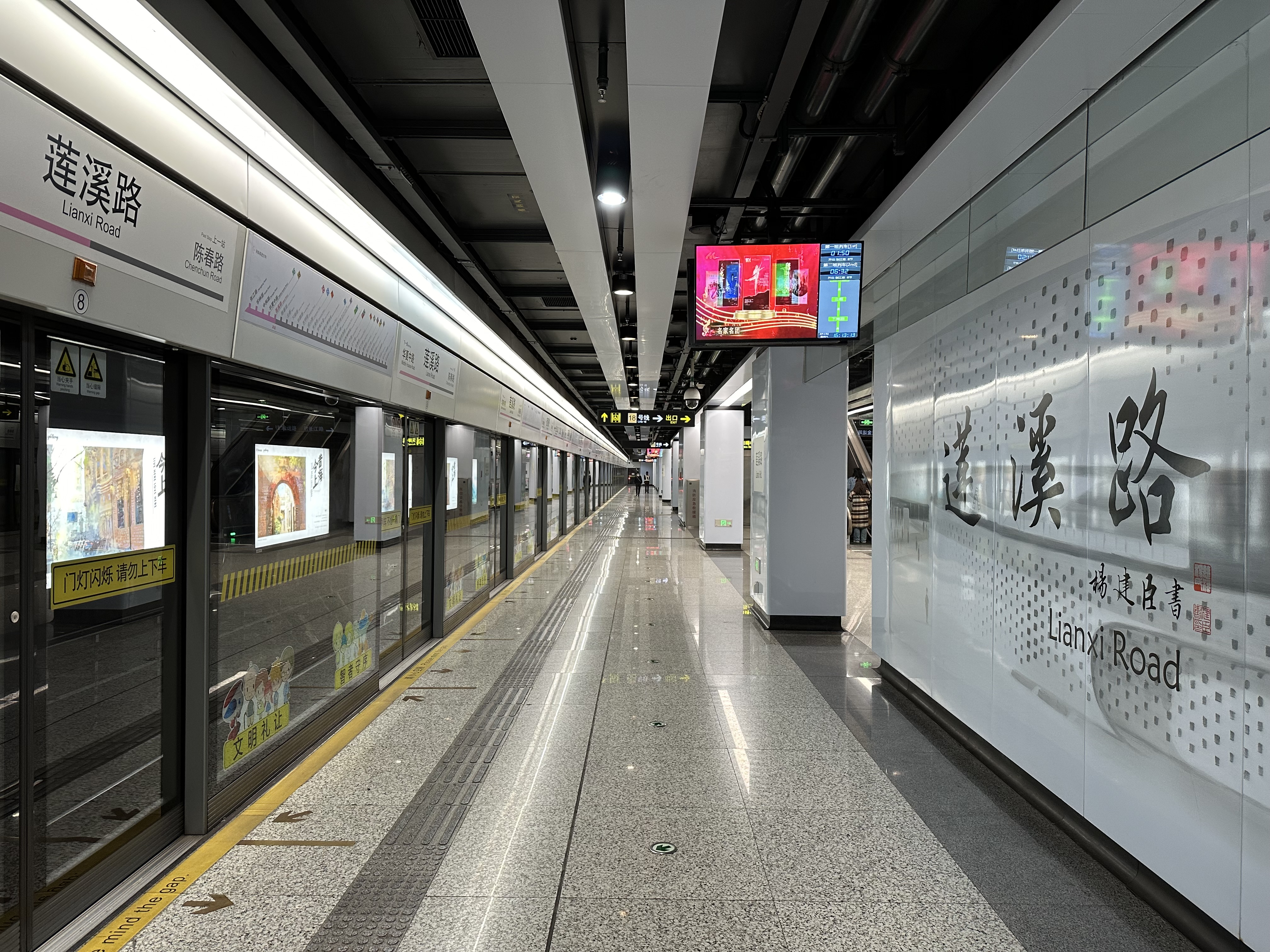
Line 13 platform of Lianxi Road

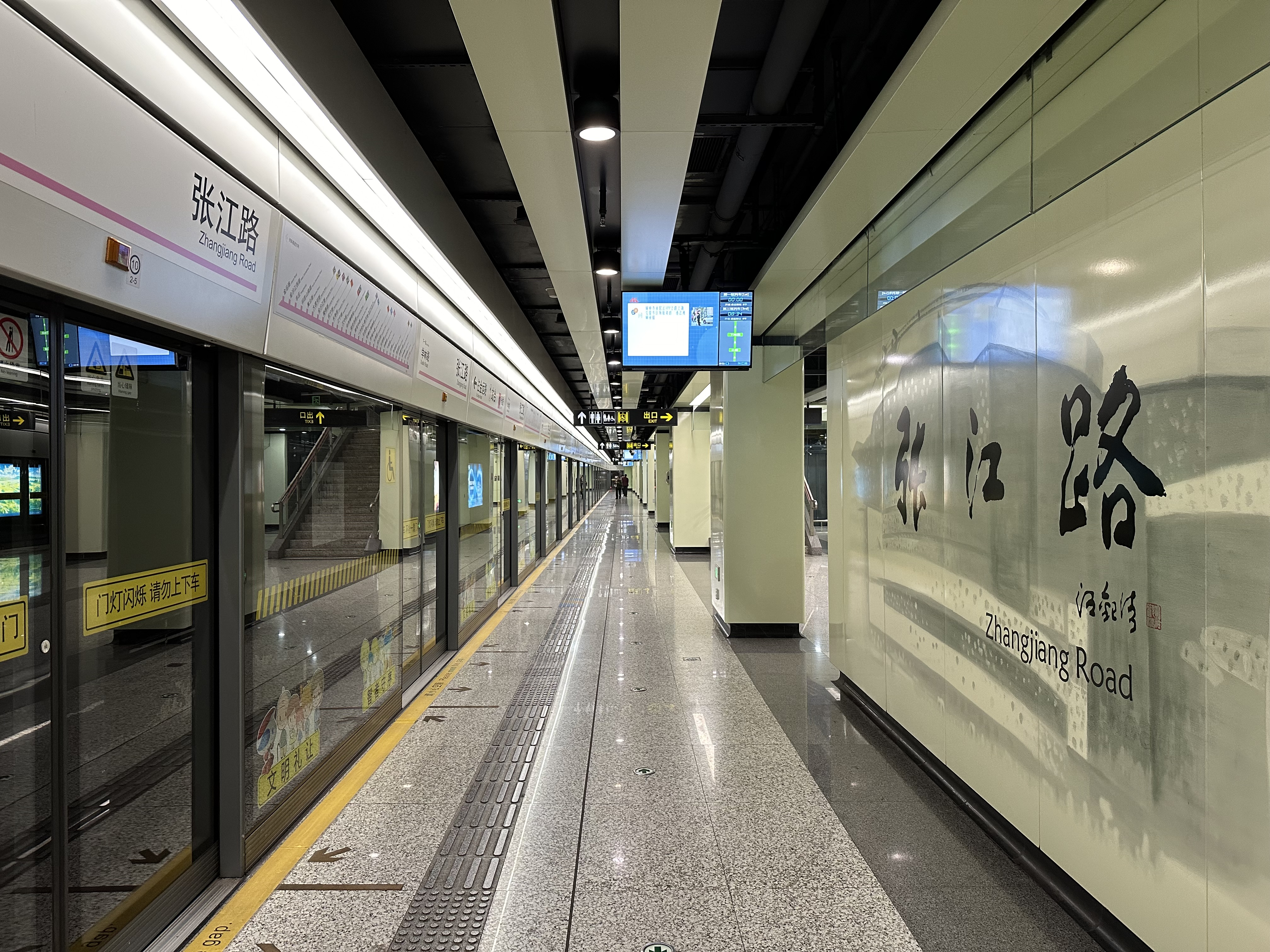
Line 13 platform of Zhangjiang Road

== Line 14 ==
Service Routes		Station Name		Opened	Location	Platform Level	Type of Platform	Transfers
Service Routes		English	Chinese (S)	Opened	Location	Platform Level	Type of Platform	Transfers
●		Fengbang	封浜	30 December 2021	Jiading	Underground	Island platform	
●		Lexiu Road	乐秀路	30 December 2021	Jiading	Underground	Island platform	
●		Lintao Road	临洮路	30 December 2021	Jiading	Underground	Island platform	
●		Jiayi Road	嘉怡路	30 December 2021	Jiading	Underground	Island platform	
●		Dingbian Road	定边路	30 December 2021	Jiading	Underground	Island platform	
●	●	Zhenxin Xincun	真新新村	30 December 2021	Jiading	Underground	Island platform	
●	●	Zhenguang Road	真光路	30 December 2021	Putuo	Underground	Island platform	
●	●	Tongchuan Road	铜川路	30 December 2021	Putuo	Underground	Island platform	15
●	●	Zhenru	真如	30 December 2021	Putuo	Underground	Island platform	11
●	●	Zhongning Road	中宁路	30 December 2021	Putuo	Underground	Island platform	
●	●	Caoyang Road	曹杨路	30 December 2021	Putuo	Underground	One side platform and one island platform	3 4 11
●	●	Wuning Road	武宁路	30 December 2021	Putuo	Underground	Island platform	13
●	●	Wuding Road	武定路	30 December 2021	Jing'an	Underground	Island platform	
●	●	Jing'an Temple	静安寺	30 December 2021	Jing'an	Underground	Split platform	2 7
●	●	Site of the First CPC National Congress · South Huangpi Road	一大会址·黄陂南路	30 December 2021	Huangpu	Underground	Side platform	1
●	●	Dashijie	大世界	30 December 2021	Huangpu	Underground	Island platform	8
●	●	Yuyuan Garden	豫园	30 December 2021	Huangpu	Underground	Island platform	10
●	●	Lujiazui	陆家嘴	30 December 2021	Pudong	Underground	Island platform	2
●	●	South Pudong Road	浦东南路	30 December 2021	Pudong	Underground	Island platform	2
●	●	Pudong Avenue	浦东大道	30 December 2021	Pudong	Underground	Island platform	4
●	●	Yuanshen Road	源深路	30 December 2021	Pudong	Underground	Side platform	
●	●	Changyi Road	昌邑路	30 December 2021	Pudong	Underground	Island platform	18
●	●	Xiepu Road	歇浦路	30 December 2021	Pudong	Underground	Island platform	
●	●	Yunshan Road	云山路	30 December 2021	Pudong	Underground	Island platform	6
●	●	Lantian Road	蓝天路	30 December 2021	Pudong	Underground	Island platform	9
●		Huangyang Road	黄杨路	30 December 2021	Pudong	Underground	Island platform	
●		Yunshun Road	云顺路	30 December 2021	Pudong	Underground	Island platform	
●		Pudong Football Stadium	浦东足球场	30 December 2021	Pudong	Underground	Island platform	
●		Jinyue Road	金粤路	30 December 2021	Pudong	Underground	Island platform	
●		Guiqiao Road	桂桥路	30 December 2021	Pudong	Underground	Island platform	

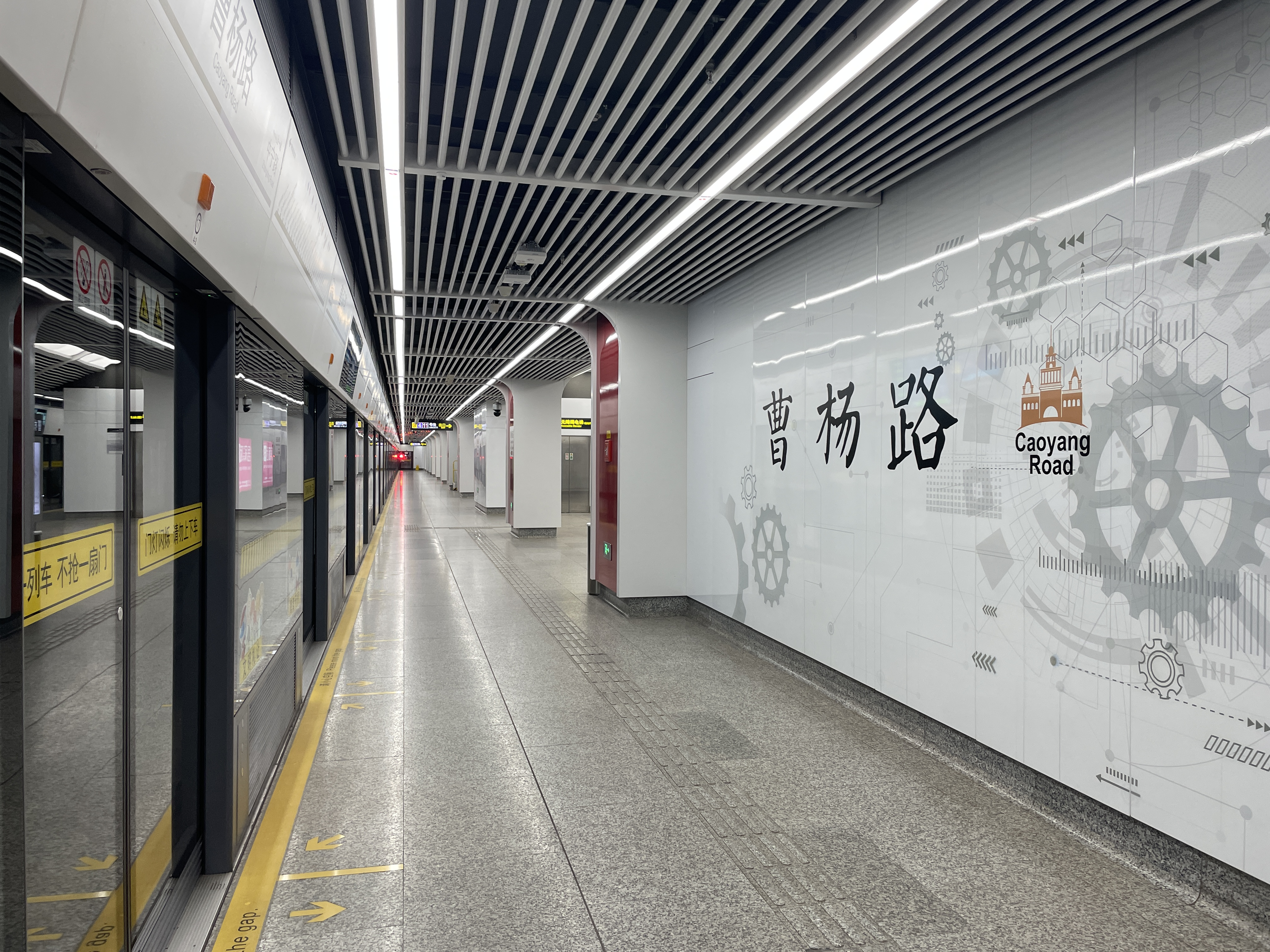
Line 14 platform of Caoyang Road

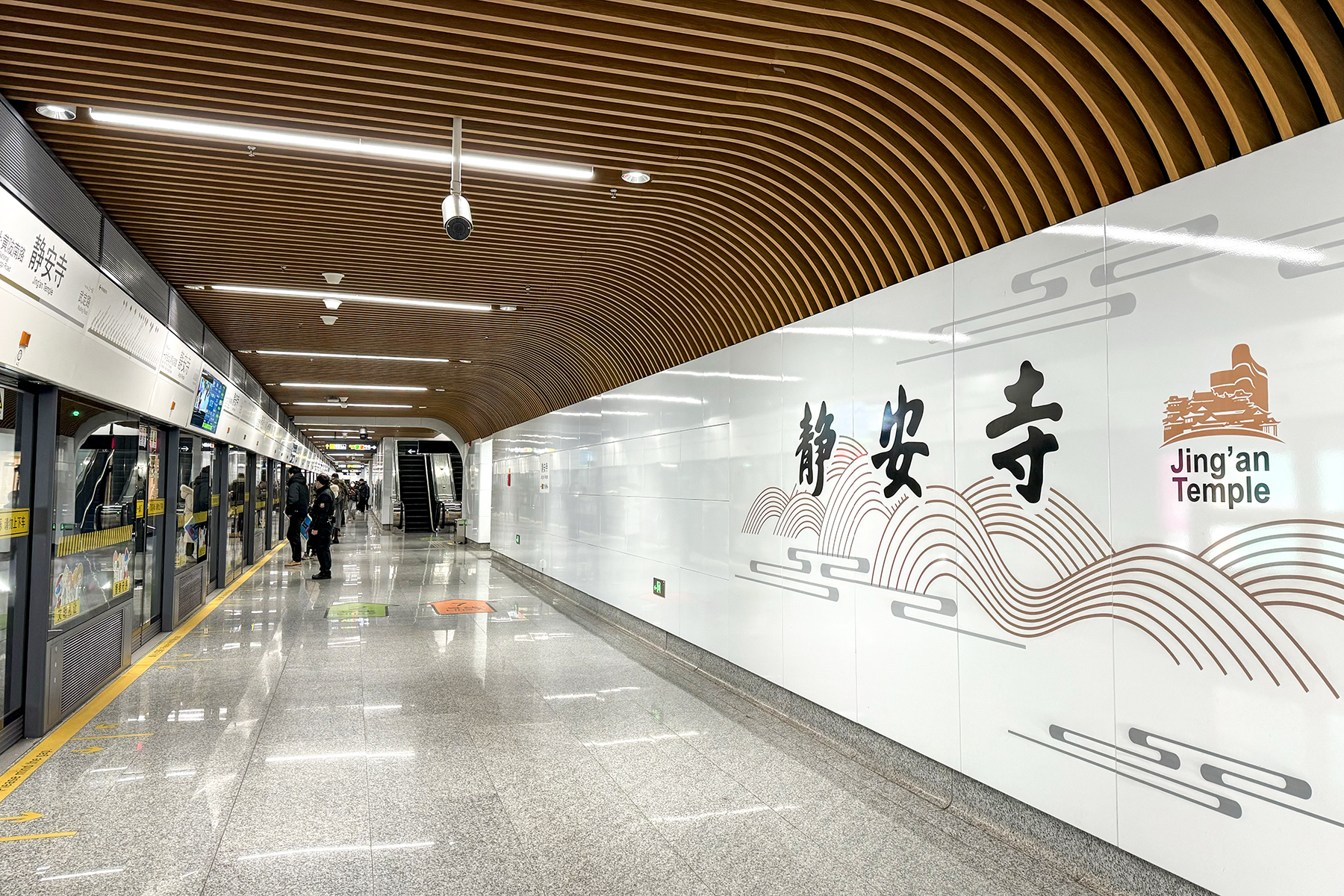
Line 14 platform of Jing'an Temple

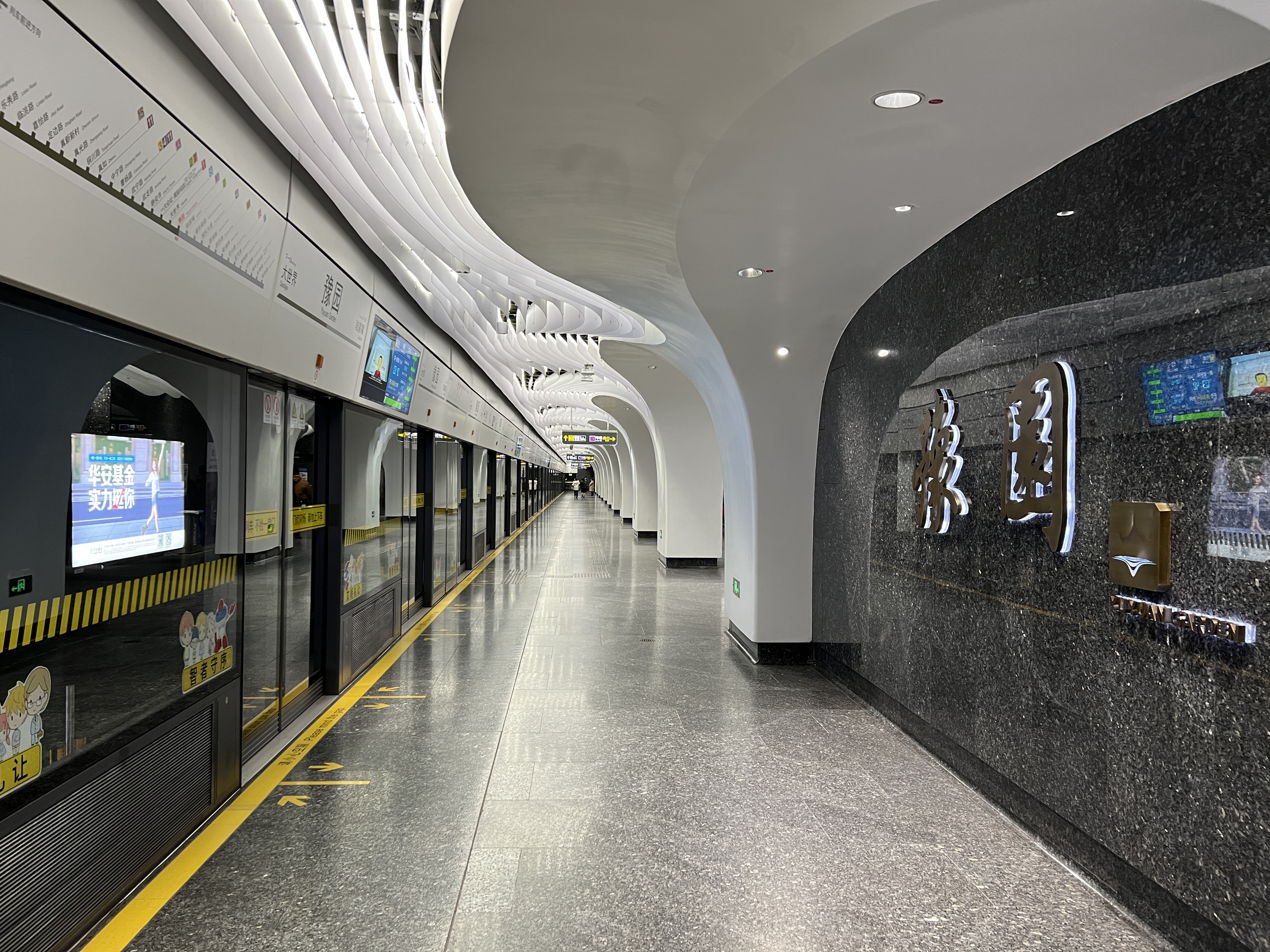
Line 14 platform of Yuyuan Garden

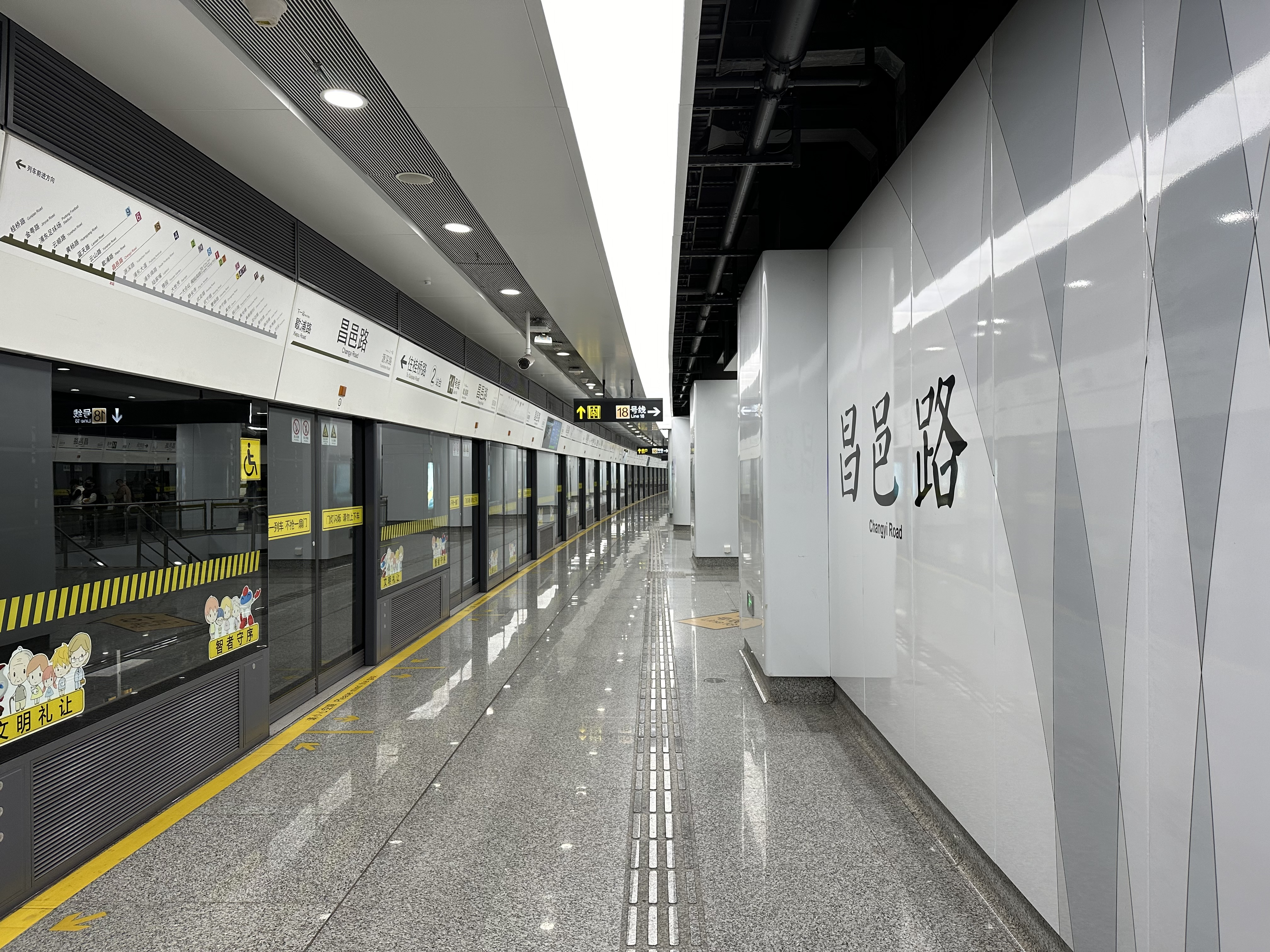
Line 14 platform of Changyi Road

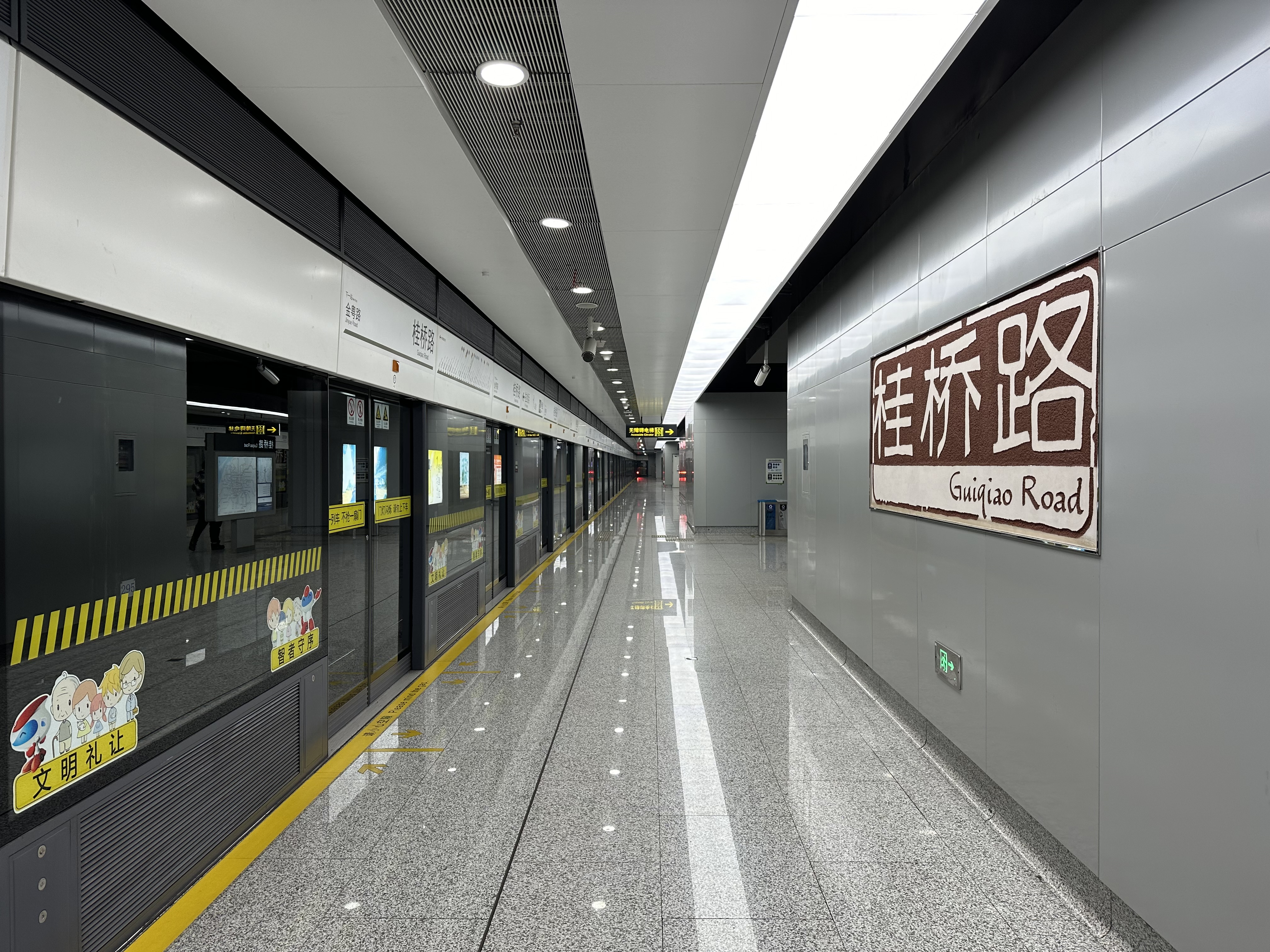
Line 14 platform of Guiqiao Road

== Line 15 ==
Service Routes		Station Name		Opened	Location	Platform Level	Type of Platform	Transfers
Service Routes		English	Chinese (S)	Opened	Location	Platform Level	Type of Platform	Transfers
●		Gucun Park	顾村公园	23 January 2021	Baoshan	Underground	Island platform	7
●		Jinqiu Road	锦秋路	23 January 2021	Baoshan	Underground	Island platform	
●		Fengxiang Road	丰翔路	23 January 2021	Baoshan	Underground	Island platform	
●		Nanda Road	南大路	23 January 2021	Baoshan	Underground	Island platform	
●		Qi'an Road	祁安路	23 January 2021	Putuo	Underground	Island platform	
●	●	Gulang Road	古浪路	23 January 2021	Putuo	Underground	One side platform and one island platform	
●	●	East Wuwei Road	武威东路	23 January 2021	Putuo	Underground	Island platform	
●	●	Shanghai West Railway Station	上海西站	23 January 2021	Putuo	Underground	Island platform	11 Shanghaixi
●	●	Tongchuan Road	铜川路	23 January 2021	Putuo	Underground	Island platform	14
●	●	North Meiling Road	梅岭北路	23 January 2021	Putuo	Underground	Island platform	
●	●	Daduhe Road	大渡河路	23 January 2021	Putuo	Underground	Island platform	13
●	●	Changfeng Park	长风公园	23 January 2021	Putuo	Underground	Island platform	
●	●	Loushanguan Road	娄山关路	23 January 2021	Changning	Underground	Island platform	2
●	●	Hongbaoshi Road	红宝石路	23 January 2021	Changning	Underground	Island platform	
●	●	Yaohong Road	姚虹路	23 January 2021	Changning	Underground	Island platform	
●	●	Wuzhong Road	吴中路	23 January 2021	Minhang	Underground	Island platform	
●	●	Guilin Road	桂林路	27 June 2021	Xuhui	Underground	Island platform	9
●	●	Guilin Park	桂林公园	23 January 2021	Xuhui	Underground	Island platform	12
●	●	Shanghai South Railway Station	上海南站	23 January 2021	Xuhui	Underground	Island platform	1 3 Jinshan; Shanghainan
●	●	East China University of Science and Technology	华东理工大学	23 January 2021	Xuhui	Underground	Island platform	
●	●	Luoxiu Road	罗秀路	23 January 2021	Xuhui	Underground	Island platform	
●	●	Zhumei Road	朱梅路	23 January 2021	Xuhui	Underground	Island platform	
●	●	Jinghong Road	景洪路	23 January 2021	Xuhui	Underground	Island platform	Airport Link
●	●	South Hongmei Road	虹梅南路	23 January 2021	Minhang	Underground	Island platform	
●	●	Jingxi Road	景西路	23 January 2021	Minhang	Underground	Island platform	
●	●	Shujian Road	曙建路	23 January 2021	Minhang	Underground	Island platform	
●	●	Shuangbai Road	双柏路	23 January 2021	Minhang	Underground	Island platform	
●		Yuanjiang Road	元江路	23 January 2021	Minhang	Underground	Island platform	
●		Yongde Road	永德路	23 January 2021	Minhang	Underground	Island platform	
●		Zizhu Hi-tech Park	紫竹高新区	23 January 2021	Minhang	Underground	Island platform	

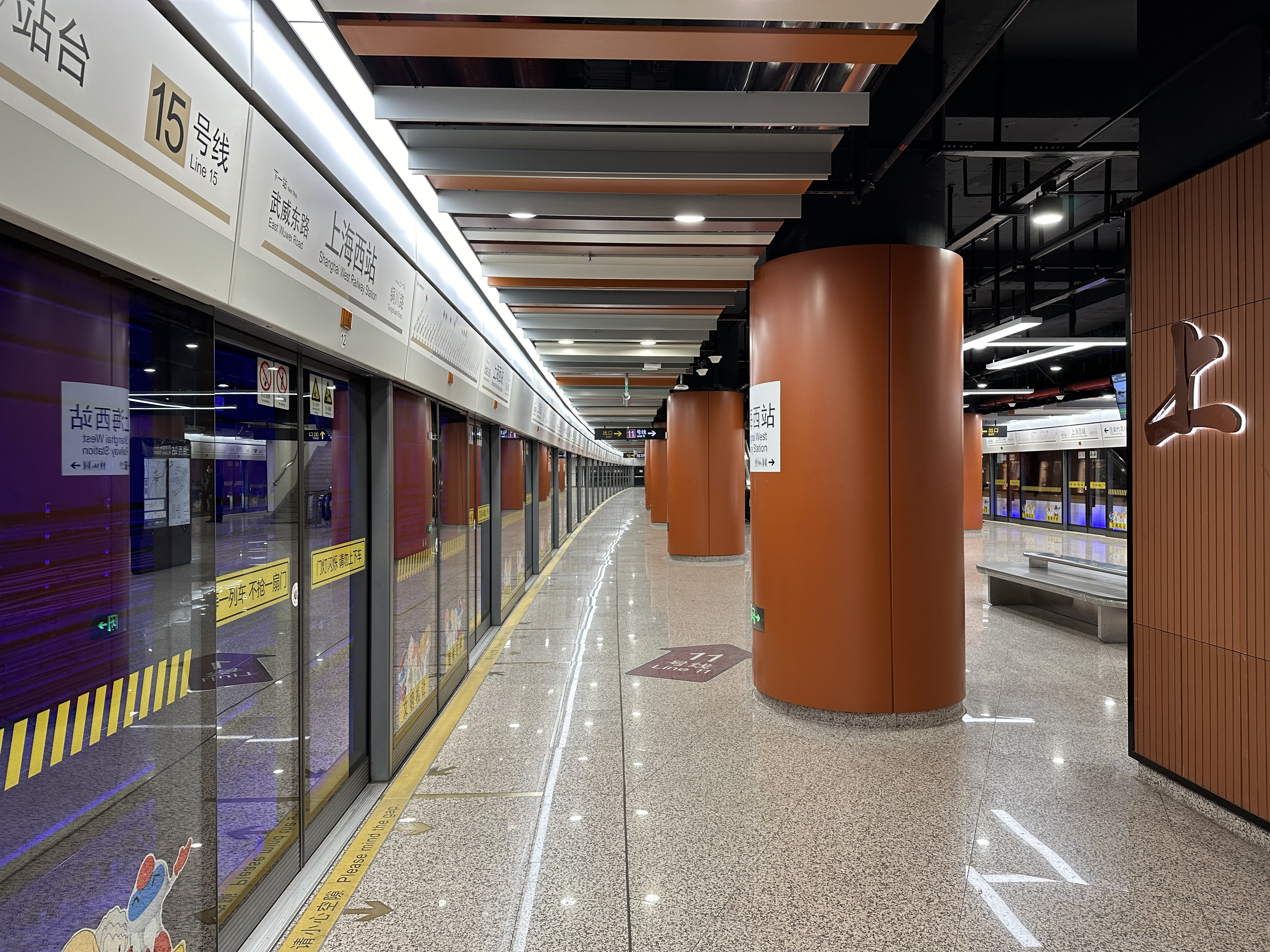
Line 15 platform of Shanghai West Railway Station

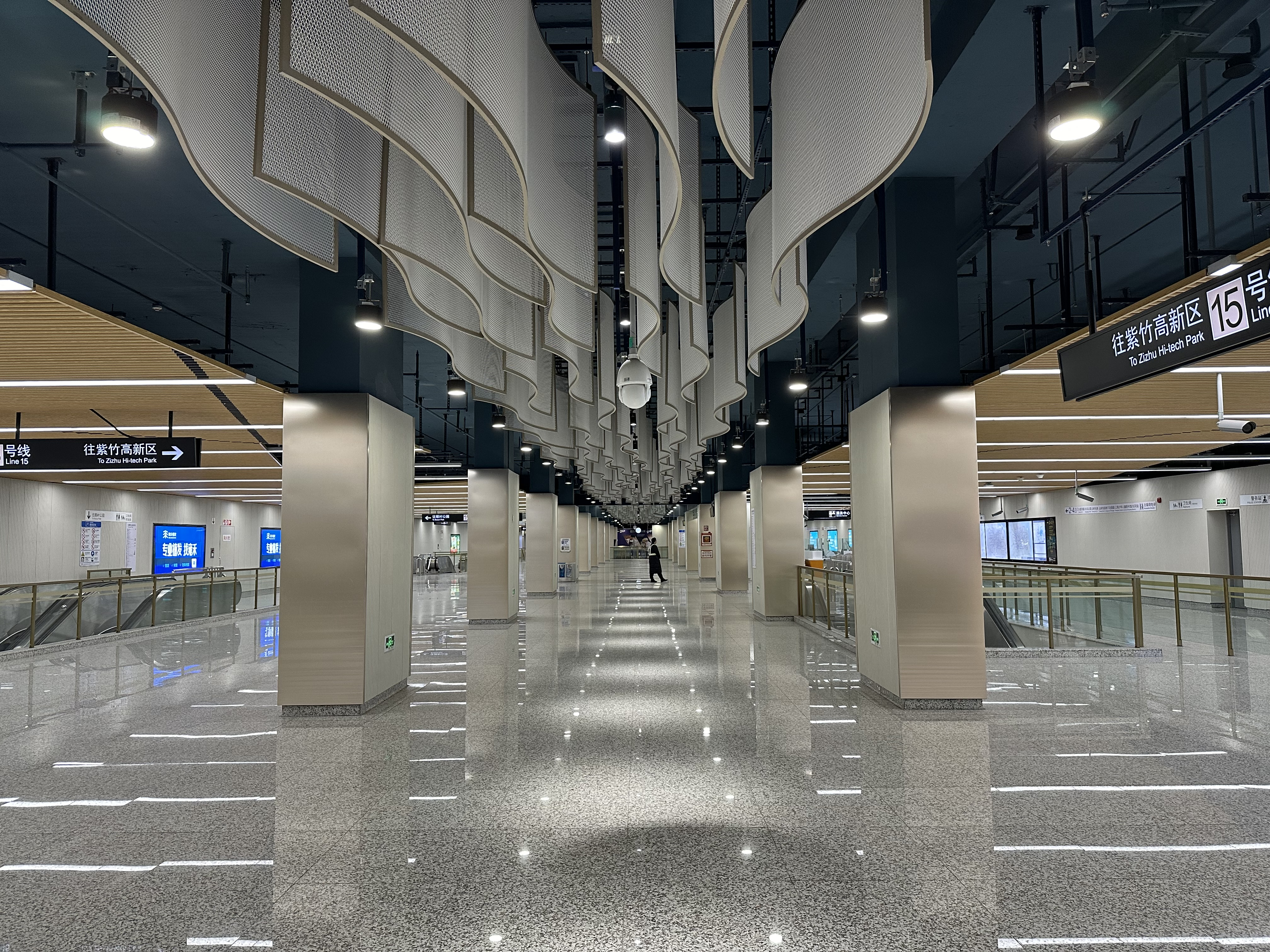
Concourse of Changfeng Park

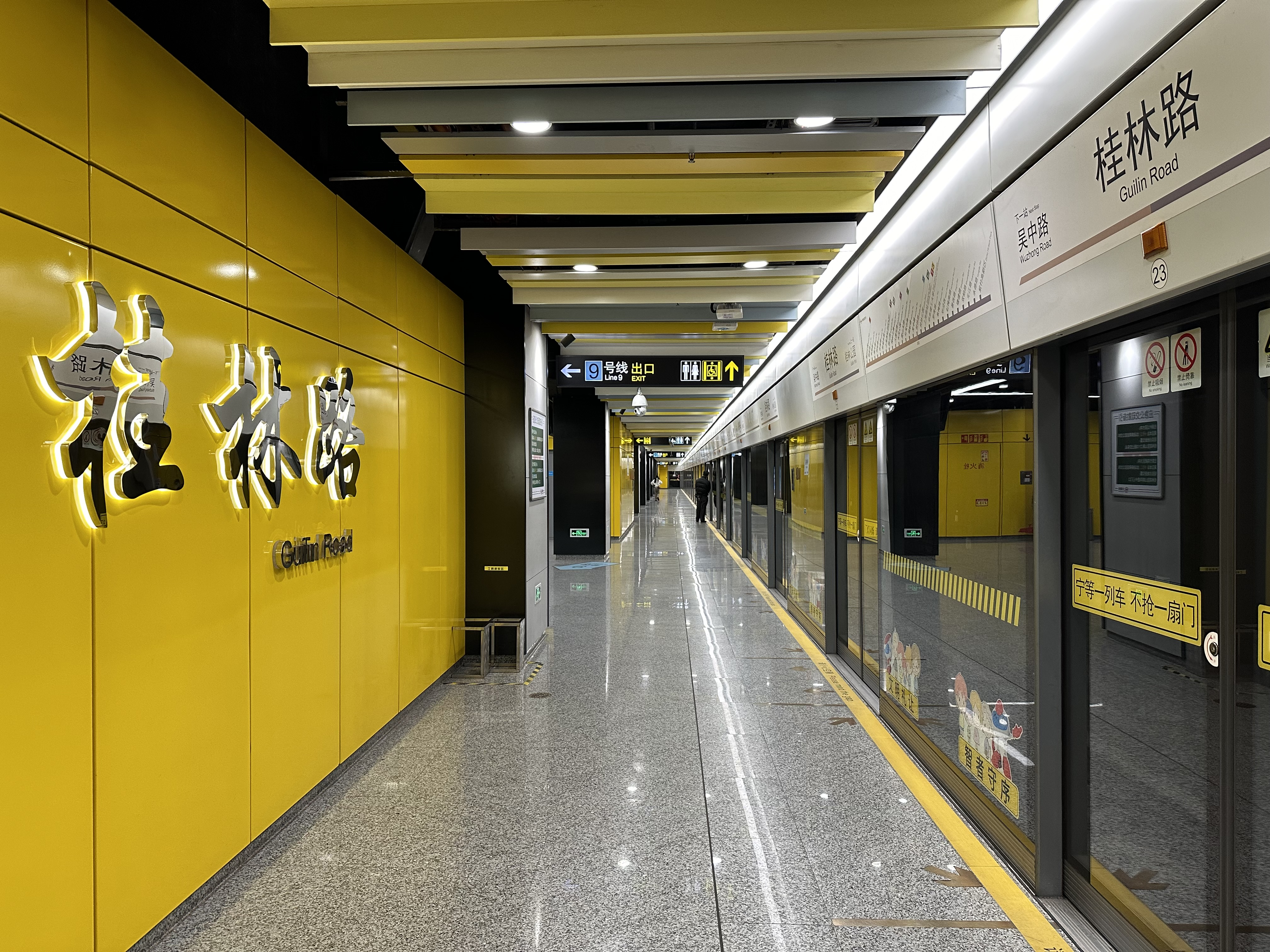
Line 15 platform of Guilin Road

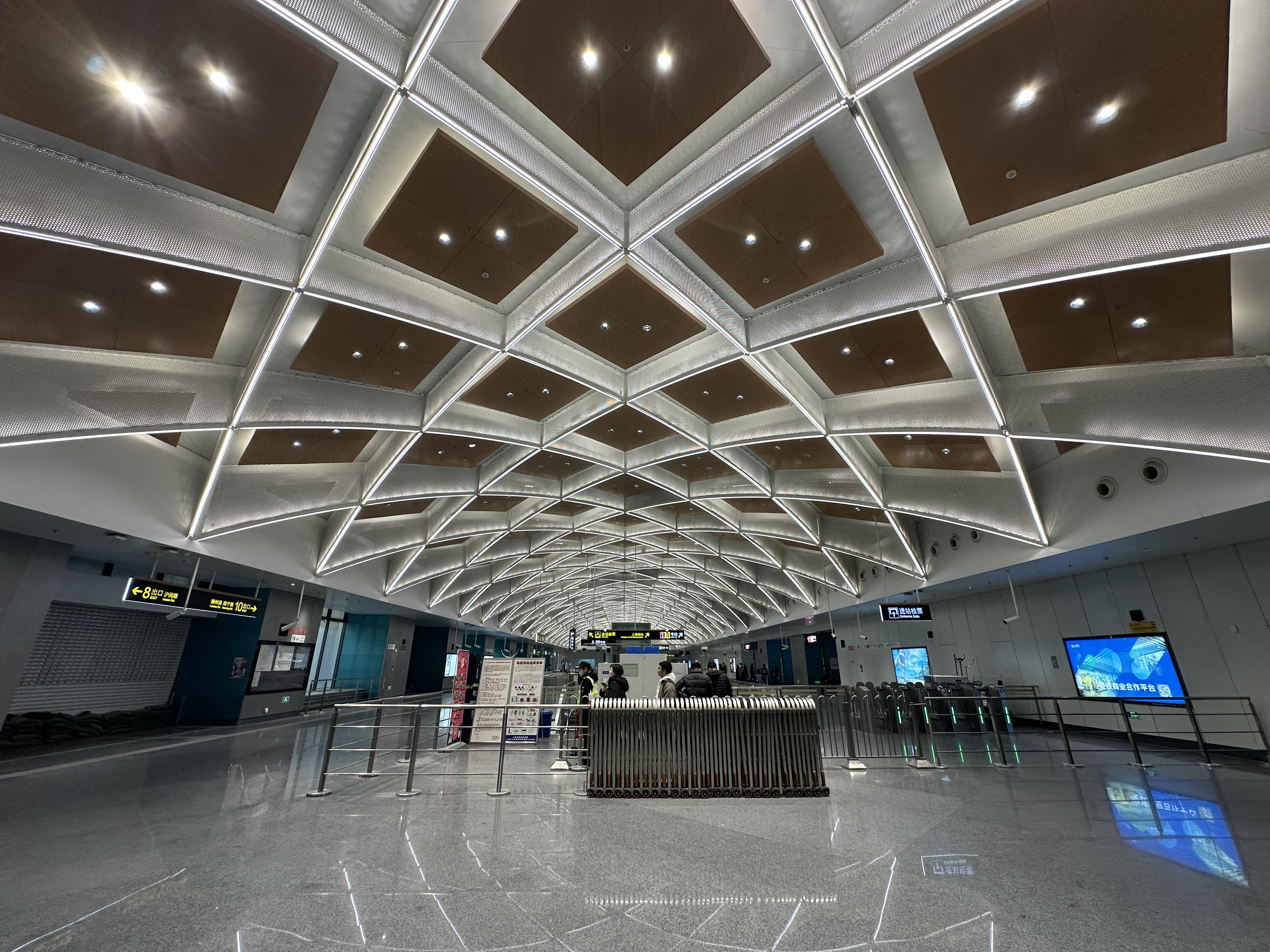
Line 15 concourse of Shanghai South Railway Station

== Line 16 ==
Service Routes			Station Name		Opened	Location	Platform Level	Type of Platform	Transfers
Express	Rapid	Local	English	Chinese (S)	Opened	Location	Platform Level	Type of Platform	Transfers
●	●	●	Longyang Road	龙阳路	28 December 2014	Pudong	Elevated	Double island platform	2 7 18; Maglev
｜	｜	●	Middle Huaxia Road	华夏中路	28 December 2014	Pudong	Elevated	Island platform	13
｜	●	●	Luoshan Road	罗山路	29 December 2013	Pudong	Elevated	Island platform	11
｜	｜	●	East Zhoupu	周浦东	29 December 2013	Pudong	Elevated	Side platform	
｜	｜	●	Heshahangcheng	鹤沙航城	29 December 2013	Pudong	Elevated	Side platform	
｜	｜	●	East Hangtou	航头东	29 December 2013	Pudong	Elevated	Double island platform	
｜	●	●	Xinchang	新场	29 December 2013	Pudong	Elevated	Side platform	
｜	｜	●	Wild Animal Park	野生动物园	29 December 2013	Pudong	Elevated	Double island platform	
｜	●	●	Huinan	惠南	29 December 2013	Pudong	Underground	Side platform	
｜	｜	●	East Huinan	惠南东	29 December 2013	Pudong	Elevated	Double island platform	
｜	｜	●	Shuyuan	书院	29 December 2013	Pudong	Elevated	One side platform and one island platform	
｜	●	●	Lingang Avenue	临港大道	29 December 2013	Pudong	Underground	One side platform and one island platform	
●	●	●	Dishui Lake	滴水湖	29 December 2013	Pudong	Underground	Double island platform	

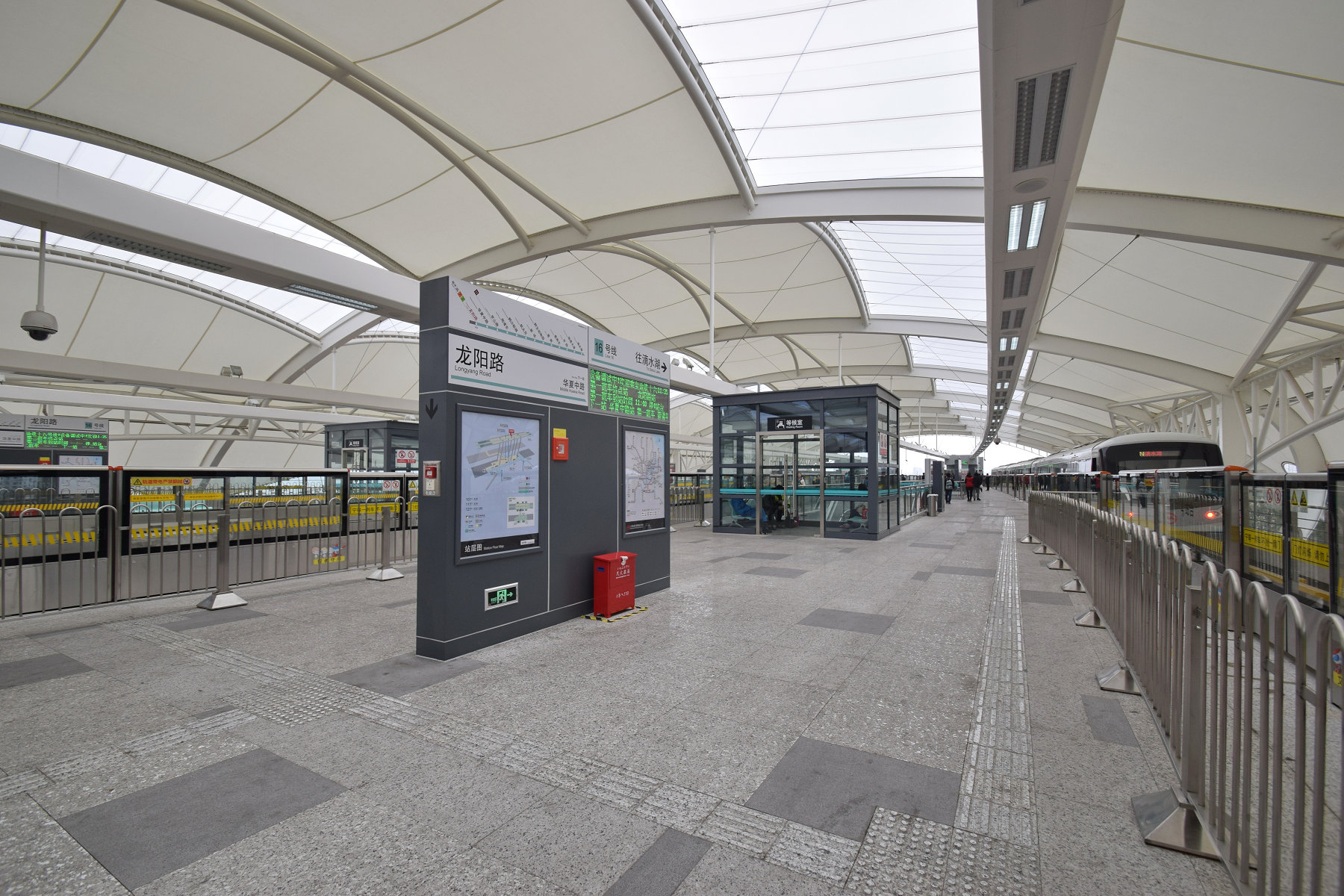
Line 16 platform of Longyang Road

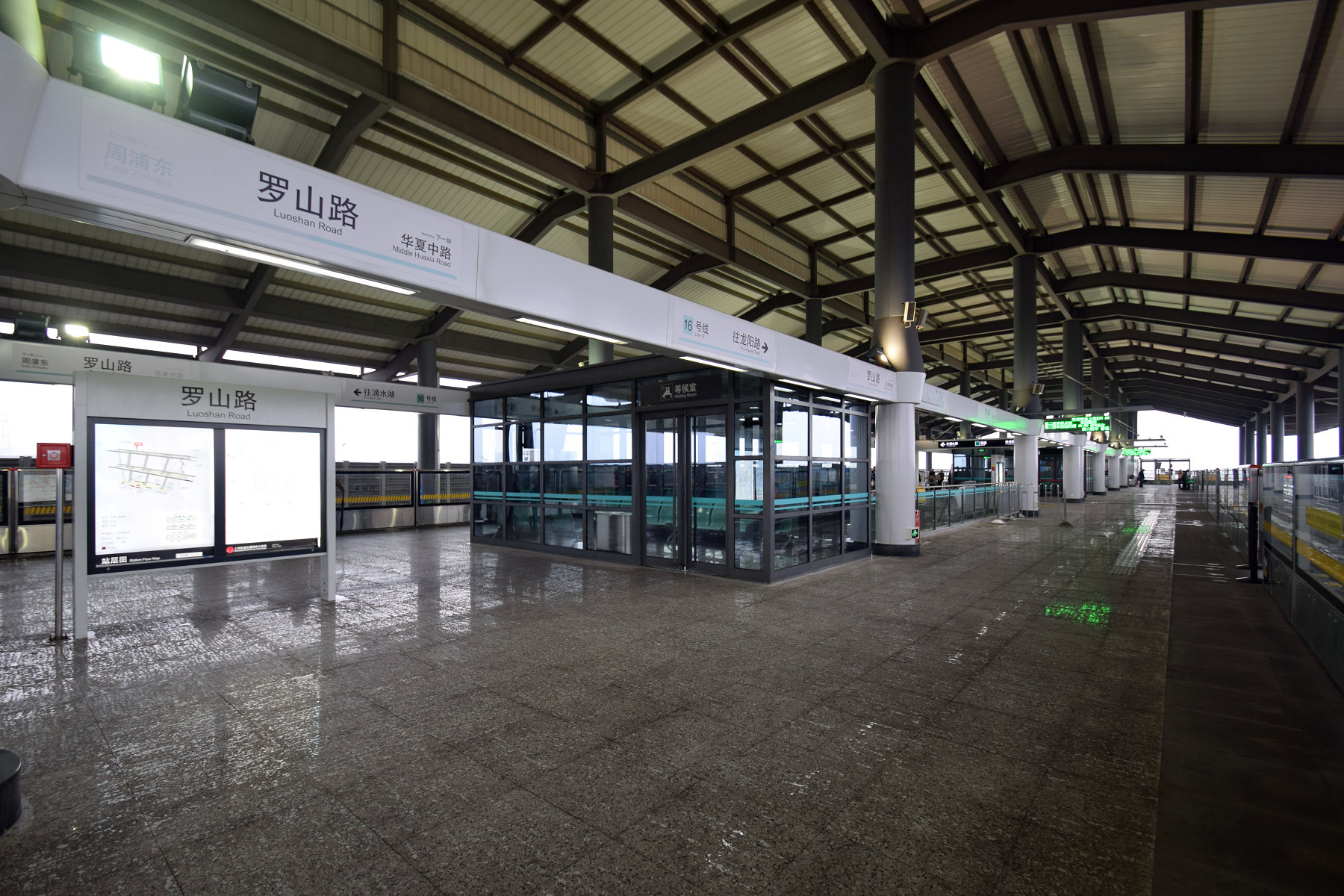
Line 16 platform of Luoshan Road

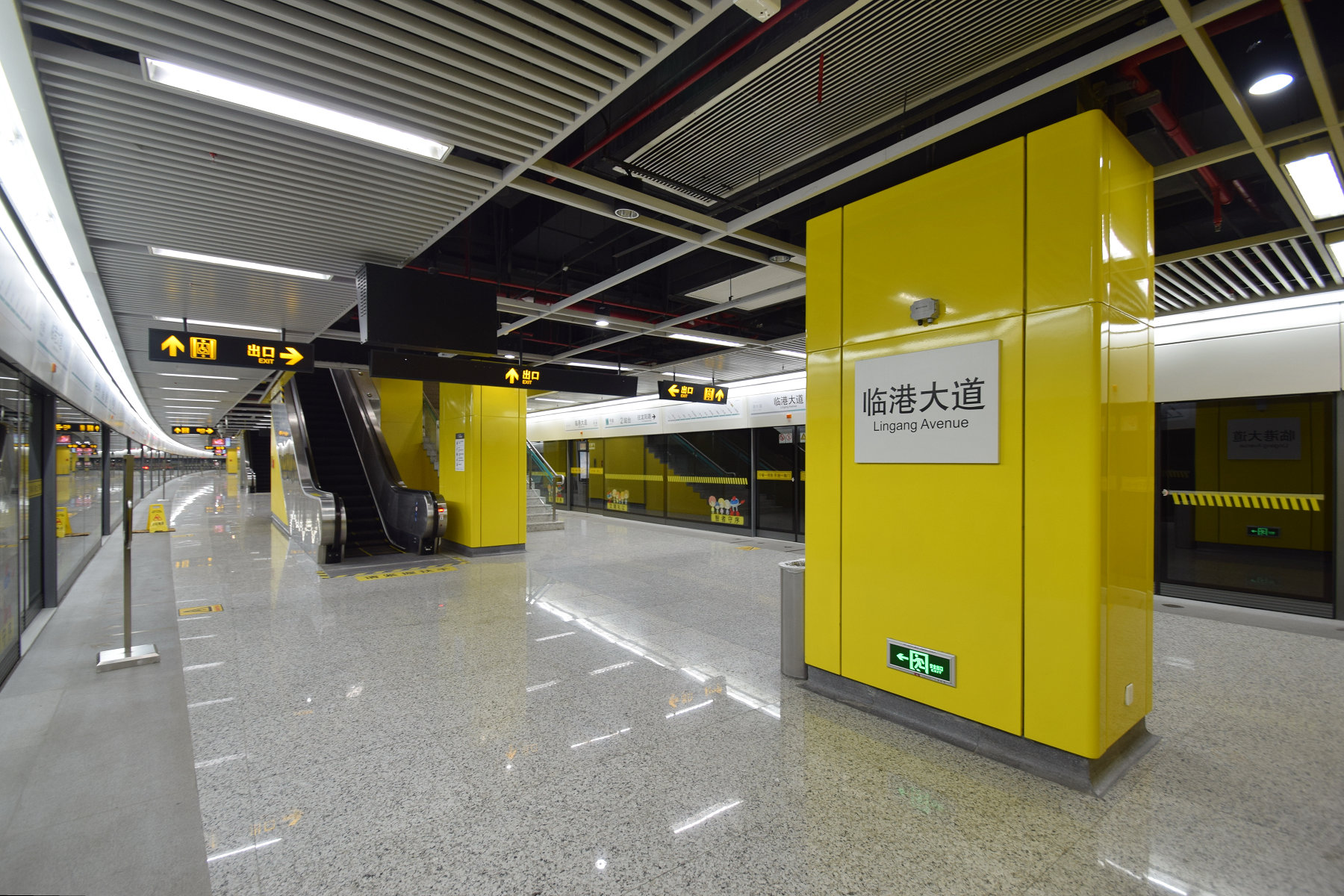
Line 16 platform of Lingang Avenue

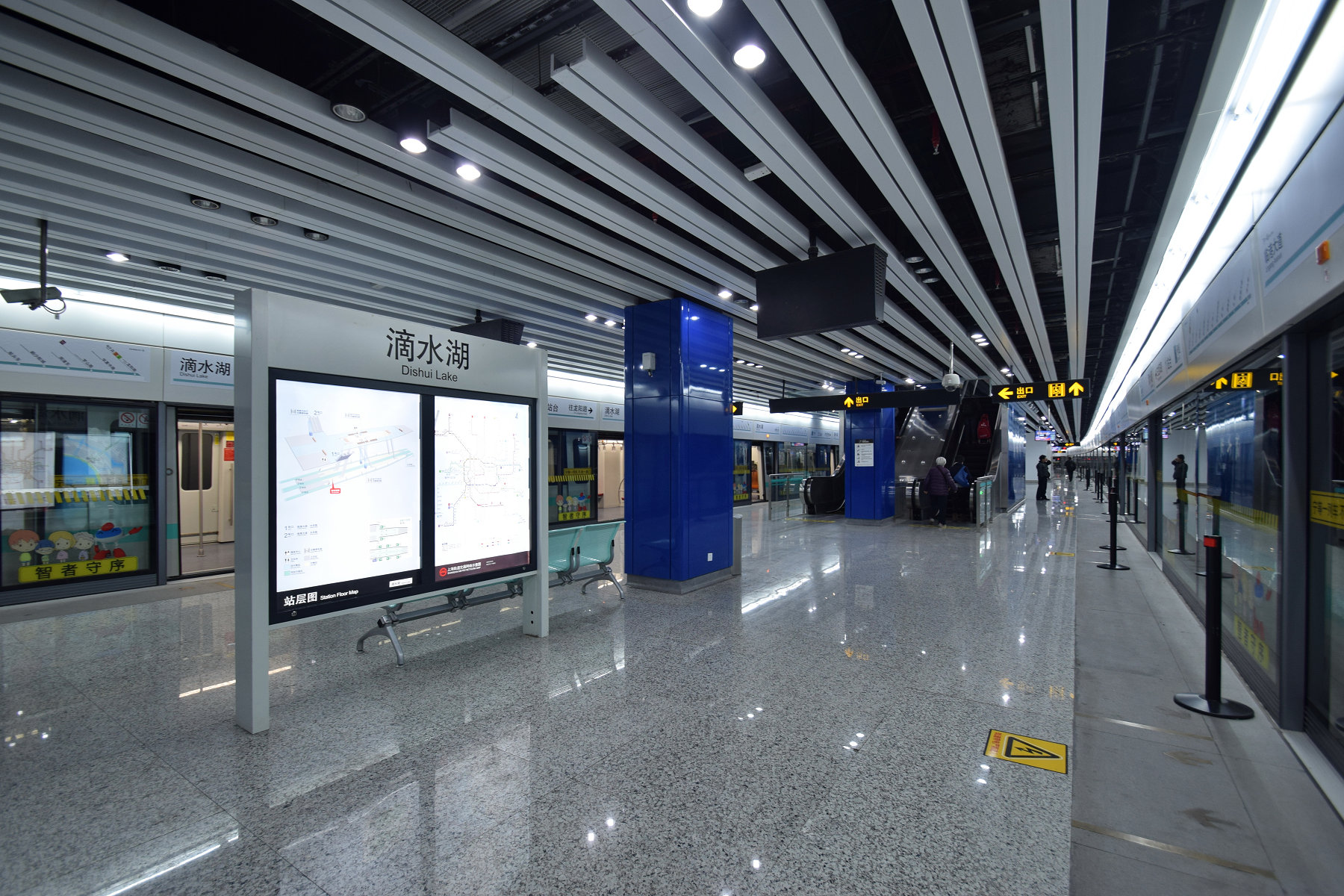
Line 16 platform of Dishui Lake

== Line 17 ==
Service Routes		Station Name		Opened	Location	Platform Level	Type of Platform	Transfers
Mainline	Rush hour	English	Chinese (S)	Opened	Location	Platform Level	Type of Platform	Transfers
●	●	Hongqiao Railway Station	虹桥火车站	30 December 2017	Minhang	Underground	Double island platform	2 10; Airport Link; Hongqiao
●	●	National Exhibition and Convention Center	国家会展中心	30 December 2017	Qingpu	Underground	Island platform	2
●	●	Panlong Road	蟠龙路	30 December 2017	Qingpu	Underground	Island platform	
●	●	Xuying Road	徐盈路	30 December 2017	Qingpu	Elevated	Island platform	
●	●	Xujingbeicheng	徐泾北城	30 December 2017	Qingpu	Elevated	Island platform	
●	●	Middle Jiasong Road	嘉松中路	30 December 2017	Qingpu	Elevated	Side platform	
●	●	Zhaoxiang	赵巷	30 December 2017	Qingpu	Elevated	Side platform	
●	●	Huijin Road	汇金路	30 December 2017	Qingpu	Underground	Side platform	
●	●	Qingpu Xincheng	青浦新城	30 December 2017	Qingpu	Underground	Island platform	
●	●	Caoying Road	漕盈路	30 December 2017	Qingpu	Underground	Island platform	
●	●	Dianshanhu Avenue	淀山湖大道	30 December 2017	Qingpu	Underground	Island platform	
●		Zhujiajiao	朱家角	30 December 2017	Qingpu	Elevated	Island platform	
●		Oriental Land	东方绿舟	30 December 2017	Qingpu	Elevated	Island platform	
●		Xicen	西岑	30 November 2024	Qingpu	Elevated	Island platform	

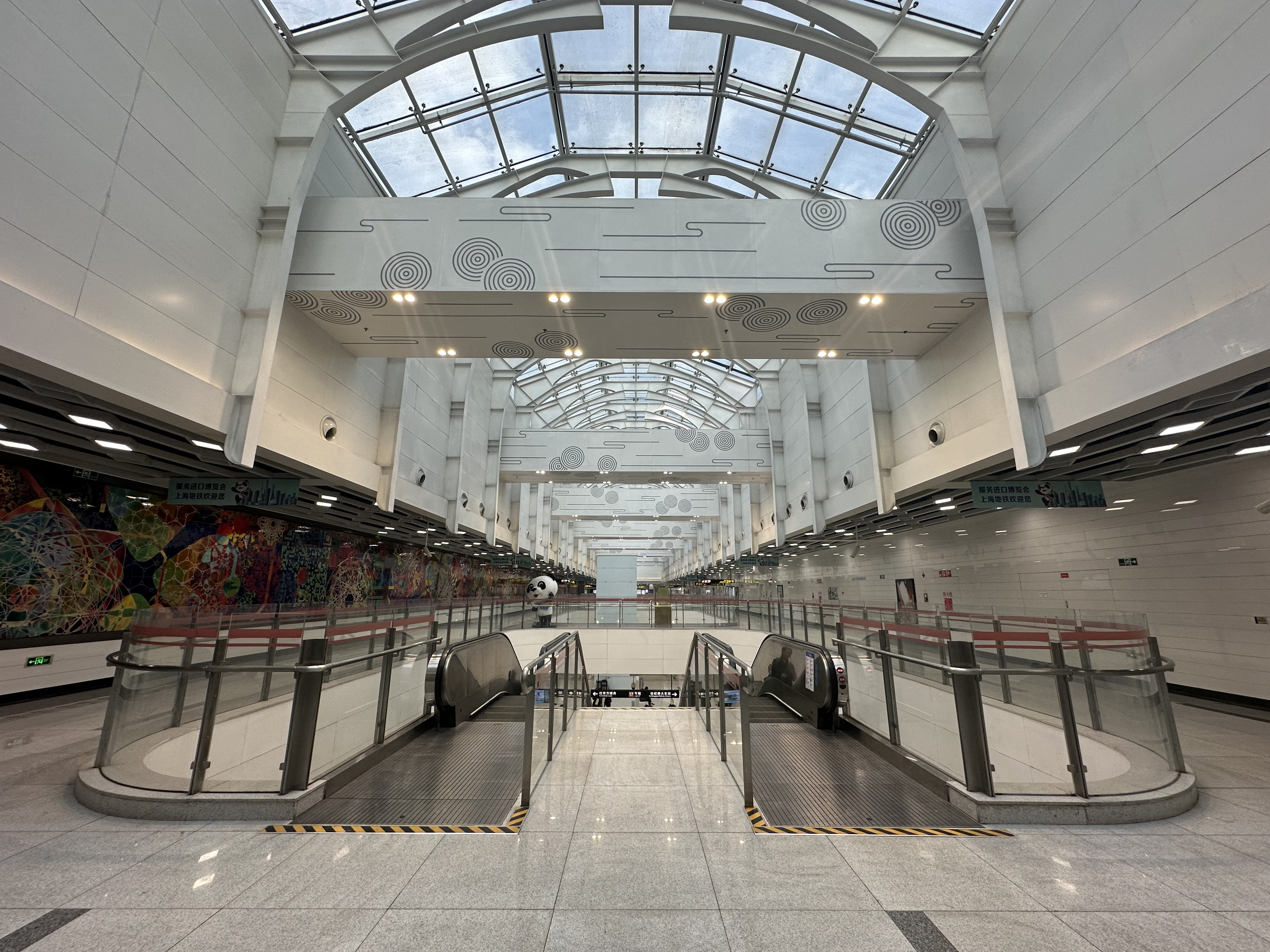
Line 17 concourse of National Exhibition and Convention Center

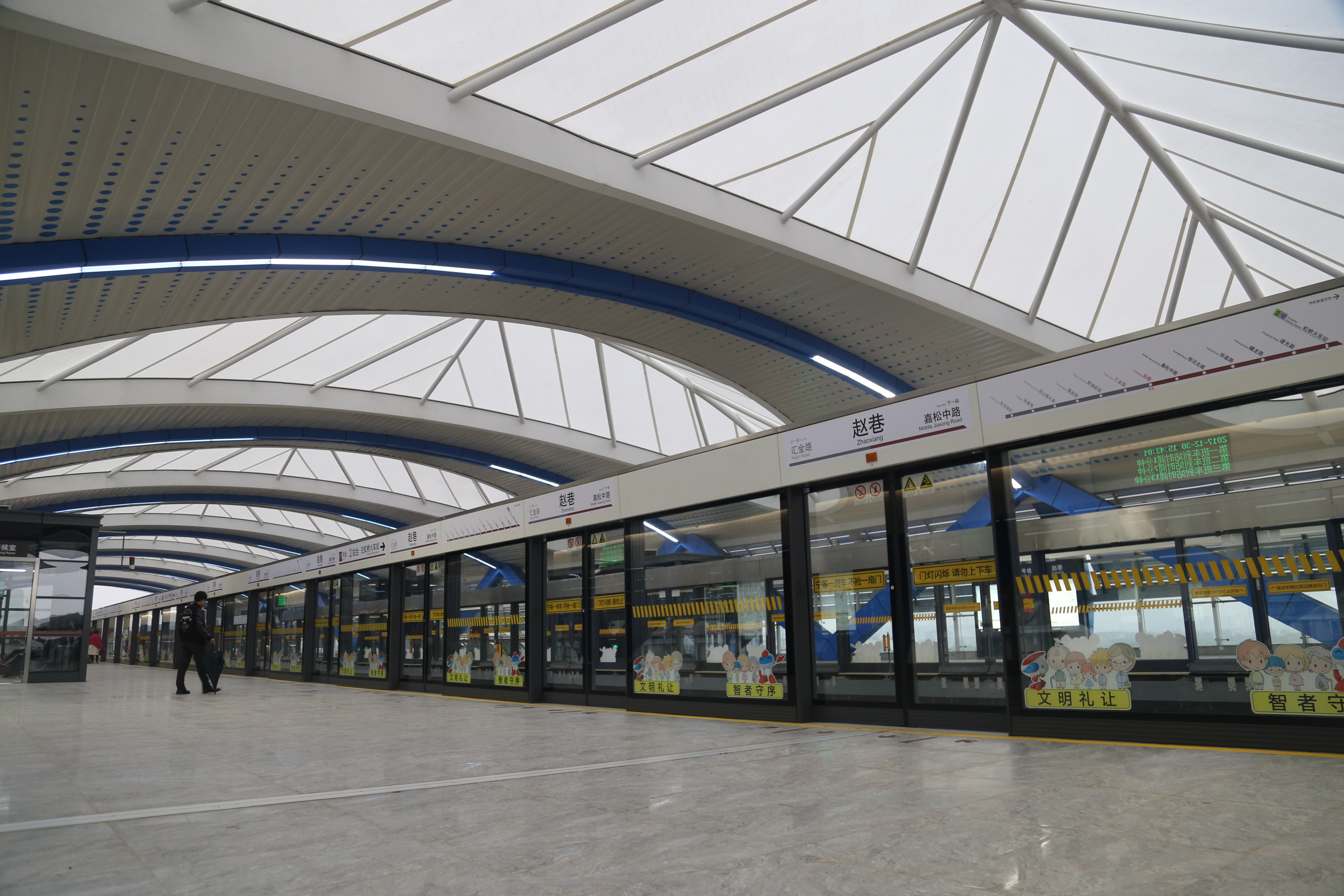
Line 17 platform of Zhaoxiang

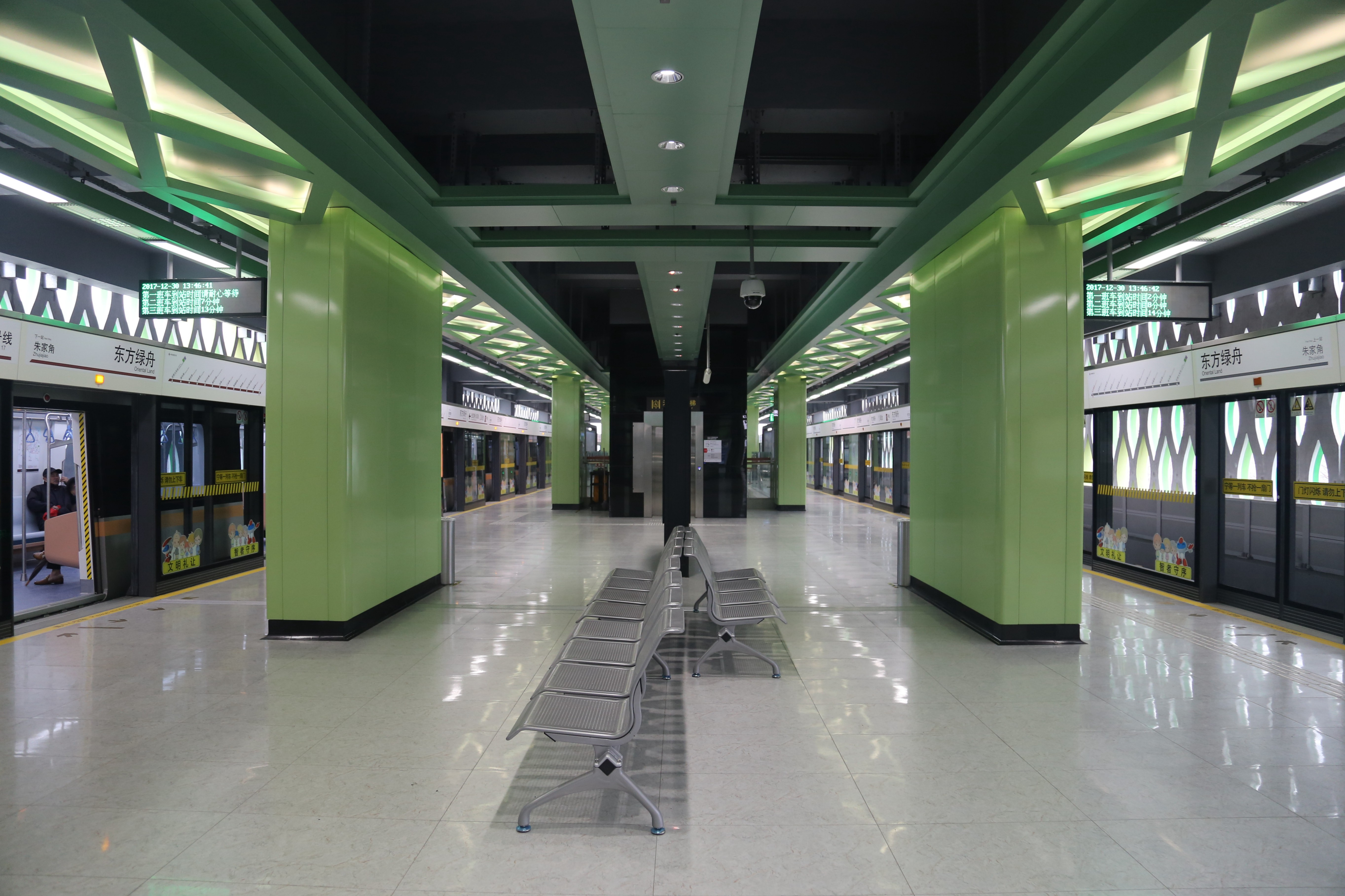
Line 17 platform of Oriental Land

== Line 18 ==
Service Routes		Station Name		Opened	Location	Platform Level	Type of Platform	Transfers
Service Routes		English	Chinese (S)	Opened	Location	Platform Level	Type of Platform	Transfers
●		Kangwen Road	康文路	27 December 2025	Baoshan	Underground	Island platform	
●		Hulan Road	呼兰路	27 December 2025	Baoshan	Underground	Island platform	1
●		Aihui Road	爱辉路	27 December 2025	Baoshan	Underground	Island platform	
●		West Changjiang Road	长江西路	27 December 2025	Baoshan	Underground	Island platform	
●		Tongnan Road	通南路	27 December 2025	Baoshan	Underground	Island platform	
●	●	South Changjiang Road	长江南路	30 December 2021	Baoshan	Underground	Island platform	3
●	●	Yingao Road	殷高路	30 December 2021	Baoshan	Underground	Island platform	
●	●	Shanghai University of Finance and Economics	上海财经大学	30 December 2021	Yangpu	Underground	Island platform	
●	●	Fudan University	复旦大学	30 December 2021	Yangpu	Underground	Island platform	
●	●	Guoquan Road	国权路	30 December 2021	Yangpu	Underground	Island platform	10
●	●	Fushun Road	抚顺路	30 December 2021	Yangpu	Underground	Island platform	
●	●	Jiangpu Road	江浦路	30 December 2021	Yangpu	Underground	Island platform	8
●	●	Jiangpu Park	江浦公园	30 December 2021	Yangpu	Underground	Island platform	12
●	●	Pingliang Road	平凉路	30 December 2021	Yangpu	Underground	One side platform and one island platform	
●	●	Danyang Road	丹阳路	30 December 2021	Yangpu	Underground	Island platform	
●	●	Changyi Road	昌邑路	30 December 2021	Pudong	Underground	Island platform	14
●	●	Minsheng Road	民生路	30 December 2021	Pudong	Underground	Island platform	6
●	●	Middle Yanggao Road	杨高中路	30 December 2021	Pudong	Underground	Island platform	9
●	●	Yingchun Road	迎春路	30 December 2021	Pudong	Underground	Island platform	
●	●	Longyang Road	龙阳路	30 December 2021	Pudong	Underground	Island platform	2 7 16 Maglev
●	●	Fangxin Road	芳芯路	30 December 2021	Pudong	Underground	Island platform	
●	●	Beizhong Road	北中路	30 December 2021	Pudong	Underground	Island platform	
●	●	Lianxi Road	莲溪路	30 December 2021	Pudong	Underground	Island platform	13
●	●	Yuqiao	御桥	26 December 2020	Pudong	Underground	One side platform and one island platform	11
●	●	Kangqiao	康桥	26 December 2020	Pudong	Underground	Island platform	
●	●	Zhoupu	周浦	26 December 2020	Pudong	Underground	Island platform	
●	●	Fanrong Road	繁荣路	26 December 2020	Pudong	Underground	Island platform	
●	●	Shenmei Road	沈梅路	26 December 2020	Pudong	Underground	Island platform	
●		Hetao Road	鹤涛路	26 December 2020	Pudong	Underground	Island platform	
●		Xiasha	下沙	26 December 2020	Pudong	Underground	Island platform	
●		Hangtou	航头	26 December 2020	Pudong	Underground	Island platform	

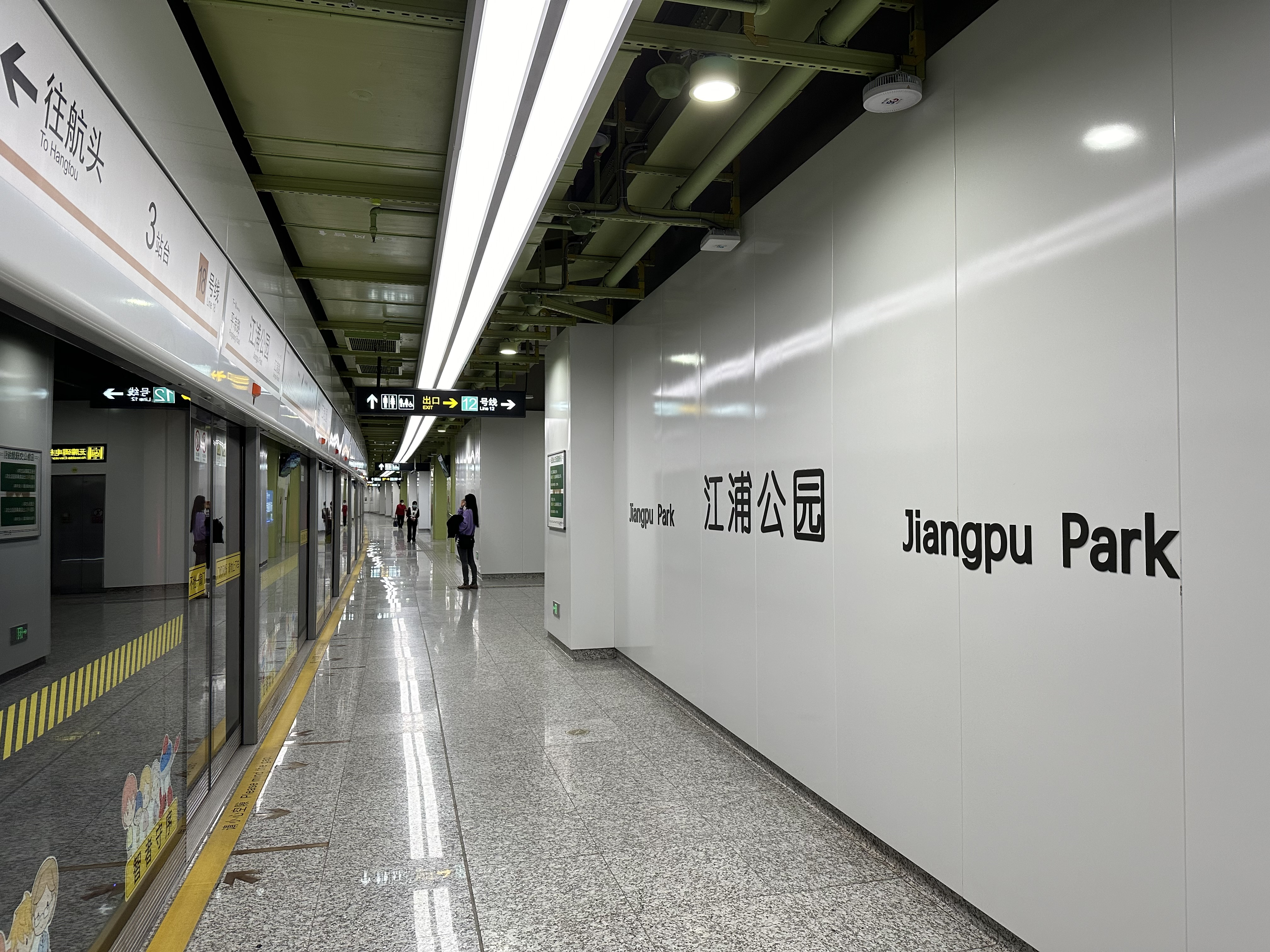
Line 18 platform of Jiangpu Park

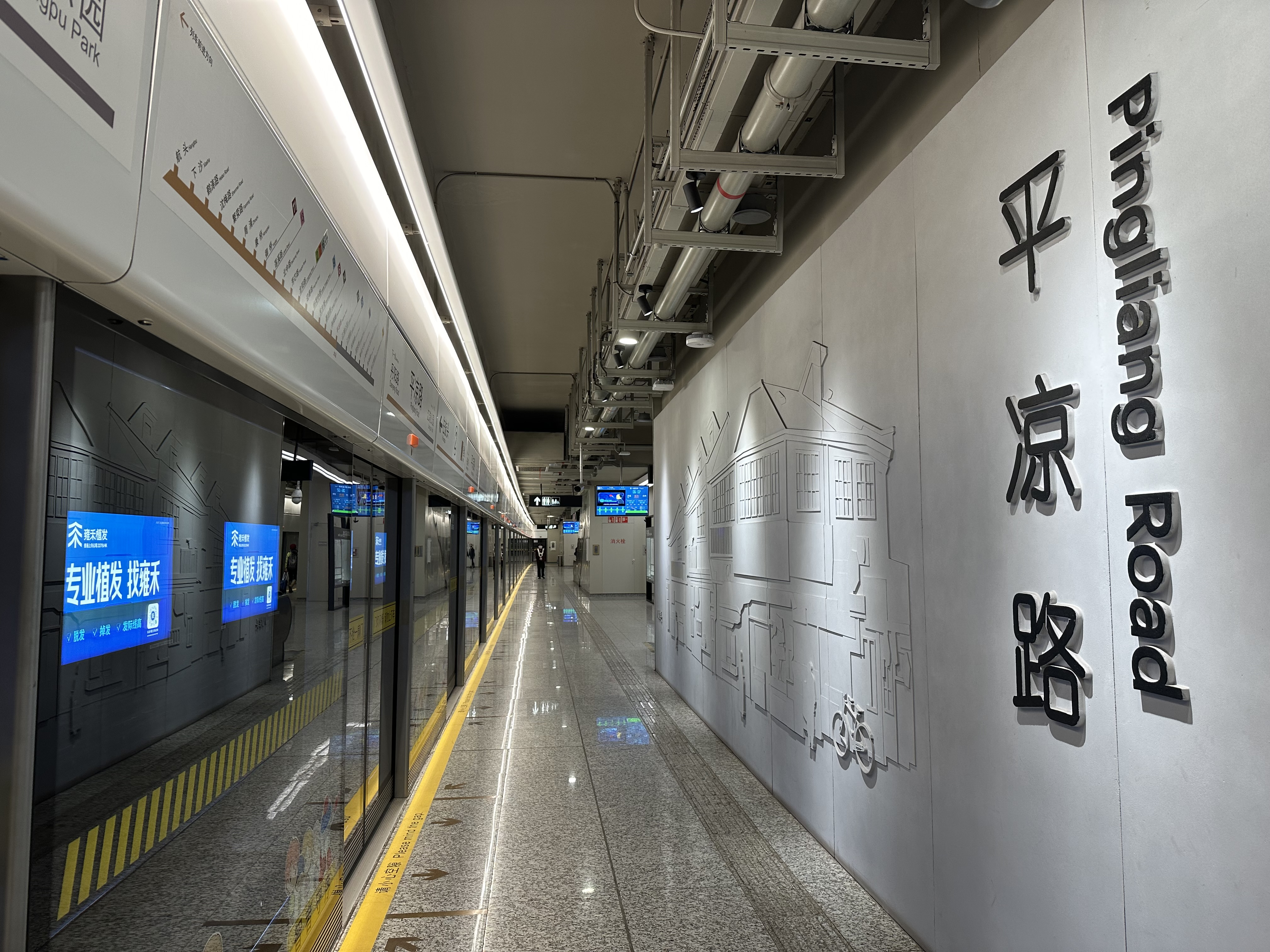
Line 18 platform of Pingliang Road

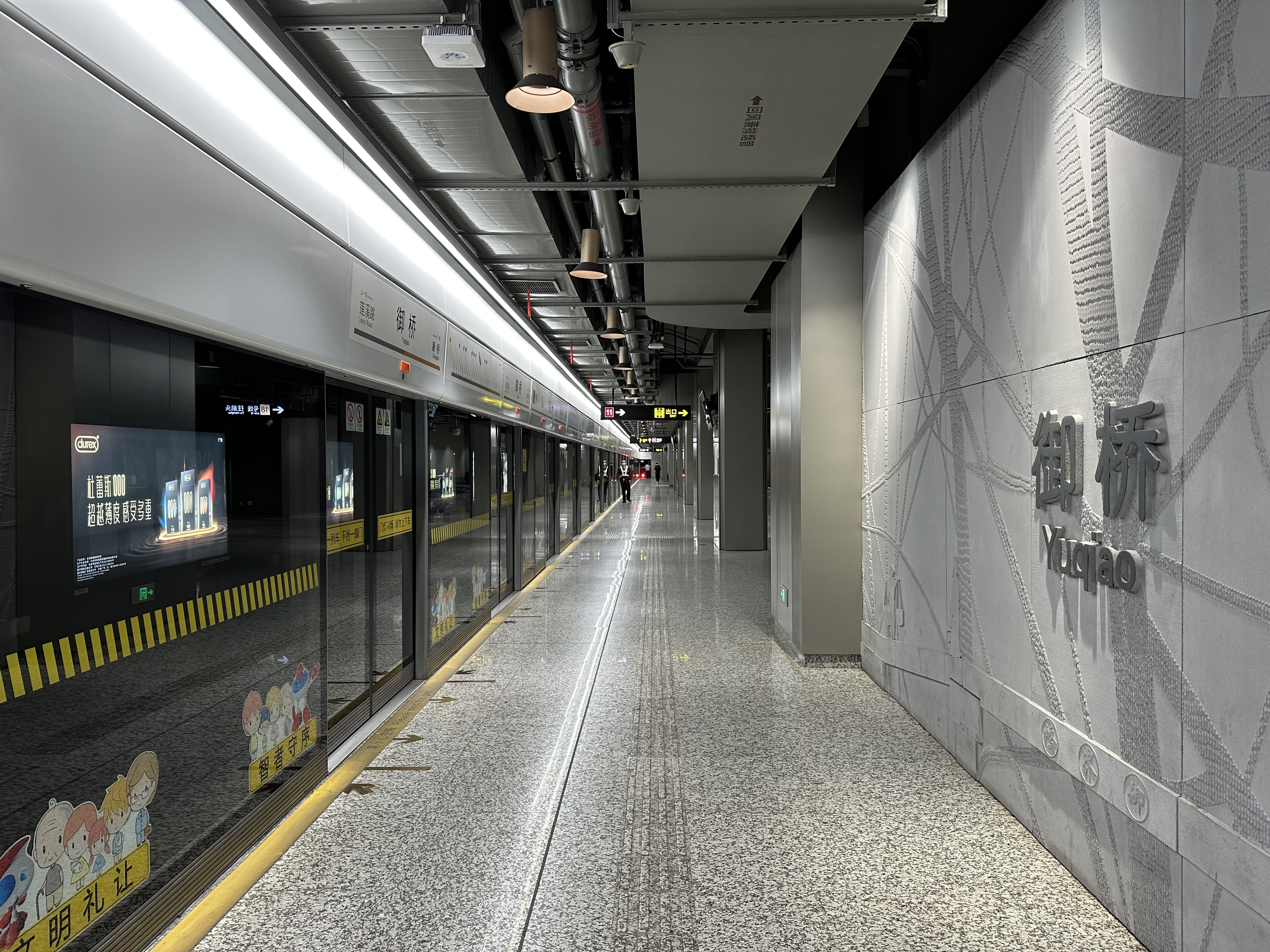
Line 18 platform of Yuqiao

== Pujiang line ==
Station Name		Opened	Location	Platform Level	Type of Platform	Transfers
English	Chinese (S)	Opened	Location	Platform Level	Type of Platform	Transfers
Shendu Highway	沈杜公路	31 March 2018	Minhang	Elevated	One island platform & Two side platform	8
Sanlu Highway	三鲁公路	31 March 2018	Minhang	Elevated	Side platform	
Minrui Road	闵瑞路	31 March 2018	Minhang	Elevated	Side platform	
Puhang Road	浦航路	31 March 2018	Minhang	Elevated	Side platform	
Dongchengyi Road	东城一路	31 March 2018	Minhang	Elevated	Side platform	
Huizhen Road	汇臻路	31 March 2018	Minhang	Elevated	Island platform	

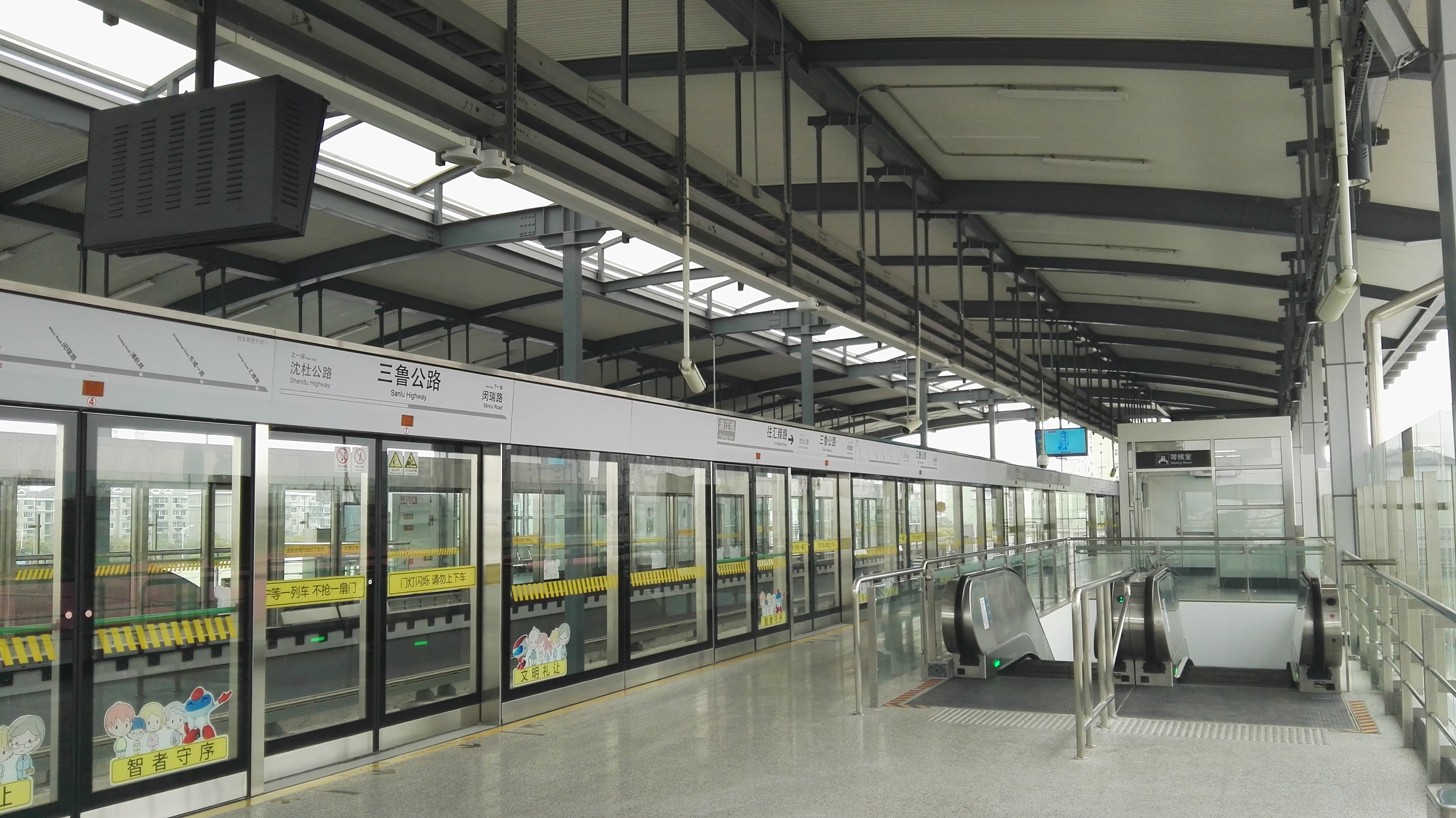
Pujiang line platform of Sanlu Highway

== Station name changes ==
In October 2006 a new convention to naming metro stations was implemented. Station names should refer to famous streets or sights nearby rather than the vertical street neighbouring the station, making it easier for visitors to find these places. It is common for station names to change before opening, for example China Art Museum station was known as Zhoujiadu during planning. The following stations have changed names after opening.

Changes of station name in the Shanghai metro system
Date	Old station name	New station name	Lines	Notes
19 Apr 2000	Pudong Central Park	Century Park	2
19 Aug 2000	People's Park	People's Square	1 2	Currently also served by 8 .
26 Dec 2000	Xinlonghua	Shanghai South Railway Station	1	Changed at the opening of 3 . Currently also served by 15 .
1 May 2001	Hongmei Road	Jinjiang Park	1	Was originally also named Jinjiang Park in 1995. With the extension of line 1 on 28 December 1996 it was renamed to use the standardize road name. In 2001 the name change was reversed again.
12 Dec 2001	South Yanggao Road	Shanghai Science and Technology Museum	2
28 Oct 2006	Shimen No. 1 Road	West Nanjing Road	2	Currently also served by 12 and 13 .
28 Oct 2006	Middle Henan Road	East Nanjing Road	2	Currently also served by 10 .
28 Oct 2006	East Wenshui Road	Dabaishu	3
28 Oct 2006	Dongfang Road	Century Avenue	2 4 6 9	Changed at the opening of 4 . Currently also served by 6 and 9 .
7 May 2011	Jiyang Road	Oriental Sports Center	6 8	Currently also served by 11 .
6 Jun 2012	Chuanchang Road	Middle Longhua Road	7	Currently also served by 12 .
31 Aug 2013	Aerospace Museum	Shendu Highway	8	Currently also served by Pujiang .
19 Dec 2015	Lupu Bridge	World Expo Museum	13	The station was known as Lupu Bridge from 20 April 2010 to 2 November 2010 when it opened as part of the Expo 2010 line. When the station reopened as part of the full line 13 in 2015, it was renamed.
2020	West Shanghai Railway Station	Shanghai West Railway Station	11	Currently also served by 15 .
20 Jun 2021	South Huangpi Road	Site of the First CPC National Congress · South Huangpi Road	1	Name change to honour first National Congress as part of the 100th anniversary of CCP.
20 Jun 2021	Xintiandi	Site of the First CPC National Congress · Xintiandi	10 13	Name change to honour first National Congress as part of the 100th anniversary of CCP.
22 Sep 2024	East Xujing	National Exhibition and Convention Center	2
22 Sep 2024	Dongchang Road	South Pudong Road	2	It was also served 14 before it changed.
22 Sep 2024	Pudong International Airport	Pudong Airport Terminal 1&2	2
22 Sep 2024	Pudian Road	Xiangcheng Road	4	Not the Pudian Road of 6 .
22 Sep 2024	Yuanshen Stadium	Yuanshen Sports Center	6
22 Sep 2024	Songjiang South Railway Station	Shanghai Songjiang Railway Station	9
22 Sep 2024	West Huajing	Jinghong Road	15
22 Sep 2024	Zhuguang Road	National Exhibition and Convention Center	17

== Interchange stations ==
As of 2024 there are 85 interchange stations of which 11 interchange between three lines and 2 interchange between four lines.

Interchange stations within Shanghai metro network
Station	Line	Date	Line	Date	Line	Date	Line	Date	Notes
Caobao Road	1	28 May 1993	12	19 Dec 2015					
Caoyang Road	3 4	26 Dec 2000	11	31 Dec 2009	14	30 Dec 2021			Lines 3 and 4 (opened on 31 Dec 2005) share the same track. Virtual interchange between lines 3/4/11 and line 14.
Century Avenue	2	20 Sep 1999	4	28 Oct 2006	6	29 Dec 2007	9	31 Dec 2009	First four-line interchange metro or subway station in mainland China. First three-line interchange metro station in Shanghai.
Changqing Road	7	5 Dec 2009	13	30 Dec 2018					Virtual interchange station; transfer channel under construction.
Changshou Road	7	5 Dec 2009	13	28 Dec 2014					
Changshu Road	1	10 Apr 1995	7	5 Dec 2009					
Changyi Road	14	30 Dec 2021	18	30 Dec 2021					
Chengshan Road	8	5 Jul 2009	13	30 Dec 2018					
Daduhe Road	13	1 Nov 2014	15	23 Jan 2021					
Dalian Road	4	31 Dec 2005	12	29 Dec 2013					
Damuqiao Road	4	31 Dec 2005	12	19 Dec 2015					
Dashijie	8	29 Dec 2007	14	30 Dec 2021					
Dong'an Road	4	31 Dec 2005	7	5 Dec 2009					
Dongming Road	6	29 Dec 2007	13	30 Dec 2018					
East Nanjing Road	2	20 Sep 1999	10	10 Apr 2010					
Gangcheng Road	6	29 Dec 2007	10	26 Dec 2020					
Gucun Park	7	28 Dec 2010	15	23 Jan 2021					
Guilin Park	12	19 Dec 2015	15	23 Jan 2021					
Guilin Road	9	29 Dec 2007	15	27 Jun 2021					
Guoquan Road	10	10 Apr 2010	18	30 Dec 2021					
Hailun Road	4	31 Dec 2005	10	10 Apr 2010					
Hanzhong Road	1	10 Apr 1995	12	19 Dec 2015	13	19 Dec 2015			
Hongkou Football Stadium	3	26 Dec 2000	8	29 Dec 2007					Formally virtual interchange station between 1 Jun 2008 and 21 Oct 2012.
Hongqiao Airport Terminal 2	2	16 Mar 2010	10	30 Nov 2010					In-station transfer only (on the same platform) for East Nanjing Road direction since 30 Dec 2017.
Hongqiao Railway Station	2	1 Jul 2010	10	30 Nov 2010	17	30 Dec 2017			
Hongqiao Road	3 4	26 Dec 2000	10	10 Apr 2010					Lines 3 and 4 (opened on 31 Dec 2005) share the same track.
Jiangpu Park	12	29 Dec 2013	18	30 Dec 2021					
Jiangpu Road	8	29 Dec 2007	18	30 Dec 2021					
Jiangsu Road	2	20 Sep 1999	11	31 Dec 2009					
Jiao Tong University	10	10 Apr 2010	11	31 Aug 2013					
Jiashan Road	9	31 Dec 2009	12	19 Dec 2015					
Jing'an Temple	2	20 Sep 1999	7	5 Dec 2009	14	30 Dec 2021			
Jinhai Road	12	29 Dec 2013	9	30 Dec 2017					
Jinshajiang Road	3 4	26 Dec 2000	13	30 Dec 2012					Lines 3 and 4 (opened on 31 Dec 2005) share the same track.
Jufeng Road	6	29 Dec 2007	12	29 Dec 2013					
Lancun Road	4	31 Dec 2005	6	29 Dec 2007					
Lantian Road	9	30 Dec 2017	14	30 Dec 2021					
Laoximen	8	29 Dec 2007	10	10 Apr 2010					
Lianxi Road	13	30 Dec 2018	18	30 Dec 2021					
Longcao Road	3	26 Dec 2000	12	19 Dec 2015					
Longde Road	11	31 Dec 2009	13	28 Dec 2014					
Longhua	11	31 Aug 2013	12	19 Dec 2015					Formally virtual interchange station until 30 Dec 2018.
Longyang Road	2	20 Sep 1999	7	5 Dec 2009	16	28 Dec 2014	18	30 Dec 2021	
Loushanguan Road	2	30 Dec 2006	15	23 Jan 2021					Formally virtual interchange station until 31 Dec 2024.
Lujiabang Road	8	29 Dec 2007	9	31 Dec 2009					
Lujiazui	2	20 Sep 1999	14	30 Dec 2021					
Luoshan Road	11	31 Aug 2013	16	29 Dec 2013					
Madang Road	9	31 Dec 2009	13	19 Dec 2015					The station was a temporary interchange during Expo 2010 (20 Apr to 2 Nov 2010).
Middle Huaxia Road	13	28 Dec 2014	16	30 Dec 2018					
Middle Longhua Road	7	5 Dec 2009	12	19 Dec 2015					
Middle Yanggao Road	9	7 Apr 2010	18	30 Dec 2021					
Minsheng Road	6	29 Dec 2007	18	30 Dec 2021					
National Exhibition and Convention Center	2	16 Mar 2010	17	30 Dec 2017					Both station names were combined as one on 21 September 2024. Although it's de jure defined as out-of-system transfer station, virtual transfer via cards isn't available until open of the station of line 13, but after that day, the in-system transfer will be implemented instead.
Oriental Sports Center	6	20 Apr 2010	8	20 Apr 2010	11	31 Aug 2013			
People's Square	1	10 Apr 1995	2	20 Sep 1999	8	29 Dec 2007			First interchange metro station in Shanghai. First three-line interchange metro station in Shanghai.
Pudong Avenue	4	31 Dec 2005	14	30 Dec 2021					
Qufu Road	8	29 Dec 2007	12	10 May 2014					
Shanghai Indoor Stadium	1	28 May 1993	4	31 Dec 2005					
Shanghai Railway Station	1	10 Apr 1995	3 4	26 Dec 2000					Virtual interchange between line 1 and lines 3/4 since 1 Jun 2008; The line 1 platform is in the South square while platforms for lines 3/4 are in the North square, thus these platforms are technically separate stations. Lines 3 and 4 (opened on 31 Dec 2005) share the same track.
Shanghai South Railway Station	1	28 May 1993	3	26 Dec 2000	15	23 Jan 2021			
Shanghai West Railway Station	11	31 Dec 2009	15	23 Jan 2021					
Shendu Highway	8	5 Jul 2009	Pujiang	31 Mar 2018					
Siping Road	8	29 Dec 2007	10	10 Apr 2010					
Site of the First CPC National Congress · South Huangpi Road	1	10 Apr 1995	14	30 Dec 2021					
Site of the First CPC National Congress · Xintiandi	10	10 Apr 2010	13	19 Dec 2015					
South Changjiang Road	3	18 Dec 2006	18	30 Dec 2021					
South Pudong Road	2	20 Sep 1999	14	30 Dec 2021					Both station names were combined as one on 21 September 2024.
South Shaanxi Road	1	10 Apr 1995	10	10 Apr 2010	12	19 Dec 2015			Formally virtual interchange station between lines 1 and 10 until 19 Dec 2015.
South Xizang Road	4	29 Dec 2007	8	29 Dec 2007					
Tiantong Road	10	10 Apr 2010	12	29 Dec 2013					
Tongchuan Road	15	23 Jan 2021	14	30 Dec 2021					
West Gaoke Road	6	29 Dec 2007	7	5 Dec 2009					
West Nanjing Road	2	20 Sep 1999	12	19 Dec 2015	13	19 Dec 2015			Virtual interchange; transfer channel planned.
Wuning Road	13	28 Dec 2014	14	30 Dec 2021					
Xinzhuang	1	28 Dec 1996	5	25 Nov 2003					
Xujiahui	1	28 May 1993	9	31 Dec 2009	11	31 Aug 2013			Formally virtual interchange station between lines 1 and 9 until 7 Apr 2010.
Yaohua Road	8	29 Dec 2007	7	5 Dec 2009					
Yishan Road	3	26 Dec 2000	4	31 Dec 2005	9	31 Dec 2009			Lines 3 and 4 are on separate tracks. Formally out of system interchange station between lines 3 and 9 between 1 Jun 2008 and 28 Dec 2008. Formally out of system interchange station between lines 3/9 and 4 until 28 Dec 2010.
Yunshan Road	6	29 Dec 2007	14	30 Dec 2021					
Yuqiao	11	31 Aug 2013	18	26 Dec 2020					
Yuyuan Garden	10	10 Apr 2010	14	30 Dec 2021					
Zhaojiabang Road	7	5 Dec 2009	9	31 Dec 2009					
Zhenping Road	3 4	26 Dec 2000	7	5 Dec 2009					Lines 3 and 4 (opened on 31 Dec 2005) share the same track.
Zhenru	11	31 Dec 2011	14	30 Dec 2021					
Zhongshan Park	2	20 Sep 1999	3 4	27 Dec 2000					Lines 3 and 4 (opened on 31 Dec 2005) share the same track.

Lines 3 and 4 share the same track on Baoshan Road, Zhongtan Road and West Yan'an Road and are therefore not considered interchange stations in the list above.

Interchange stations with other transit modes
Station	Metro lines	Other transit modes
Hongqiao Airport Terminal 1	10	SHA
Hongqiao Airport Terminal 2	2 10	SHA
Hongqiao Railway Station	2 10 17	AOH
Longyang Road	2 7 16 18	Maglev
Pudong Airport Terminal 1&2	2	Maglev PVG People Mover West line; PVG People Mover East line; PVG
Shanghai Railway Station	1 3 4	SHH
Shanghai South Railway Station	1 3 15	Jinshan SNH
Shanghai West Railway Station	11 15	SXH
Shanghai Songjiang Railway Station	9	IMH
Zuibaichi Park	9	IMH
Songjiang Sports Center	9	T1 T2
Songjiang University Town	8	T2
Xinzhuang	1 5	XZH
