= Fanrong Road station =

Shanghai Metro station

Fanrong Road 繁荣路
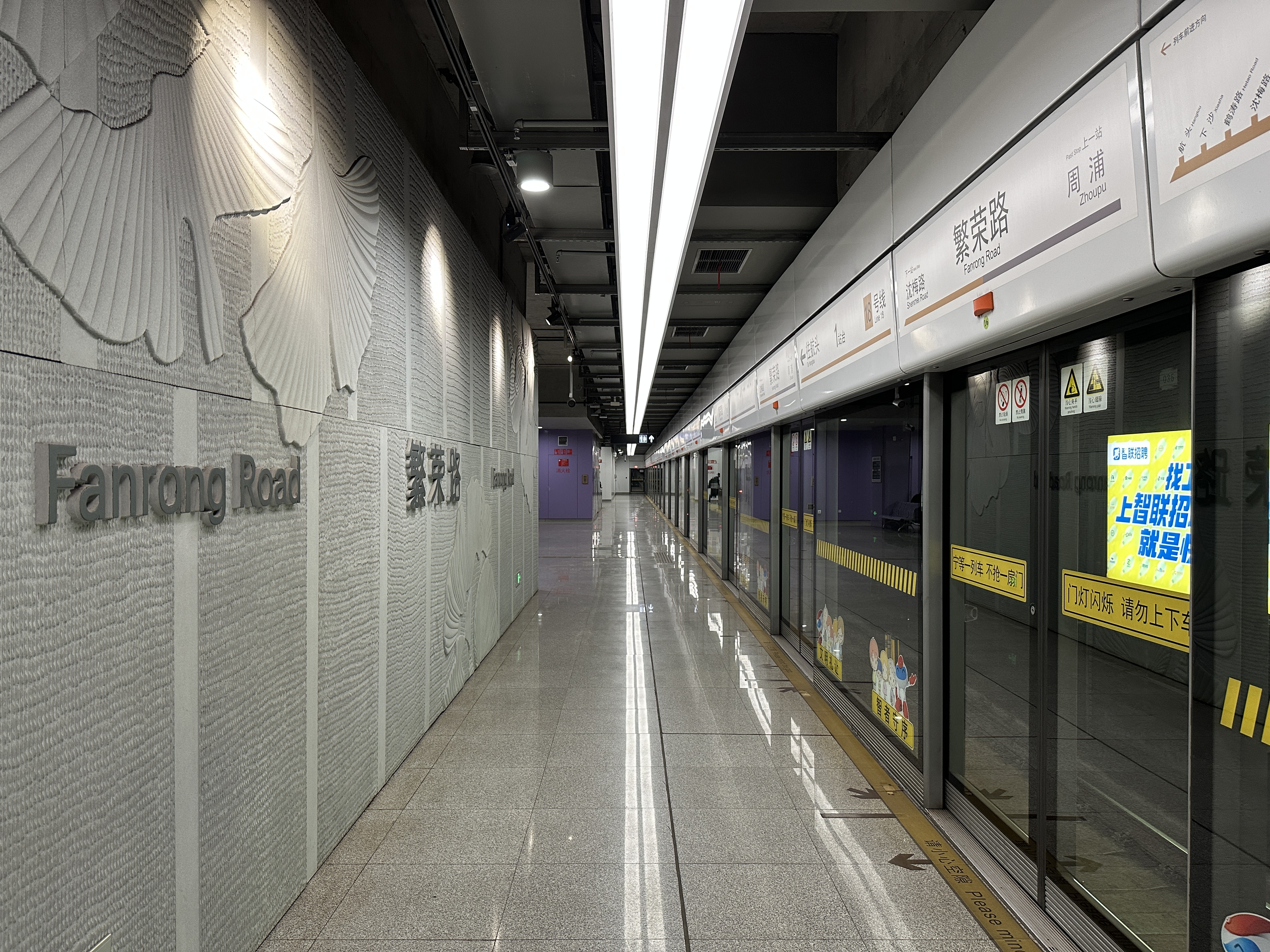

General information
- Location: Fanrong Road and Hunan Highway; Pudong, Shanghai; China
- Coordinates: 31.104599°N 121.566665°E
- Line: Line 18
- Platforms: 2 (1 island platform)
- Tracks: 2

Construction
- Structure type: Underground
- Accessible: Yes

History
- Opened: 26 December 2020

Services
Preceding station	Shanghai Metro	Following station
Zhoupu towards Kangwen Road	Line 18	Shenmei Road towards Hangtou
Location

Fanrong Road (simplified Chinese: 繁荣路; traditional Chinese: 繁榮路; pinyin: Fánróng Lù) is a Shanghai Metro station located on Line 18 in Pudong, Shanghai. Located at the intersection of Fanrong Road and Hunan Highway, the station opened for passenger service on 26 December 2020. It forms part of the first section of Line 18 to become operational, a southern segment of phase one of the line which consists of eight stations between Yuqiao and Hangtou.
