= Hetao Road station =

Shanghai Metro station

Hetao Road 鹤涛路
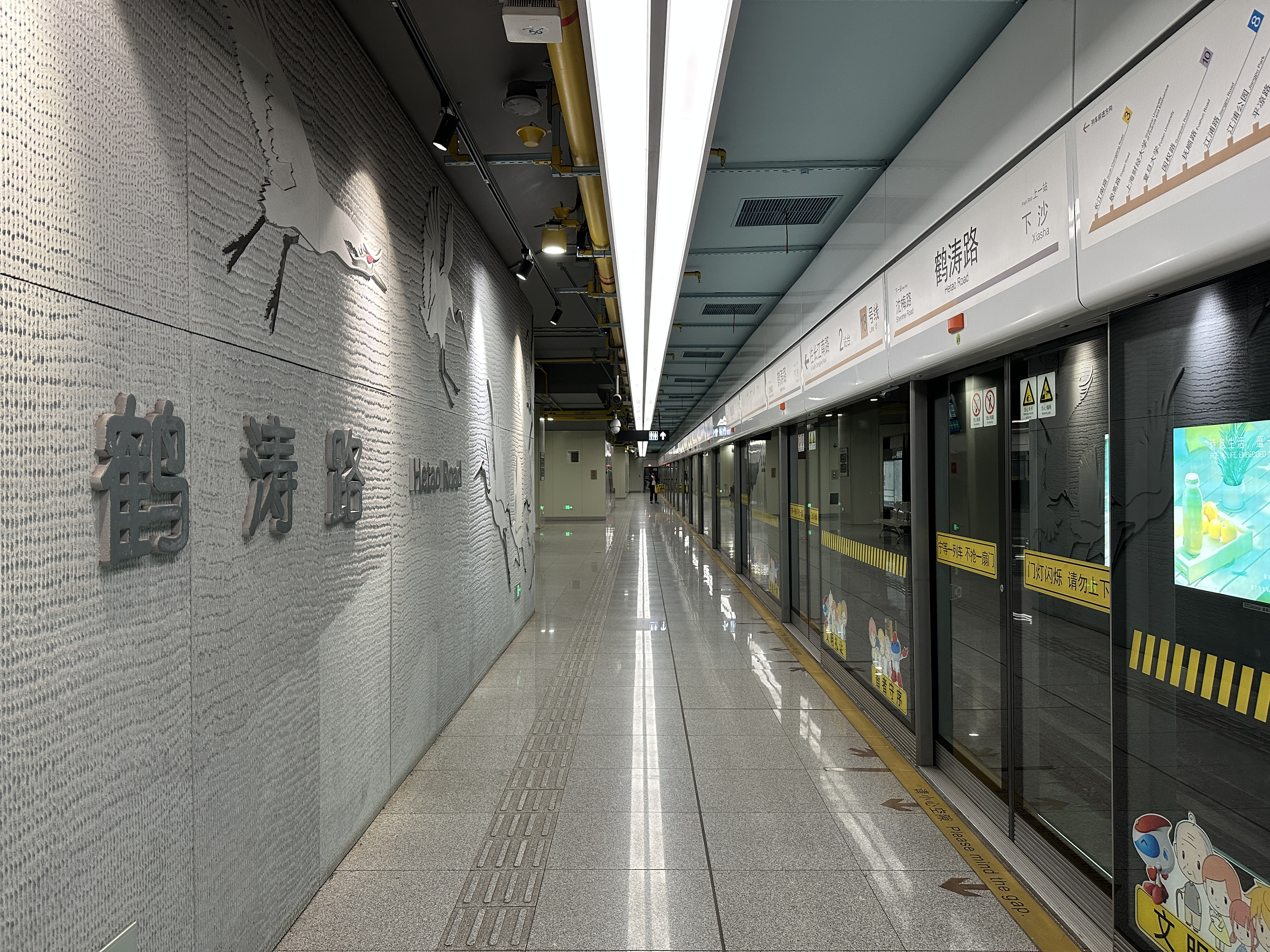

General information
- Location: Hetao Road and Hunan Highway; Pudong, Shanghai; China
- Coordinates: 31.074843°N 121.581731°E
- Line: Line 18
- Platforms: 2 (1 island platform)
- Tracks: 2

Construction
- Structure type: Underground
- Accessible: Yes

History
- Opened: 26 December 2020
- Previous names: Xiayan Road

Services
Preceding station	Shanghai Metro	Following station
Shenmei Road towards Kangwen Road	Line 18	Xiasha towards Hangtou
Location

Hetao Road (simplified Chinese: 鹤涛路; traditional Chinese: 鶴濤路; pinyin: Hètāo Lù), formerly known as Xiayan Road (simplified Chinese: 下盐路; traditional Chinese: 下鹽路; pinyin: Xiàyán Lù), is a Shanghai Metro located on Line 18 in Pudong, Shanghai. Located at the intersection of Hetao Road and Hunan Highway, the station opened on 26 December 2020. It is part of the first section of Line 18 to become operational, a southern segment of phase one of the line which consists of eight stations between Yuqiao and Hangtou.
