= Shenmei Road station =

Shanghai Metro station

Shenmei Road 沈梅路
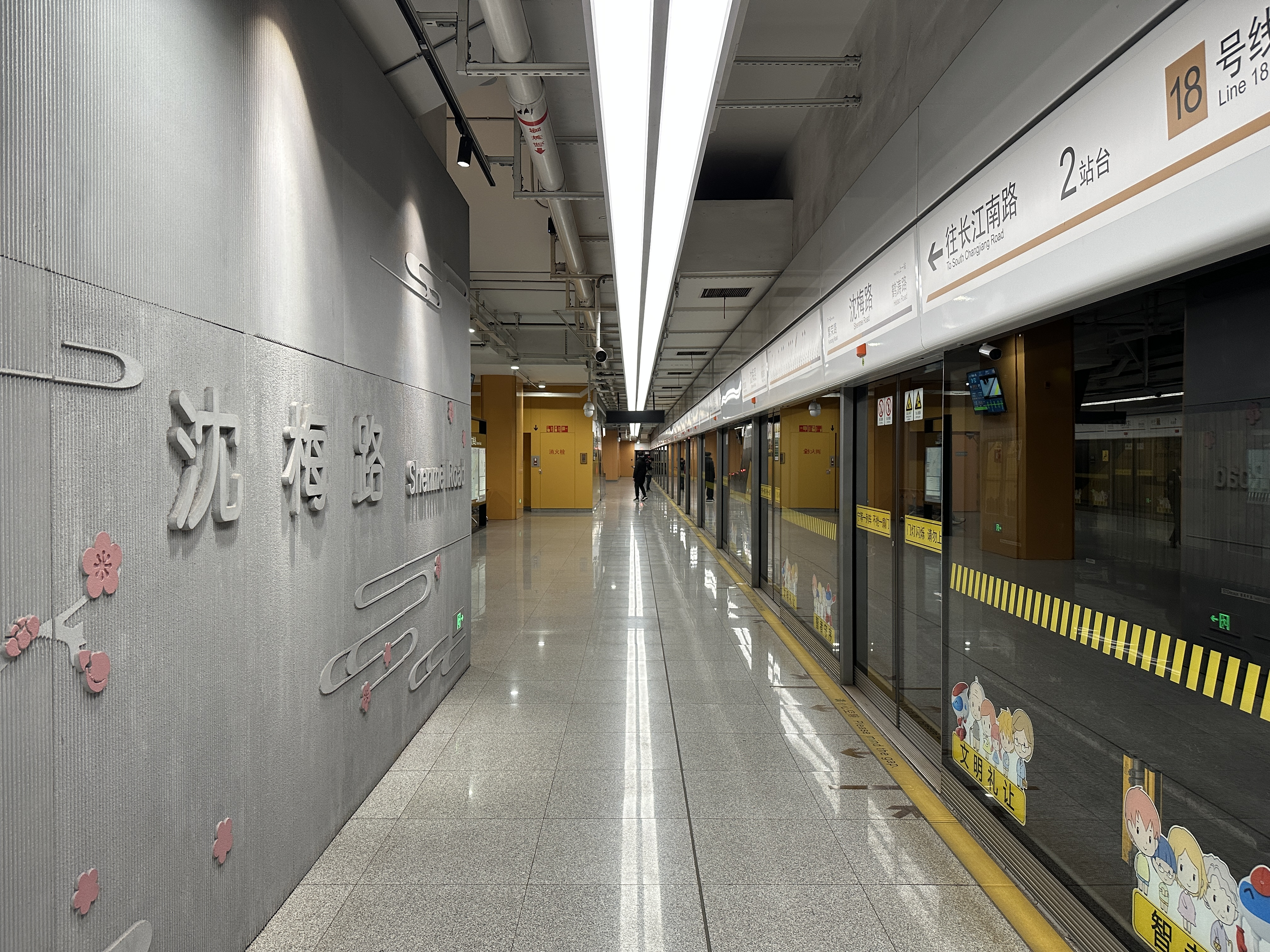

General information
- Location: Shenmei Road and Hunan Highway; Pudong, Shanghai; China
- Coordinates: 31.093584°N 121.576047°E
- Line: Line 18
- Platforms: 2 (1 island platform)
- Tracks: 2

Construction
- Structure type: Underground
- Accessible: Yes

History
- Opened: 26 December 2020

Services
Preceding station	Shanghai Metro	Following station
Fanrong Road towards Kangwen Road	Line 18	Hetao Road towards Hangtou
Location

Shenmei Road (Chinese: 沈梅路; pinyin: Shěnméi Lù) is a Shanghai Metro station located on Line 18 in Pudong, Shanghai. Located at the intersection of Shenmei Road and Hunan Highway, the station opened for passenger service on 26 December 2020. It is part of the first section of Line 18 to become operational, a southern segment of phase one of the line which consists of eight stations between Yuqiao and Hangtou. It is also the terminal station of short-route trains during peak hours.
