= Zhoupu station =

Shanghai Metro station

Zhoupu 周浦
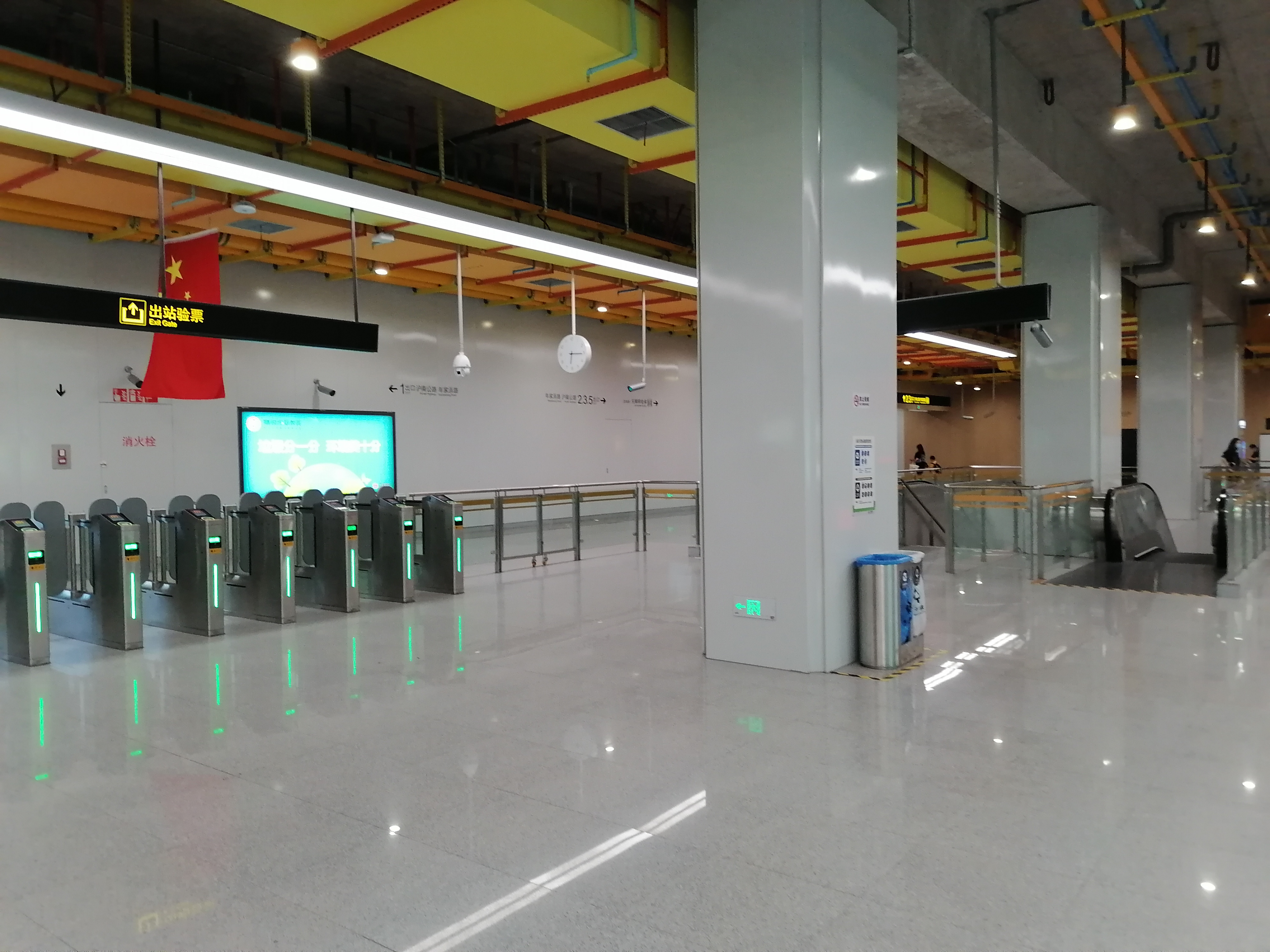
- The station hall of Zhoupu Station

General information
- Location: Nianjiabang Road and Hunan Highway; Pudong, Shanghai; China
- Coordinates: 31.116391°N 121.563415°E
- Line: Line 18
- Platforms: 2 (1 island platform)
- Tracks: 2

Construction
- Structure type: Underground
- Accessible: Yes

History
- Opened: 26 December 2020

Services
Preceding station	Shanghai Metro	Following station
Kangqiao towards Kangwen Road	Line 18	Fanrong Road towards Hangtou
Location

Zhoupu (Chinese: 周浦; pinyin: Zhōupǔ) is a Shanghai Metro station located on Line 18 in the town of Zhoupu, within Pudong, Shanghai. Located at the intersection of Nianjiabang Road and Hunan Highway, the station opened for passenger service on 26 December 2020. It forms part of the first section of Line 18 to become operational, a southern segment of phase one of the line which consists of eight stations between Yuqiao and Hangtou.
