= Fangxin Road station =

Metro station in Shanghai, China

Fangxin Road 芳芯路
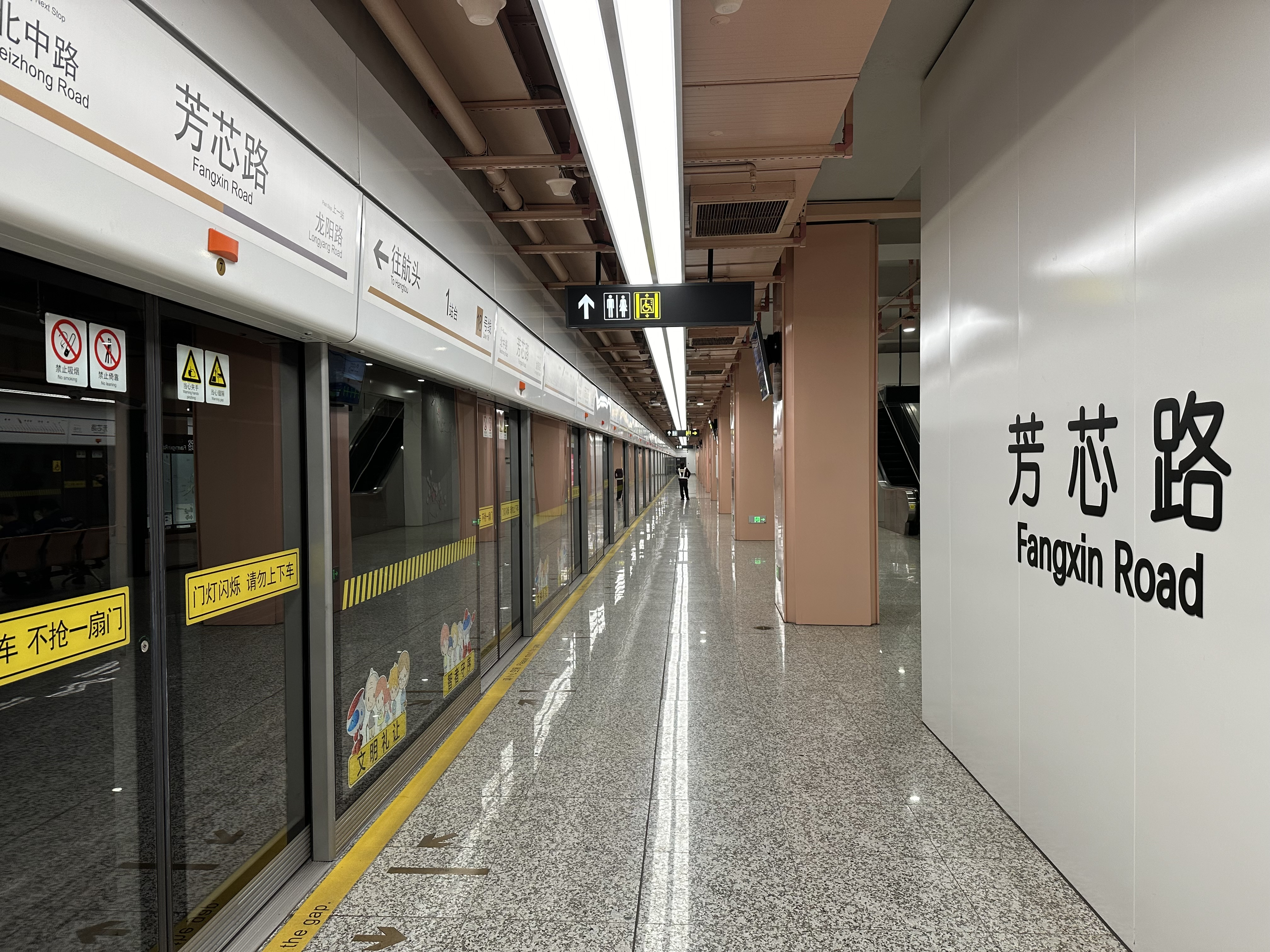
- Station platform

General information
- Location: Fangxin Road and Baiyang Road, Pudong, Shanghai; China
- Coordinates: 31.193519°N 121.554915°E
- Line: Line 18
- Platforms: 2 (1 island platform)
- Tracks: 2

Construction
- Structure type: Underground
- Accessible: Yes

History
- Opened: 30 December 2021

Future services
Preceding station	Shanghai Metro	Following station
Longyang Road towards Kangwen Road	Line 18	Beizhong Road towards Hangtou
Location

Fangxin Road (Chinese: 芳芯路) is a station on Line 18 of the Shanghai Metro. Located at the intersection of Fangxin Road and Baiyang Road in Pudong, Shanghai, the station opened with the rest of phase one of Line 18 in 2021.
