= Yingchun Road station =

Shanghai Metro station

Yingchun Road 迎春路
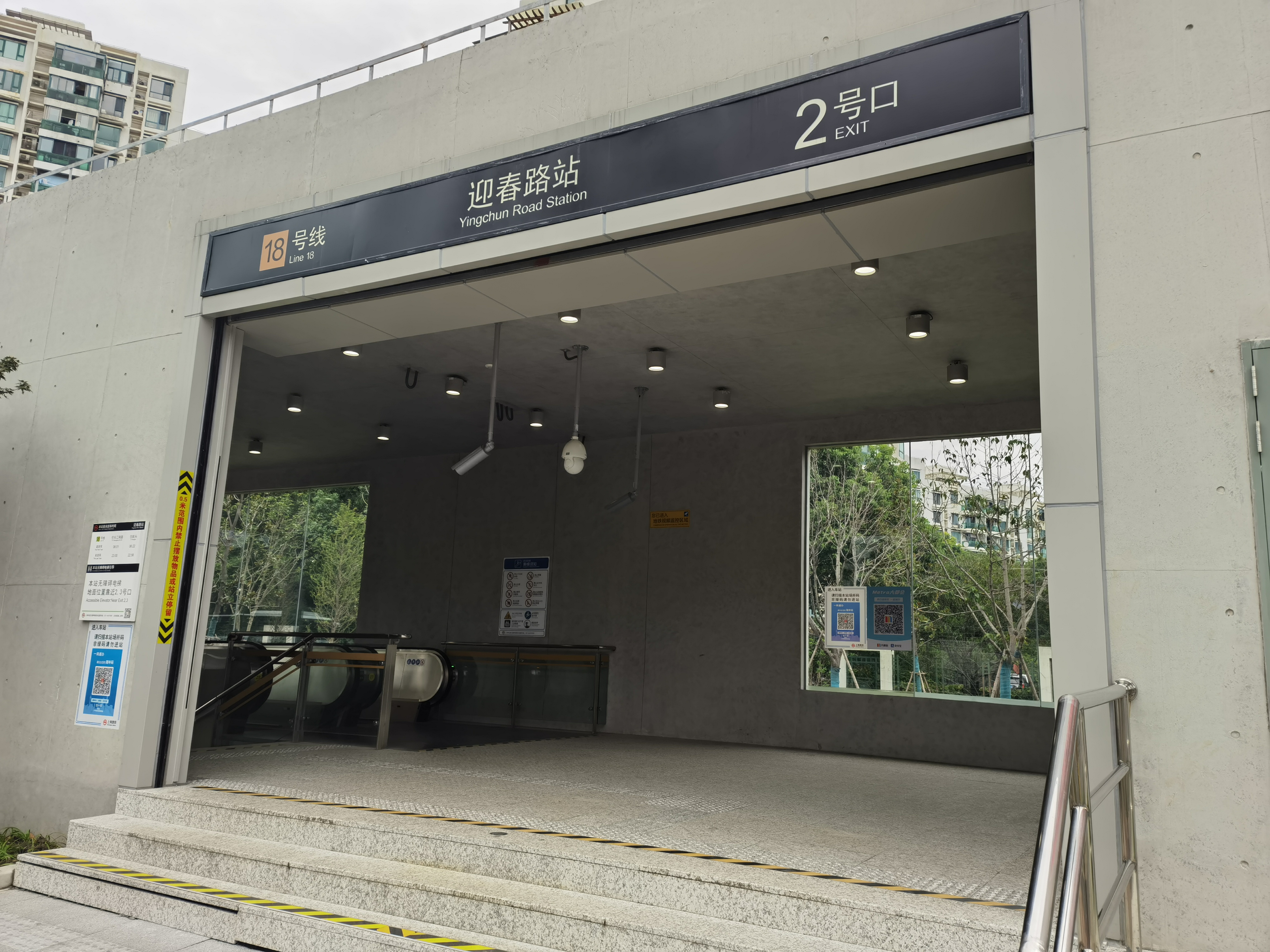
- Entrance 2

General information
- Location: Jinxiu Road and Minsheng Road, Pudong, Shanghai; China
- Coordinates: 31.222521°N 121.546958°E
- Line: Line 18
- Platforms: 2 (1 island platform)
- Tracks: 2

Construction
- Structure type: Underground
- Accessible: Yes

History
- Opened: 30 December 2021

Services
Preceding station	Shanghai Metro	Following station
Middle Yanggao Road towards Kangwen Road	Line 18	Longyang Road towards Hangtou
Location

Yingchun Road (Chinese: 迎春路) is a station that serves Line 18 of the Shanghai Metro. Located at the intersection of Jinxiu Road and Minsheng Road in Pudong, Shanghai, the station was opened with the rest of phase one of Line 18 on December 30, 2021. The station is named after the nearby Yingchun Road, which intersects Minsheng Road one block north of the station.
