= Kangqiao station =

Shanghai Metro station

Kangqiao 康桥
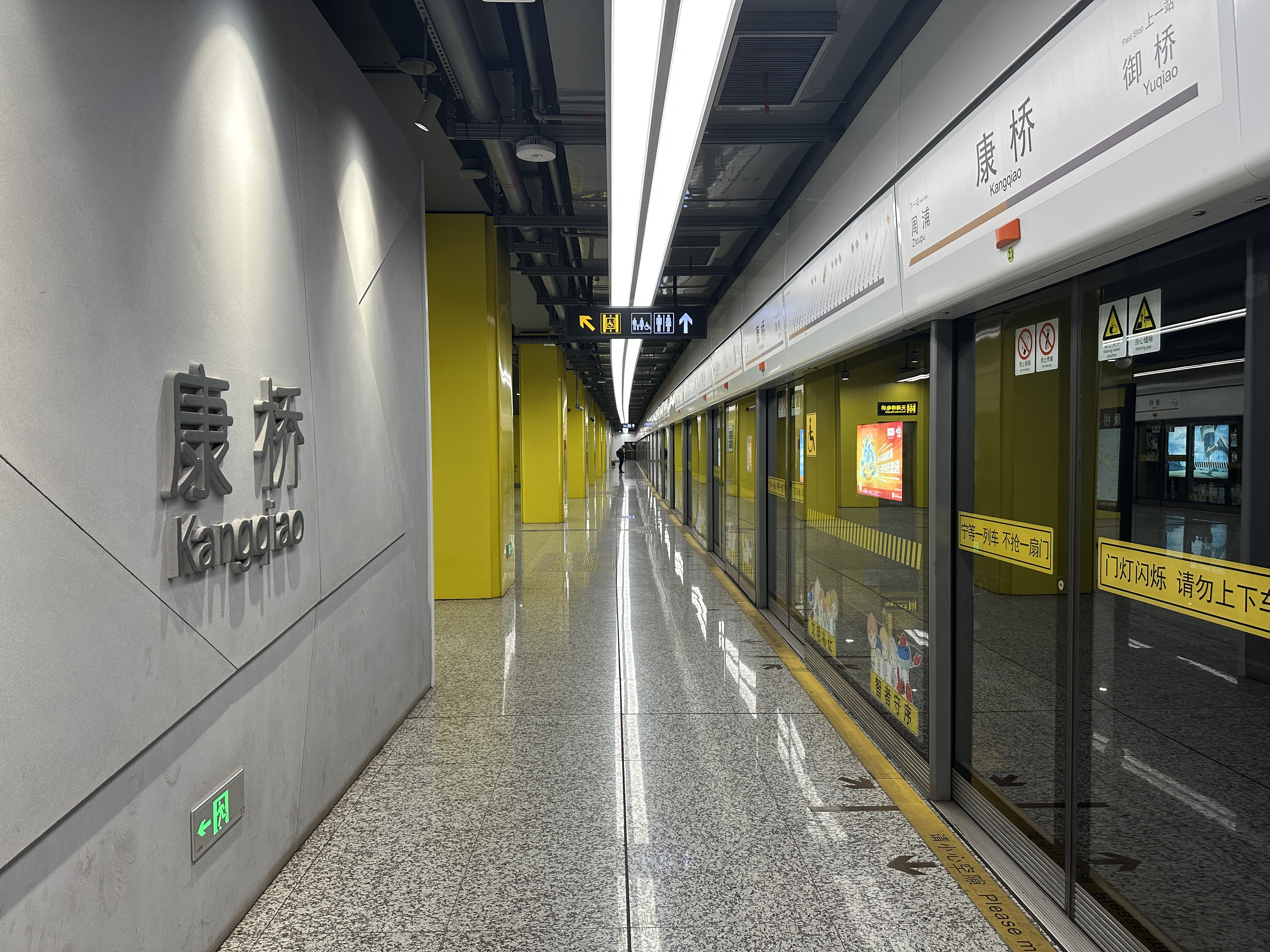

General information
- Location: Xiuyan Road and Hunan Highway; Pudong, Shanghai; China
- Coordinates: 31.136590°N 121.563031°E
- Line: Line 18
- Platforms: 2 (1 island platform)
- Tracks: 2

Construction
- Structure type: Underground
- Accessible: Yes

History
- Opened: 26 December 2020
- Previous names: Hunan Highway

Services
Preceding station	Shanghai Metro	Following station
Yuqiao towards Kangwen Road	Line 18	Zhoupu towards Hangtou
Location

Kangqiao (simplified Chinese: 康桥; traditional Chinese: 康橋; pinyin: Kāngqiáo), formerly known as Hunan Highway (simplified Chinese: 沪南公路; traditional Chinese: 滬南公路; pinyin: Hùnán Gōnglù), is a Shanghai Metro station located on Line 18 in Pudong, Shanghai. Located at the intersection of Xiuyan Road and Hunan Highway, the station opened for passenger services on 26 December 2020. It is part of the first section of Line 18 to become operational, a southern segment of phase one of the line which consists of eight stations between Yuqiao and Hangtou stations.
