= Shanghai University of Finance and Economics station =

Metro station in Shanghai, China

Shanghai University of Finance and Economics 上海财经大学

General information
- Location: Zhengli Road and Wuchuan Road, Yangpu District, Shanghai; China
- Coordinates: 31.309971°N 121.491872°E
- Line: Line 18
- Platforms: 2 (1 island platform)
- Tracks: 2

Construction
- Structure type: Underground
- Accessible: Yes

History
- Opened: 30 December 2021
- Previous names: Zhengli Road (政立路); Wuchuan Road (武川路)

Services
Preceding station	Shanghai Metro	Following station
Yingao Road towards Kangwen Road	Line 18	Fudan University towards Hangtou
Location

Shanghai University of Finance and Economics (simplified Chinese: 上海财经大学; traditional Chinese: 上海財經大學; pinyin: Shànghǎi Cáijīng Dàxué), formerly named Zhengli Road (Chinese: 政立路; pinyin: Zhènglì Lù), is a metro station as part of Line 18 of the Shanghai Metro. Located at the intersection of Zhengli Road and Wuchuan Road in Yangpu District, Shanghai, the station opened with the rest of phase one of Line 18 on December 30, 2021. It is located near the main campus of the Shanghai University of Finance and Economics. During the planning stage of Line 18, the station was also known as Wuchuan Road (Chinese: 武川路).

It will also be a station on the proposed Shanghai Metro Line 20, as outlined in the five-year Shanghai urban rail transit plan by the National Development and Reform Commission in 2018.
