= Middle Yanggao Road station =

Metro station in Shanghai, China

Middle Yanggao Road 杨高中路
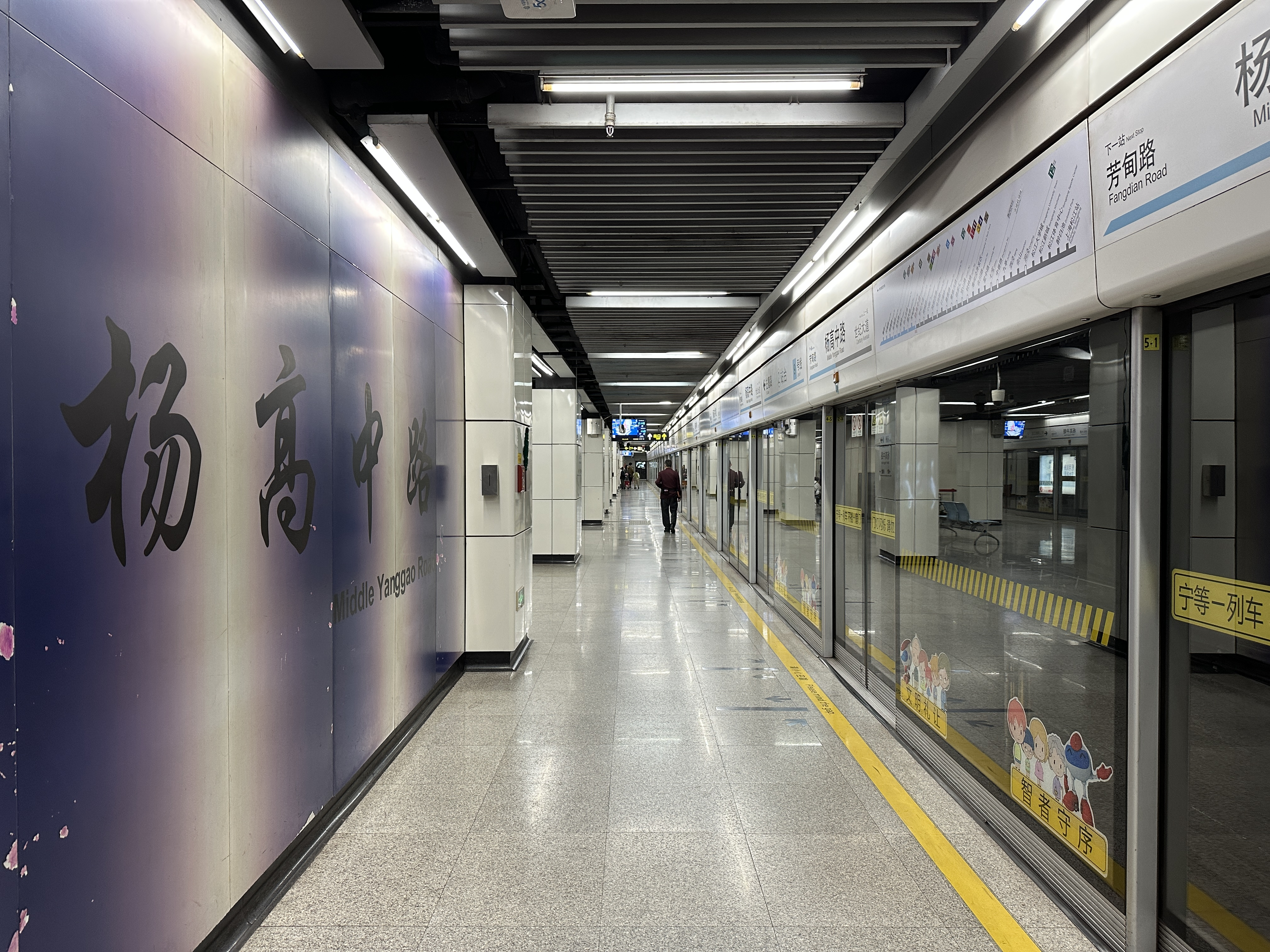
- Platform of Line 9

General information
- Location: Middle Yanggao Road and Minsheng Road; Pudong New Area, Shanghai; China
- Coordinates: 31°13′47″N 121°32′40″E
- Operator: Shanghai No. 1 Metro Operation Co. Ltd.
- Lines: Line 9; Line 18
- Platforms: 4 (2 island platforms)
- Tracks: 4

Construction
- Structure type: Underground
- Accessible: Yes

History
- Opened: 7 April 2010 (Line 9); 30 December 2021 (Line 18)

Services
Preceding station	Shanghai Metro	Following station
Century Avenue towards Shanghai Songjiang Railway Station	Line 9	Fangdian Road towards Caolu
Minsheng Road towards Kangwen Road	Line 18	Yingchun Road towards Hangtou
Location
- Location within Shanghai

Middle Yanggao Road (simplified Chinese: 杨高中路; traditional Chinese: 楊高中路; pinyin: Yánggāo Zhōnglù) is a station on Line 9 of the Shanghai Metro. It is located at the intersection of Middle Yanggao Road and Minsheng Road in the city's Pudong New Area. It served as the eastern terminus of the line from its opening on 7 April 2010, until 30 December 2017, when an eastern extension of Line 9 opened, extending the line further east to Caolu.

The station was conceived as part of phase two of Line 9. However, due to construction delays, it opened on 7 April 2010, three months later than the other stations on the same easterly extension. On 30 December 2021 the station became an interchange after the opening of Line 18.

== Station layout ==
1F	Ground level	Exits
B1	Line 9 concourse	Tickets, Service Center, Convenient stores
B1	Line 18 concourse	Tickets, Service Center, Convenient stores
B2	Platform 1	← Line 9 towards Shanghai Songjiang Railway Station (Century Avenue)
B2	Island platform, doors open on the left
B2	Platform 2	Line 9 towards Caolu (Fangdian Road) →
B3	Platform 4	← Line 18 towards Kangwen Road (Minsheng Road)
B3	Island platform, doors open on the left
B3	Platform 3	Line 18 towards Hangtou (Yingchun Road) →

== Entrances/exits ==
- 1: Yanggao Road (M), Minsheng Road
- 3: Minsheng Road, Yanggao Road (M)
- 4: Yanggao Road (M), Minsheng Road
- 5: Minsheng Road, Yanggao Road (M)
- 6: Minsheng Road, Dingxiang Road
- 7: Minsheng Road, Dingxiang Road
- 8: Minsheng Road
