= Beizhong Road station =

Metro station in Shanghai, China

Beizhong Road 北中路
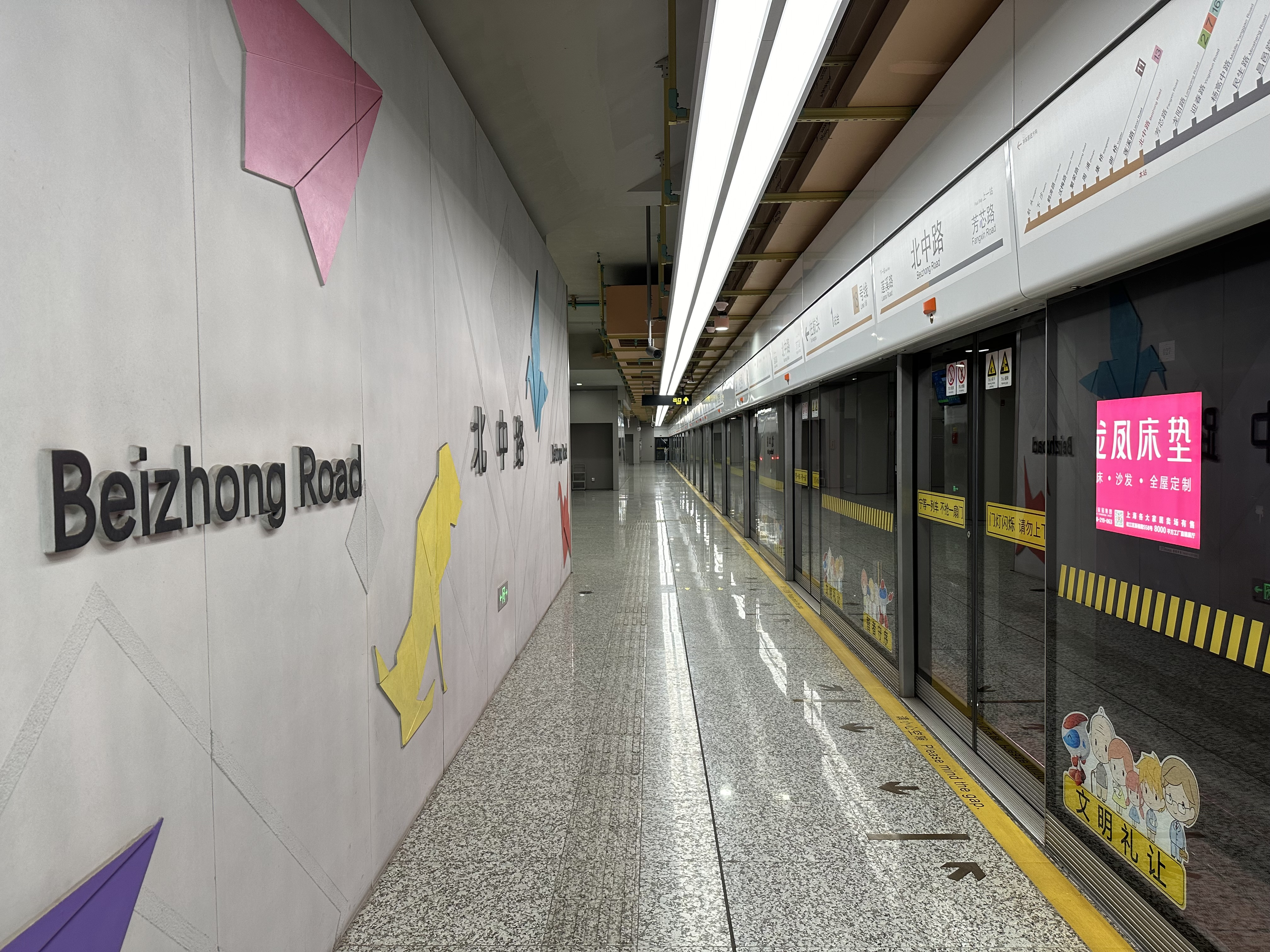
- Station platform

General information
- Location: Beizhong Road and Lianxi Road, Pudong, Shanghai; China
- Coordinates: 31.185276°N 121.557001°E
- Line: Line 18
- Platforms: 2 (1 island platform)
- Tracks: 2

Construction
- Structure type: Underground
- Accessible: Yes

History
- Opened: 30 December 2021

Services
Preceding station	Shanghai Metro	Following station
Fangxin Road towards Kangwen Road	Line 18	Lianxi Road towards Hangtou
Location

Beizhong Road (Chinese: 北中路) is a station on Line 18 of the Shanghai Metro. Located at the intersection of Beizhong Road and Lianxi Road in Pudong, Shanghai, the station opened with the rest of phase one of Line 18 in 2021.
