= Xiasha station (Shanghai Metro) =

Shanghai Metro station

Xiasha 下沙
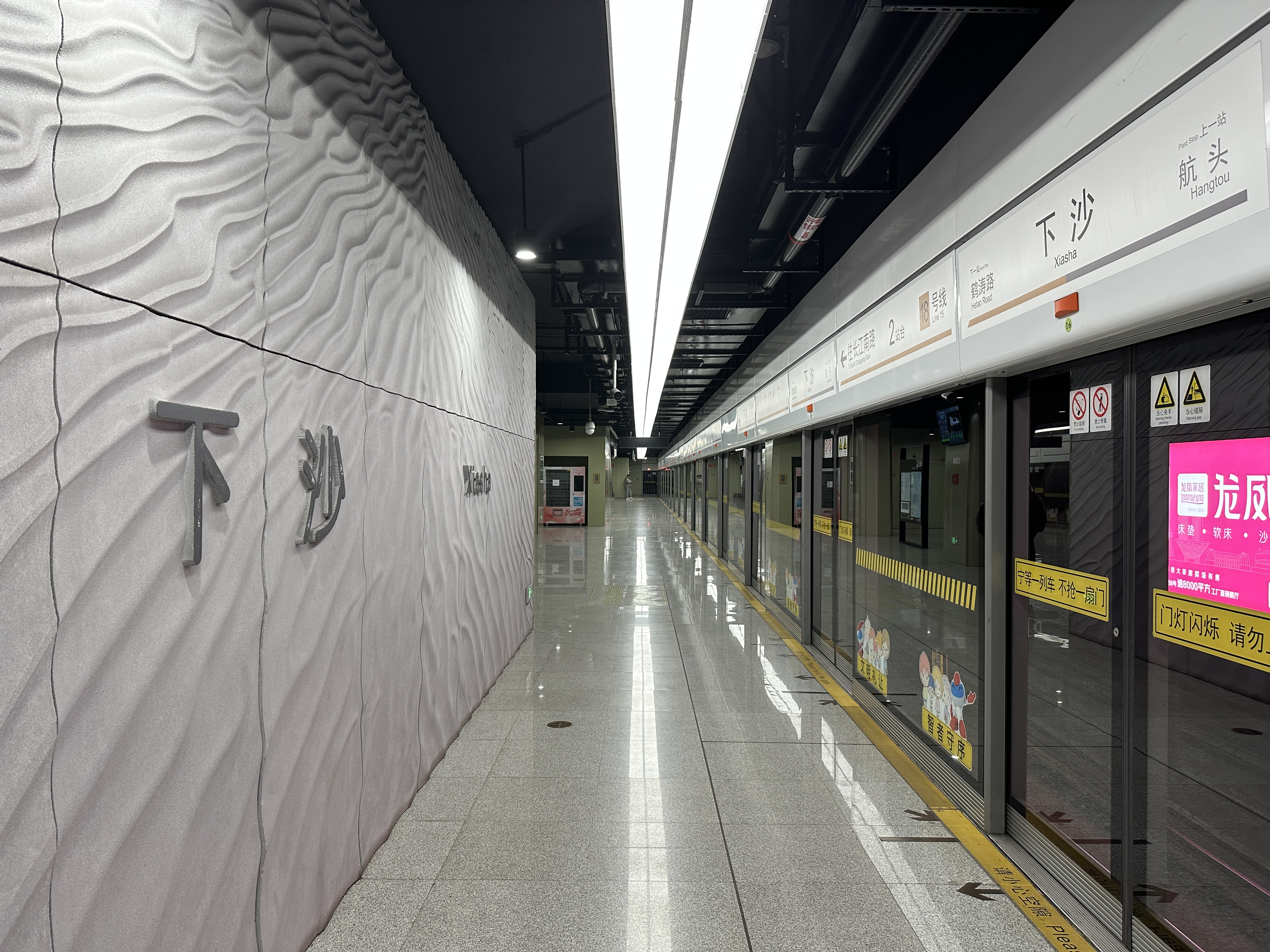

General information
- Location: West Heli Road and Hunan Highway; Pudong, Shanghai; China
- Coordinates: 31.056899°N 121.584772°E
- Line: Line 18
- Platforms: 2 (1 island platform)
- Tracks: 2

Construction
- Structure type: Underground
- Accessible: Yes

History
- Opened: 26 December 2020
- Previous names: West Heli Road

Services
Preceding station	Shanghai Metro	Following station
Hetao Road towards Kangwen Road	Line 18	Hangtou Terminus
Location

Xiasha (Chinese: 下沙; pinyin: Xiàshā), formerly known as West Heli Road (simplified Chinese: 鹤立西路; traditional Chinese: 鶴立西路; pinyin: Hèlì Xīlù), is a Shanghai Metro station located on Line 18 in Pudong, Shanghai. Located at the intersection of West Heli Road and Hunan Highway, the station opened on 26 December 2020. It is part of the first section of Line 18 to become operational, a southern segment of phase one of the line which consists of eight stations between Yuqiao and Hangtou.
