= Lianxi Road station =

Metro station in Shanghai, China

Lianxi Road 莲溪路
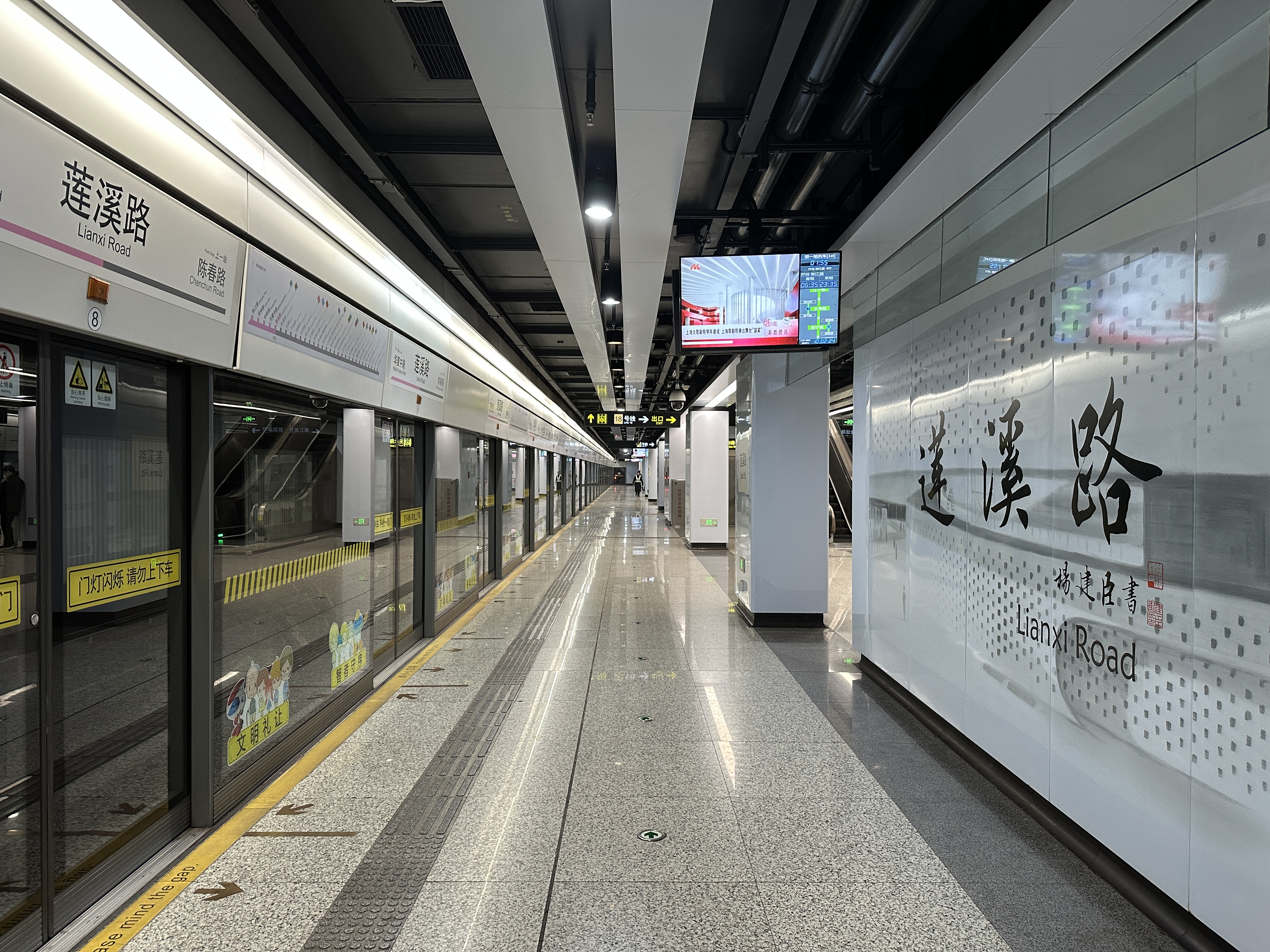
- Platform of Line 13

General information
- Location: Lianxi Road and Lüke Road, Pudong, Shanghai; China
- Coordinates: 31.1713°N 121.562°E
- Operated by: Shanghai No. 2 Metro Operation Co. Ltd. (Line 13)
- Lines: Line 13; Line 18
- Platforms: 4 (2 island platforms)
- Tracks: 4

Construction
- Structure type: Underground
- Accessible: Yes

History
- Opened: 30 December 2018 (Line 13); 30 December 2021 (Line 18)

Services
Preceding station	Shanghai Metro	Following station
Chenchun Road towards Jinyun Road	Line 13	Middle Huaxia Road towards Zhangjiang Road
Beizhong Road towards Kangwen Road	Line 18	Yuqiao towards Hangtou
Location

Lianxi Road (simplified Chinese: 莲溪路; traditional Chinese: 蓮溪路; pinyin: Liánxī Lù) is an interchange station on Line 13 and Line 18 of the Shanghai Metro. Located at Lianxi Road and Lüke Road in Pudong, Shanghai, the station opened on 30 December 2018 with the opening of the phases 2 and 3 extensions of Line 13. It became an interchange station with the opening of the remainder of phase one of Line 18 on 30 December 2021. Although this segment of Line 18 was originally scheduled to open by the end of 2020, the opening date has been delayed to late 2021.

== Station layout ==
G	Entrances and Exits	Exits 1-7
B1	Concourse	Faregates, Station Agent
B2	Westbound	← Line 13 towards Jinyun Road (Chenchun Road)
B2	Island platform, doors open on the left
B2	Eastbound	Line 13 towards Zhangjiang Road (Middle Huaxia Road) →
B3	Northbound	← Line 18 towards South Changjiang Road (Beizhong Road)
B3	Island platform, doors open on the left
B3	Southbound	Line 18 towards Hangtou (Yuqiao) →

== Gallery ==
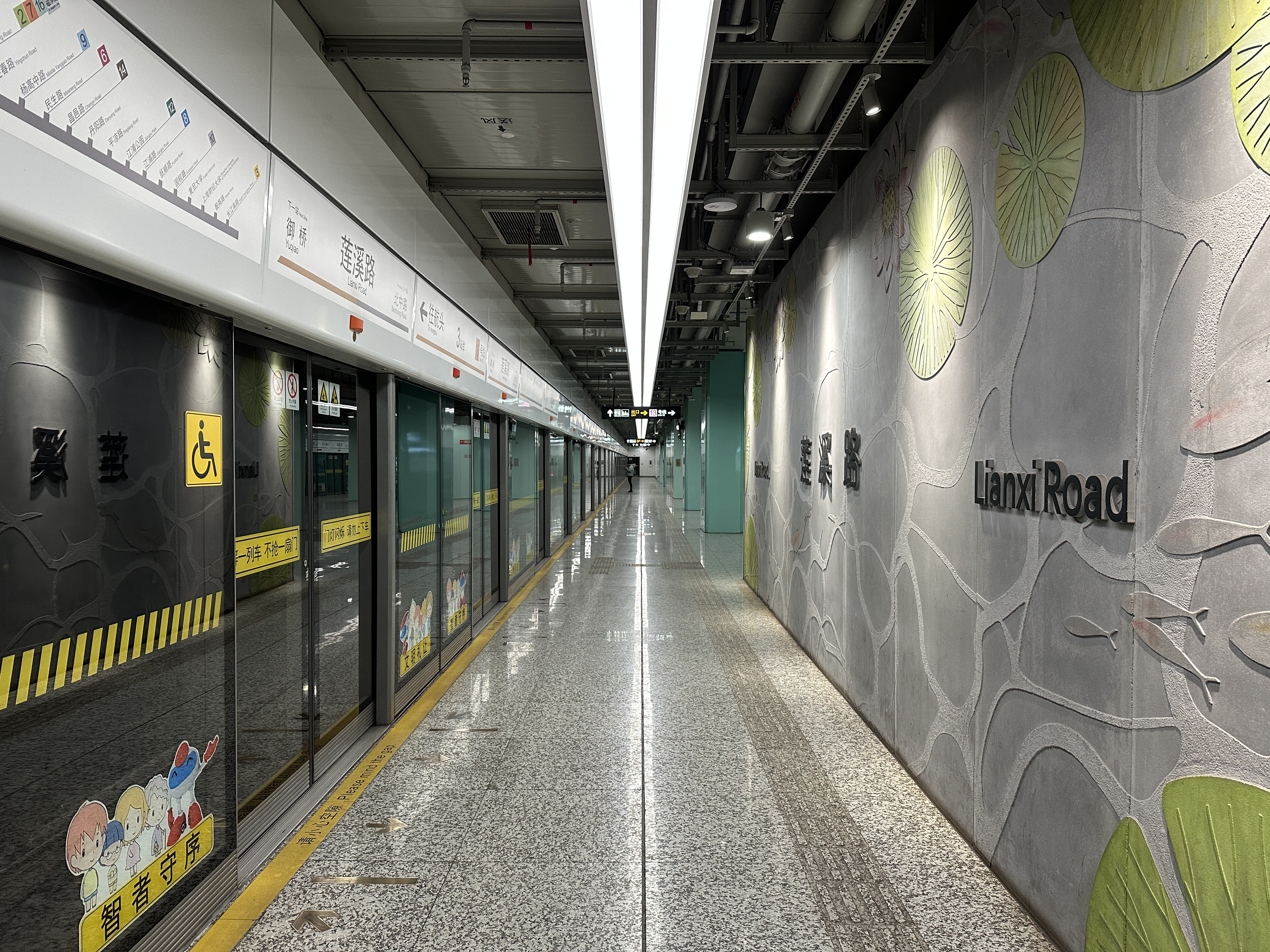
Line 18 platforms

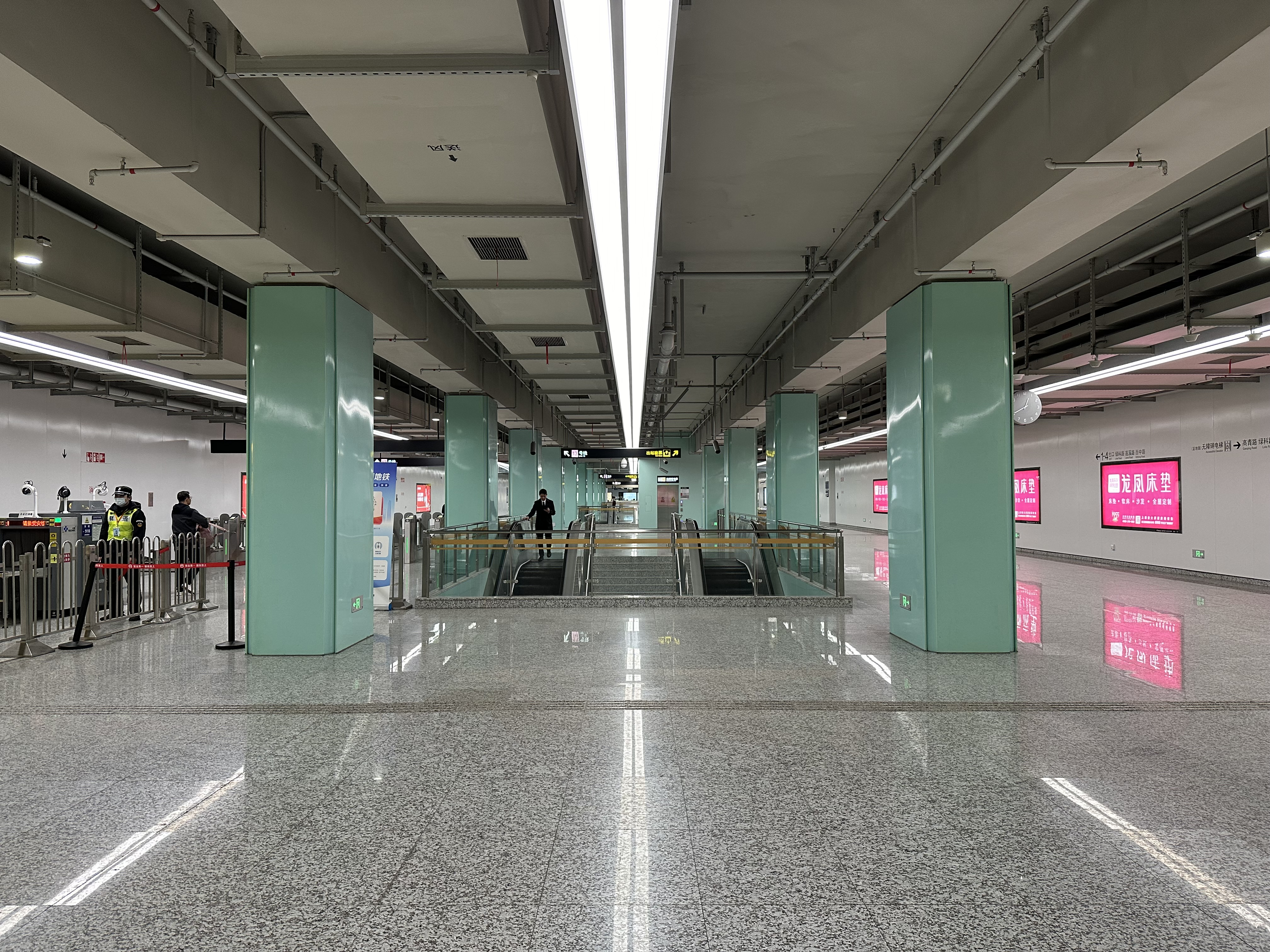
Line 18 concourse

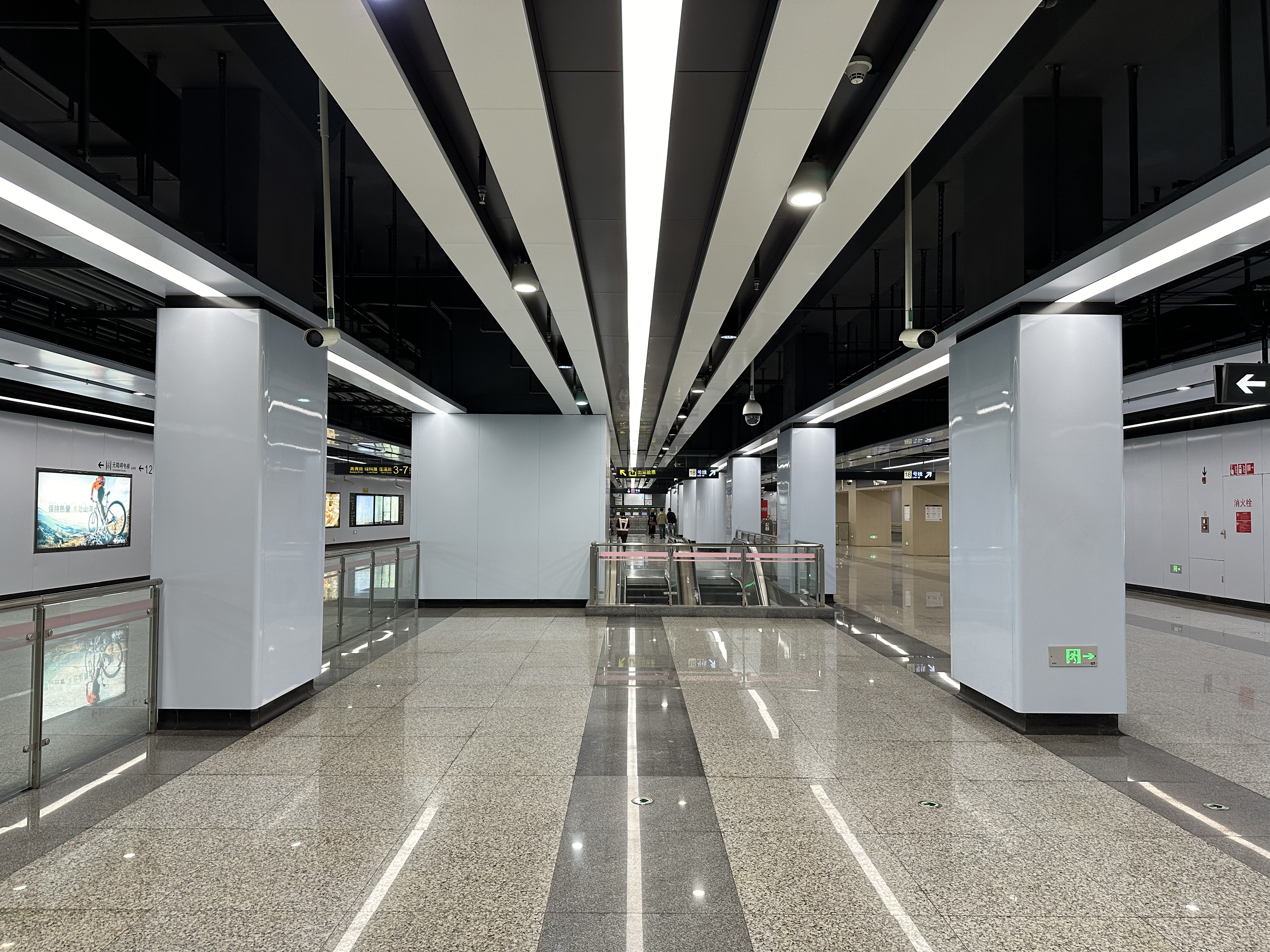
Line 13 concourse
