= Line 18 (Shanghai Metro) =

Metro line in Shanghai

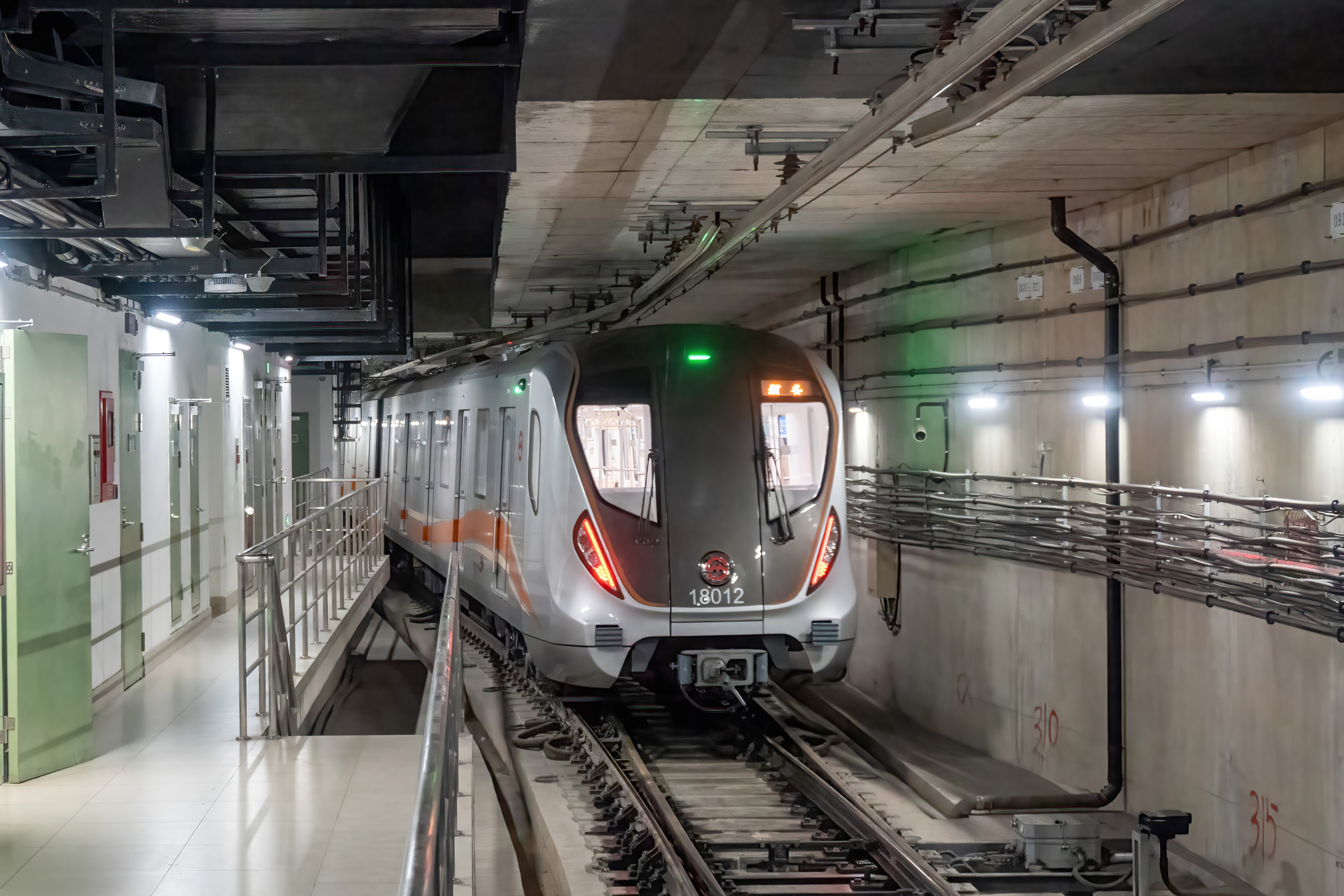
- An 18A01 train at Hangtou station

Overview
- Other name: L5 (planned name)
- Native name: 上海地铁18号线
- Status: Operational
- Owner: Shanghai Rail Transit Line 18 Development Co., Ltd.
- Locale: Baoshan, Yangpu and Pudong districts, Shanghai, China
- Termini: Kangwen Road; Hangtou
- Stations: 31
- Website: www.shmetro.com

Service
- Type: Rapid transit
- System: Shanghai Metro
- Services: Mainline: Kangwen Road ↔ Hangtou; Partial mainline: South Changjiang Road ↔ Shenmei Road
- Operator: Shanghai Maglev Transportation Development Co.,
- Depot: Hangtou Depot
- Rolling stock: 18A01; 18A02

History
- Work began: May 12, 2016; 10 years ago
- Opened: December 26, 2020; 5 years ago
- Last extension: December 27, 2025; 9 months ago

Technical
- Line length: 44.815 km (27.847 mi)
- Character: Underground
- Track gauge: 1,435 mm (4 ft 8 1/2 in)
- Electrification: Overhead lines 1.5kV DC
- Operating speed: 80 km (50 mi); Average speed: 38.4 km (24 mi)
- Signalling: GoA4 / UTO; Alstom Urbalis 888 CBTC
Route map
To scale geographic map:
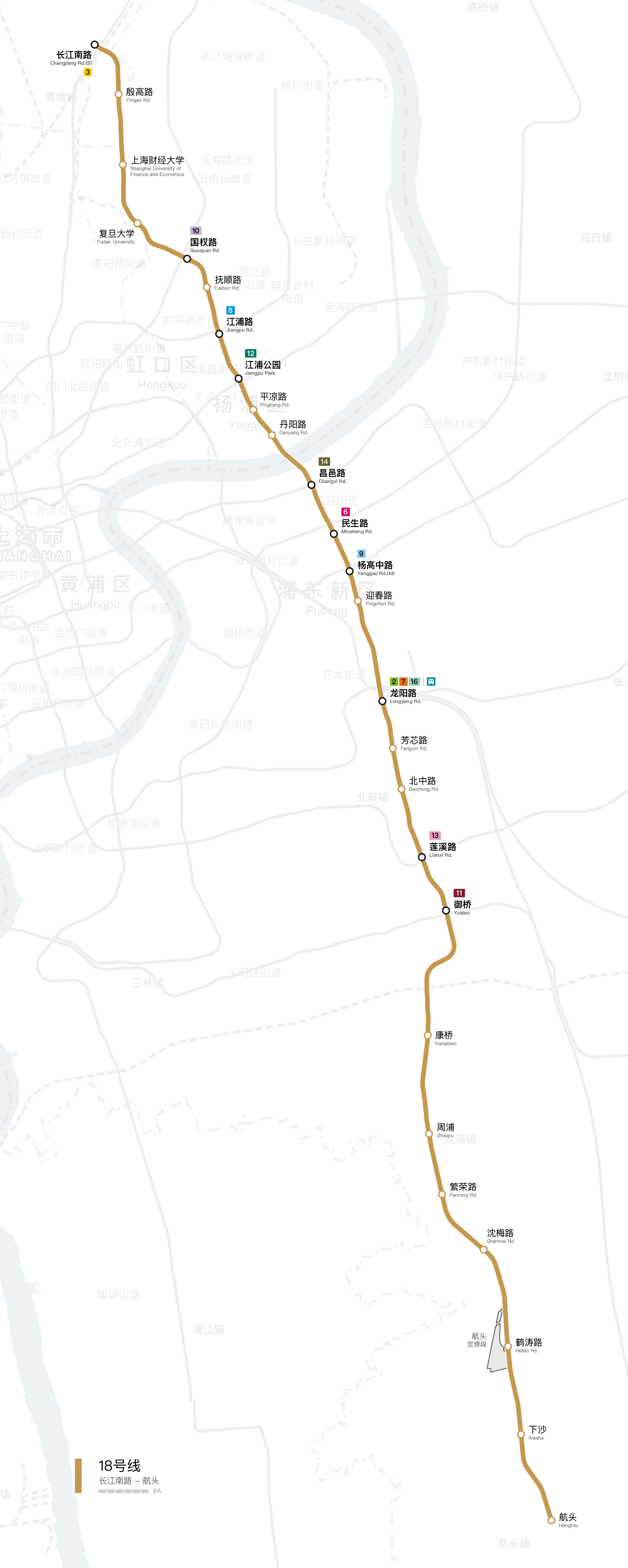

Line 18 is a north–south Shanghai Metro line running from South Changjiang Road station in the city's Baoshan District to Hangtou station in Pudong, with a length of 36.13 km (22.45 mi). The line was originally scheduled to open by the end of 2020. However, officials announced that only the initial segment of eight stations in Pudong started test runs in September 2020. The 14.5 km (9.0 mi) southern section opened for passenger operations on December 26, 2020. The remainder of the line was opened on 30 December 2021. The line is 44.8 km (27.8 mi) long with 31 stations. The line is one of Shanghai Metro's new batch of high capacity fully automated and driverless lines along with Lines 14 and 15. The line is colored tan on system maps.

== History ==
The line began construction on 12 May 2016. An eight-station segment in Pudong, running from Yuqiao station in the north to Hangtou station in the south, underwent testing in September 2020 and opened on 26 December 2020. This initial segment connects to line 11 at Yuqiao station. The remaining section of the first phase opened a year later connecting it north to South Changjiang Road on line 3.

Shanghai metro line 18 opening history
Segment	Commenced	Opened	Length	Station(s)	Name	Investment
Hangtou - Yuqiao	12 May 2016	26 Dec 2020	15.05 km (9.4 mi)	8	Phase 1 (initial section)
Yuqiao - South Changjiang Road	12 May 2016	30 Dec 2021	21.45 km (13.3 mi)	18	Phase 1 (northern section)
South Changjiang Road - Kangwen Road	28 Jun 2021	27 December 2025	8.1 km (5.0 mi)	5	Phase 2
South Jiangyang Road	28 Jun 2021	exp December 2027	Infill station	1	Phase 2

=== Phase 2 ===
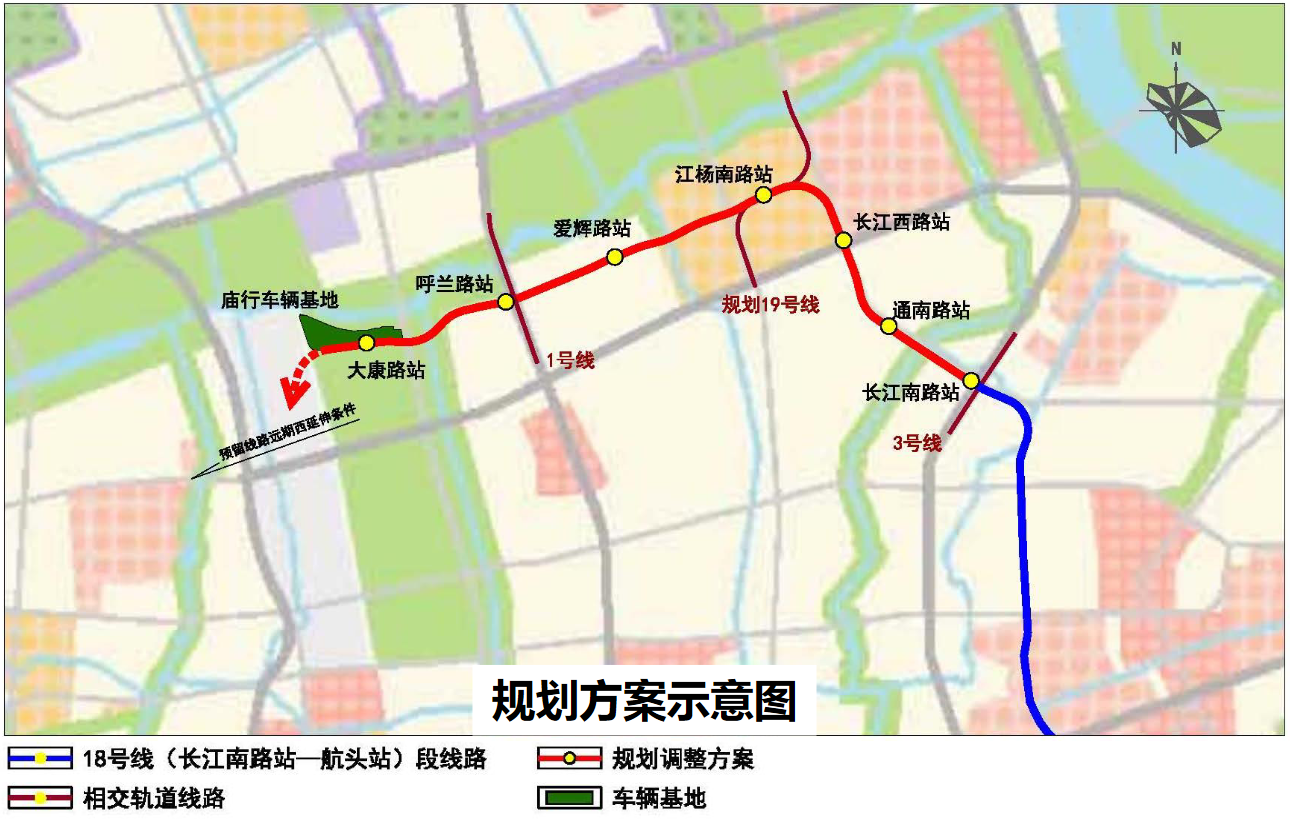
Shanghai metro line 18 Phase II

The second phase of line 18 underwent a planning change, adding a station at West Changjiang Road, going into a large heavy industrial zone, intersecting Line 1 at Hulan Road station instead of Tonghe Xincun station and ending at Kangwen Road station instead of Kangning Road station. The second phase has six stations and is 8.1 km (5.0 mi) long. The extension opened on 27 December 2025 except for South Jiangyang Road station, which will open in tandem with Line 19. Proposals to extend the line further west to Line 7 are under consideration.

=== Controversy ===
During the planning of Line 18, large amounts of controversy was generated among local residents when the initial alignment of the southern section of Line 18 was shifted from Kangshen Road westwards 1 km (0.62 mi) to follow the S122 Hunan Highway instead. The new alignment, instead of directly serving the densely populated Kangshen Road axis of Zhoupu town, now merely serves the western edge of Zhoupu. Planners received uncharacteristically large volume of feedback on the decision, with 300 calls and 3000 e-mails received pertaining to the change in alignment. Industry insiders have noted that the change in alignment was a compromise between local and regional transport demands. In addition, they noted the increased difficulty and cost of constructing a subway under the narrow Kangshen Road and that there is more land open to new development along the wider Hunan Highway.

== Stations ==
=== Service routes ===
Shanghai Metro Line 18 service routes
M - Mainline: Kangwen Road ↔ Hangtou; P - Partial mainline: South Changjiang Road ↔ Shenmei Road
Routes		Station name		Connections	Distance			Location	Open- ing	Plat- form
M	P	English	Chinese	Connections	km		min	Location	Open- ing	Plat- form
●		Kangwen Road	康文路		0.0	0.0	0	Baoshan	27 December 2025	Underground; Island
●		Hulan Road	呼兰路	1	1.57	1.57		Baoshan	27 December 2025	Underground; Island
●		Aihui Road	爱辉路		1.36	2.93		Baoshan	27 December 2025	Underground; Island
｜		South Jiangyang Road	江杨南路	19	1.77	4.70		Baoshan	December 2027	Underground; Island
●		West Changjiang Road	长江西路		1.25	5.95		Baoshan	27 December 2025	Underground; Island
●		Tongnan Road	通南路		0.96	6.91		Baoshan	27 December 2025	Underground; Island
●	●	South Changjiang Road	长江南路	3	1.19	8.10	0	Baoshan	30 Dec 2021	Underground; Island
●	●	Yingao Road	殷高路		1.40	9.50	2	Baoshan	30 Dec 2021	Underground; Island
●	●	Shanghai University of Finance and Economics	上海财经大学		1.41	10.91	4	Yangpu	30 Dec 2021	Underground; Island
●	●	Fudan University	复旦大学		1.48	12.39	7	Yangpu	30 Dec 2021	Underground; Island
●	●	Guoquan Road	国权路	10	1.06	13.45	9	Yangpu	30 Dec 2021	Underground; Island
●	●	Fushun Road	抚顺路		0.92	14.37	11	Yangpu	30 Dec 2021	Underground; Island
●	●	Jiangpu Road	江浦路	8	1.04	15.41	13	Yangpu	30 Dec 2021	Underground; Island
●	●	Jiangpu Park	江浦公园	12	1.27	16.68	15	Yangpu	30 Dec 2021	Underground; Island
●	●	Pingliang Road	平凉路		0.76	17.44	17	Yangpu	30 Dec 2021	Underground one Island & one Side
●	●	Danyang Road	丹阳路		0.75	18.19	19	Yangpu	30 Dec 2021	Underground; Island
●	●	Changyi Road	昌邑路	14	1.31	19.50	21	Pudong	30 Dec 2021	Underground; Island
●	●	Minsheng Road	民生路	6	0.98	20.48	23	Pudong	30 Dec 2021	Underground; Island
●	●	Middle Yanggao Road	杨高中路	9	1.02	21.50	25	Pudong	30 Dec 2021	Underground; Island
●	●	Yingchun Road	迎春路		0.86	22.36	27	Pudong	30 Dec 2021	Underground; Island
●	●	Longyang Road	龙阳路	2 7 16 Maglev (Note: Out of system transfer with Shanghai Maglev Train.)	2.03	24.39	30	Pudong	30 Dec 2021	Underground; Island
●	●	Fangxin Road	芳芯路		1.20	25.59	32	Pudong	30 Dec 2021	Underground; Island
●	●	Beizhong Road	北中路		0.91	26.50	33	Pudong	30 Dec 2021	Underground; Island
●	●	Lianxi Road	莲溪路	13	1.72	28.22	36	Pudong	30 Dec 2021	Underground; Island
●	●	Yuqiao	御桥	11	1.33	29.55	38	Pudong	26 Dec 2020	Underground; Side
●	●	Kangqiao	康桥		3.08	32.63	42	Pudong	26 Dec 2020	Underground; Island
●	●	Zhoupu	周浦		2.32	34.95	45	Pudong	26 Dec 2020	Underground; Island
●	●	Fanrong Road	繁荣路		1.32	36.27	47	Pudong	26 Dec 2020	Underground; Island
●	●	Shenmei Road	沈梅路		1.53	37.80	49	Pudong	26 Dec 2020	Underground; Island
●		Hetao Road	鹤涛路		2.46	40.26	52	Pudong	26 Dec 2020	Underground; Island
●		Xiasha	下沙		1.76	42.02	55	Pudong	26 Dec 2020	Underground; Island
●		Hangtou	航头		2.58	44.60	57	Pudong	26 Dec 2020	Underground; Island

== Headways ==
Shanghai Metro Line 18 headway
Time		Hangtou - Hetao Road	Shenmei Road - South Changjiang Road
Monday - Friday (Working Days)
AM peak	7:30–9:00	About 6 min	About 3 min
Off-peak	9:00–17:00	About 7 min
PM peak	17:00–19:10	About 7 min	About 3 min and 30 sec
Other hours	Before 7:30 After 19:10	About 7 min - 10 min
Saturday and Sunday (Weekends)
Peak	7:00–21:00	About 6 min and 30 sec
Other hours	Before 7:00 After 21:00	About 6 min and 30 sec - 12 min

== Technology ==
=== Rolling stock ===
The trains will be the first Shanghai Metro trains to offer wireless and USB phone charging.
