= Chenchun Road station =

Metro station in Shanghai, China

Chenchun Road 陈春路
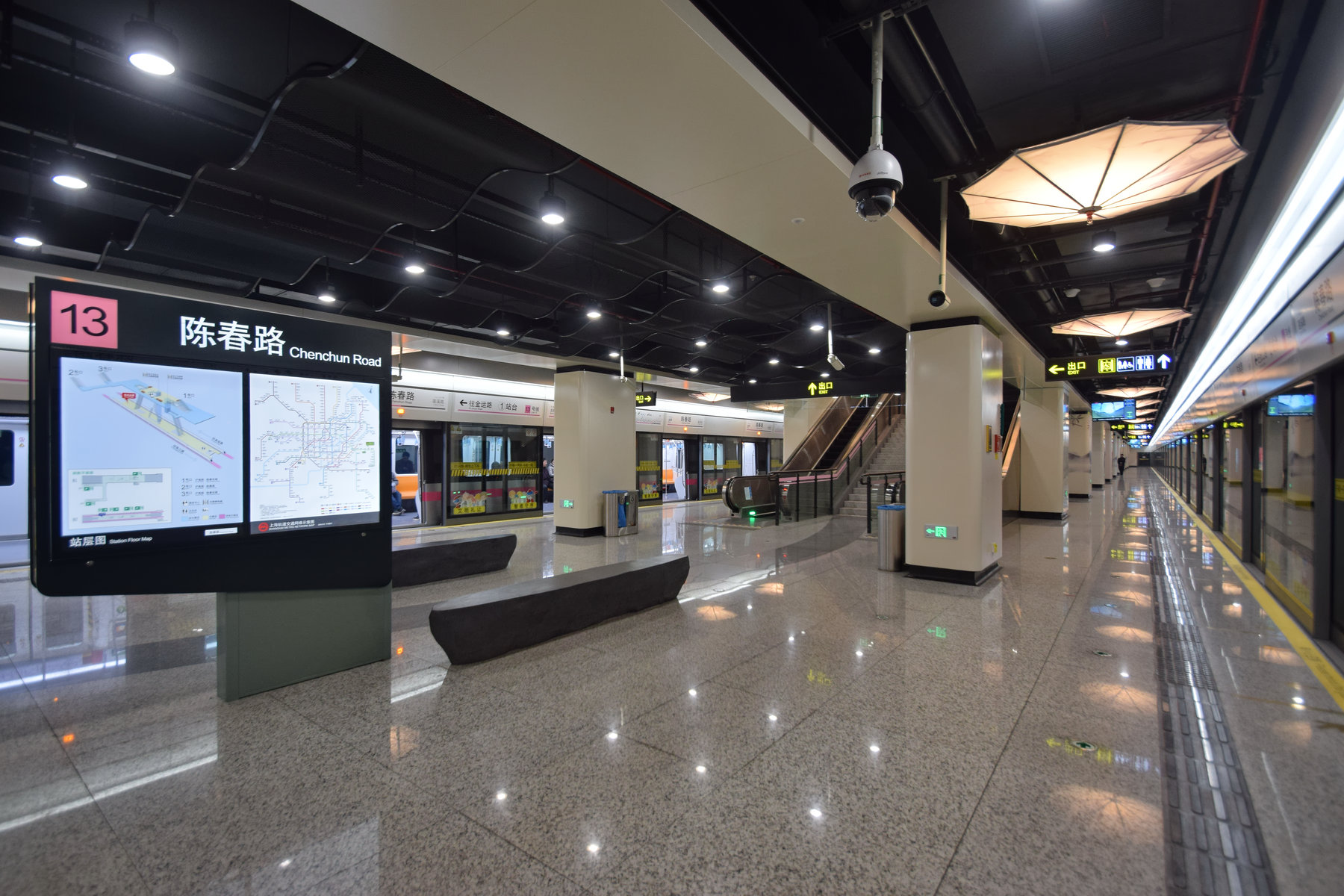
- Station platform

General information
- Location: Hunan Road and Chenchun Road, Pudong, Shanghai; China
- Coordinates: 31.1771°N 121.5539°E
- Operated by: Shanghai No. 2 Metro Operation Co. Ltd.
- Line: Line 13
- Platforms: 2 (1 island platform)
- Tracks: 2

Construction
- Structure type: Underground
- Accessible: Yes

History
- Opened: 30 December 2018

Services
Preceding station	Shanghai Metro	Following station
Beicai towards Jinyun Road	Line 13	Lianxi Road towards Zhangjiang Road
Location

Chenchun Road (simplified Chinese: 陈春路; traditional Chinese: 陳春路; pinyin: Chénchūn Lù) is a station on Line 13 of the Shanghai Metro, part of phase two of the line. Located at Hunan Road and Chenchun Road in Pudong, Shanghai, the station opened with the rest of phases 2 and 3 of Line 13 on 30 December 2018.
