= Yuqiao station =

Shanghai Metro station

Yuqiao 御桥
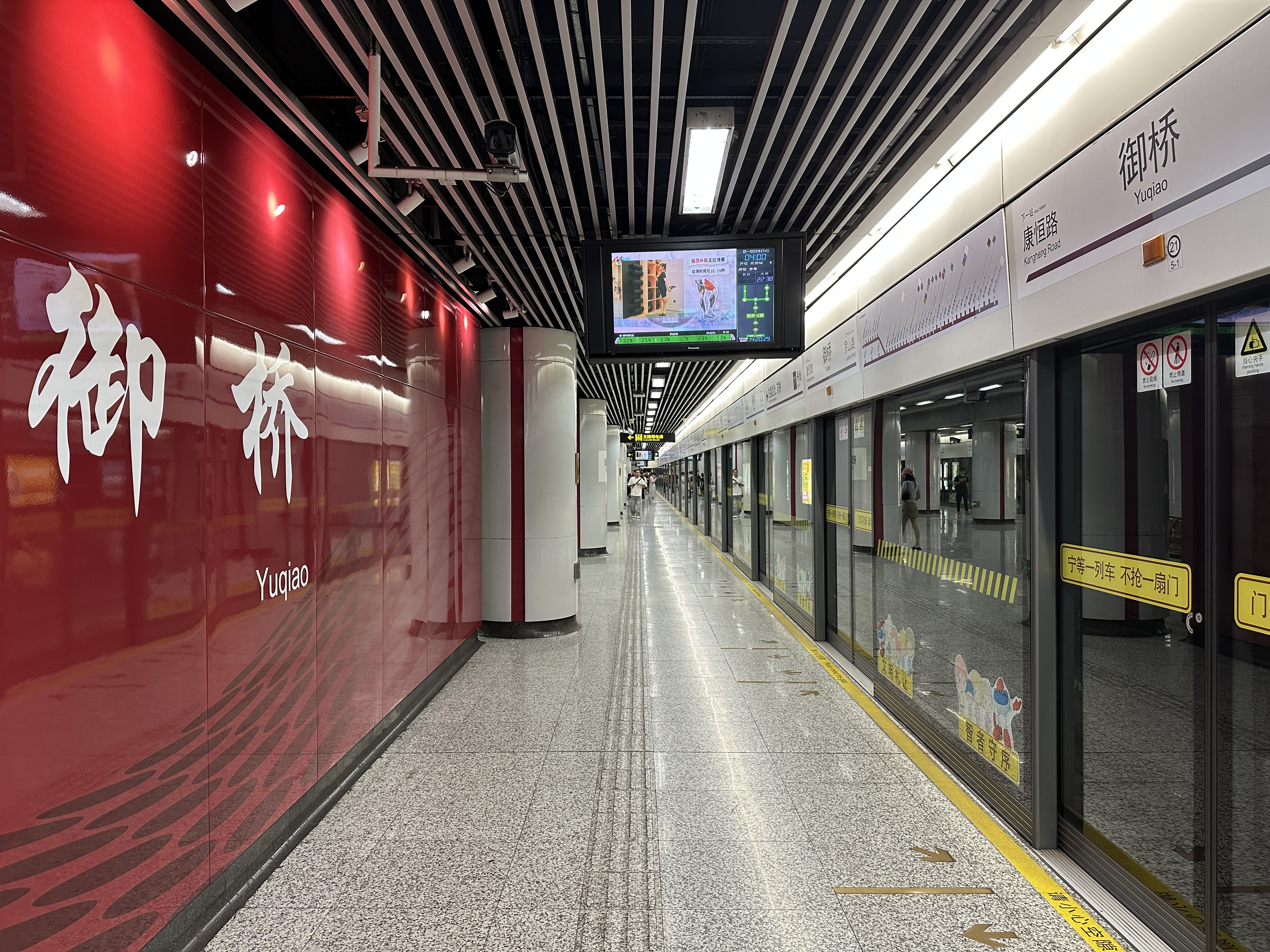
- Line 11 platform

General information
- Location: Yuqiao Road (御桥路) and Yuqing Road (御青路); Beicai, Pudong New Area, Shanghai; China
- Coordinates: 31.160350°N 121.566816°E
- Operator: Shanghai No. 2 Metro Operation Co. Ltd. (Line 11); Shanghai Maglev Development Company (Line 18)
- Lines: Line 11; Line 18
- Platforms: 4 (1 island platform and 2 side platforms)
- Tracks: 4

Construction
- Structure type: Underground
- Accessible: Yes

History
- Opened: 31 August 2013 (Line 11); 26 December 2020 (Line 18)

Services
| Preceding station | Shanghai Metro | Following station |
|---|---|---|
| Kangheng Road towards North Jiading or Huaqiao | Line 11 | Luoshan Road towards Disney Resort |
| Lianxi Road towards Kangwen Road | Line 18 | Kangqiao towards Hangtou |
Location
- Location within Shanghai

Yuqiao (simplified Chinese: 御桥; traditional Chinese: 御橋; pinyin: Yùqiáo) is a Shanghai Metro interchange station in Pudong, Shanghai, located at the intersection of Yuqiao Road and Yuqing Road in Beicai town. It is served by Lines 11 and 18. The station opened as part of Line 11's phase 2 extension on August 31, 2013. It became an interchange station with Line 18 when the southern portion of phase 1 of that line opened on 26 December 2020. It served as the northern terminus of Line 18, which consists of eight stations between Yuqiao and Hangtou, until the line was further extended northward to South Changjiang Road on December 30, 2021.

On Line 11, the next station to the east is Luoshan Road. To the west, the next station is Kangheng Road. On Line 18, the next station to the south is Kangqiao. To the north, the next station is Lianxi Road.

== Station layout ==
| 1F | Ground level | Exits |
| B1 | Concourse | Tickets, Service Center |
| B2 | Platform 1 | ← Line 11 towards North Jiading or Huaqiao (Kangheng Road) |
| B2 | Island platform, doors open on the left |
| B2 | Platform 2 | Line 11 towards Disney Resort (Luoshan Road) → |
| B3 | Platform 4 | ← Line 18 towards Kangwen Road (Lianxi Road) |
| B3 | Side platform, doors open on the left |
| B3 | Platform 3 | Line 18 towards Hangtou (Kangqiao) → |
| B3 | Side platform, doors open on the right |

=== Entrances/exits ===
- 1: Yuqiao Road, Yuqing Road, Yushui Road
- 2: Yuqiao Road, Yuqing Road, Yushui Road
- 3: Yuqing Road, Yuqiao Road
- 7: Yuqiao Road, Yuqing Road
- 8: Yuqing Road, Yuqiao Road
- 9: Yuqing Road, Yuqiao Road
