= Hangtou station =

Shanghai Metro station

Hangtou 航头
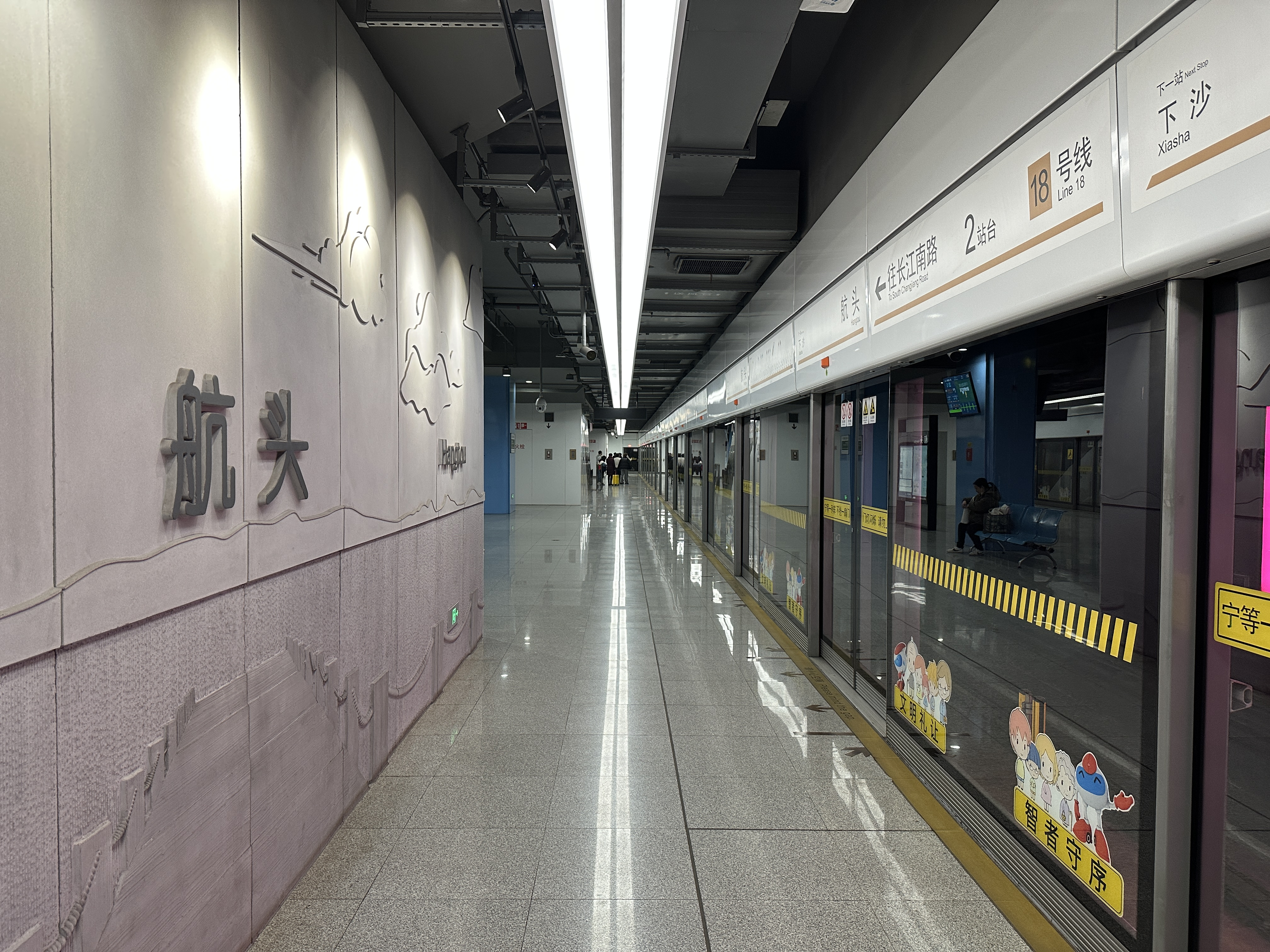

General information
- Location: Hangtou Road and Hunan Highway; Pudong, Shanghai; China
- Coordinates: 31.037052°N 121.592849°E
- Line: Line 18
- Platforms: 2 (1 island platform)
- Tracks: 2

Construction
- Structure type: Underground
- Accessible: Yes

History
- Opened: 26 December 2020

Services
Preceding station	Shanghai Metro	Following station
Xiasha towards Kangwen Road	Line 18	Terminus
Location

Hangtou (simplified Chinese: 航头; traditional Chinese: 航頭; pinyin: Hángtóu) is a Shanghai Metro station located on Line 18 in Hangtou town, Pudong, Shanghai. Located near the intersection of Hangtou Road and Hunan Highway, the station serves as the southern terminus of the line. It is part of the first section of Line 18 to become operational, a southern segment of phase one of the line which consists of eight stations from Hangtou station northward to Yuqiao station, which opened on 26 December 2020.

== History ==
Hangtou station opened on 26 December 2020, as part of an initial southern segment of phase one of Line 18, serving as its southern terminus. This initial segment runs north–south and consists of eight stations between Yuqiao station and Hangtou station, located entirely in the city's Pudong New Area. This segment of Line 18 is connected to the rest of the Shanghai Metro network via an interchange with Line 11 at Yuqiao station. The entire phase one of the line was expected to open by the end of 2020, however, due to construction delays, the remainder of phase one will open by the end of 2021.

== Description ==
The station is located near the intersection of Hunan Highway and Hangtou Road within Hangtou town, in the Pudong New Area of Shanghai. It is an underground station with a single island platform, located beneath a concourse level. Toilets are located at the south end of the platform, within the fare-paid area.

Like all stations on Line 18, Hangtou station is fully accessible. An elevator connects the street level to the concourse level near exit 1. Within the fare-paid zone, an elevator connects the concourse level to the platform level.

=== Exits ===
The station has three exits. Exit 1 is located on the east side of Hunan Highway, close to its intersection with Hangyuan Road. Exits 2 and 3 are located on the west and east side of Hunan Highway respectively, close to its intersection with Hangtou Road.

== Gallery ==
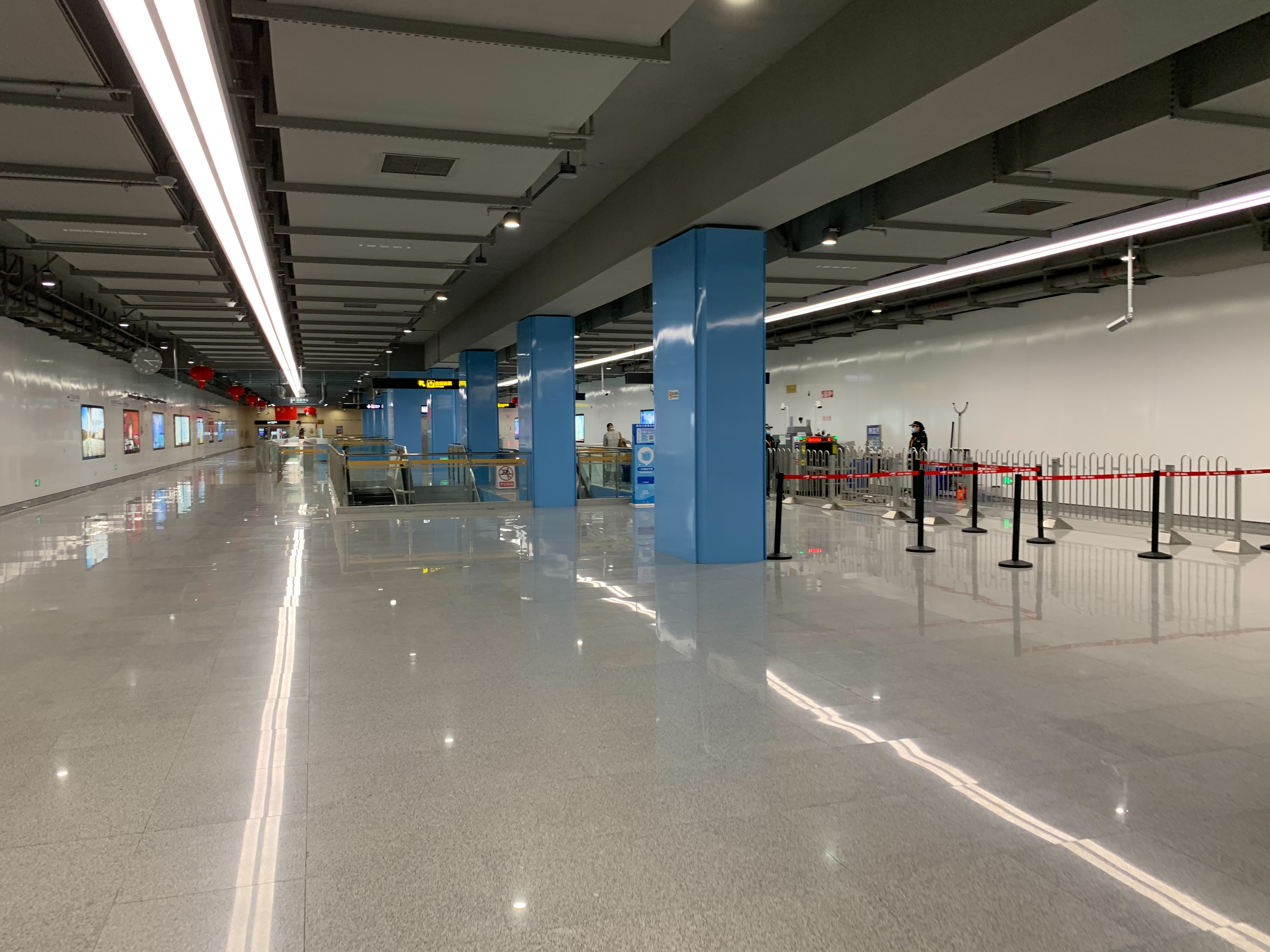
Concourse

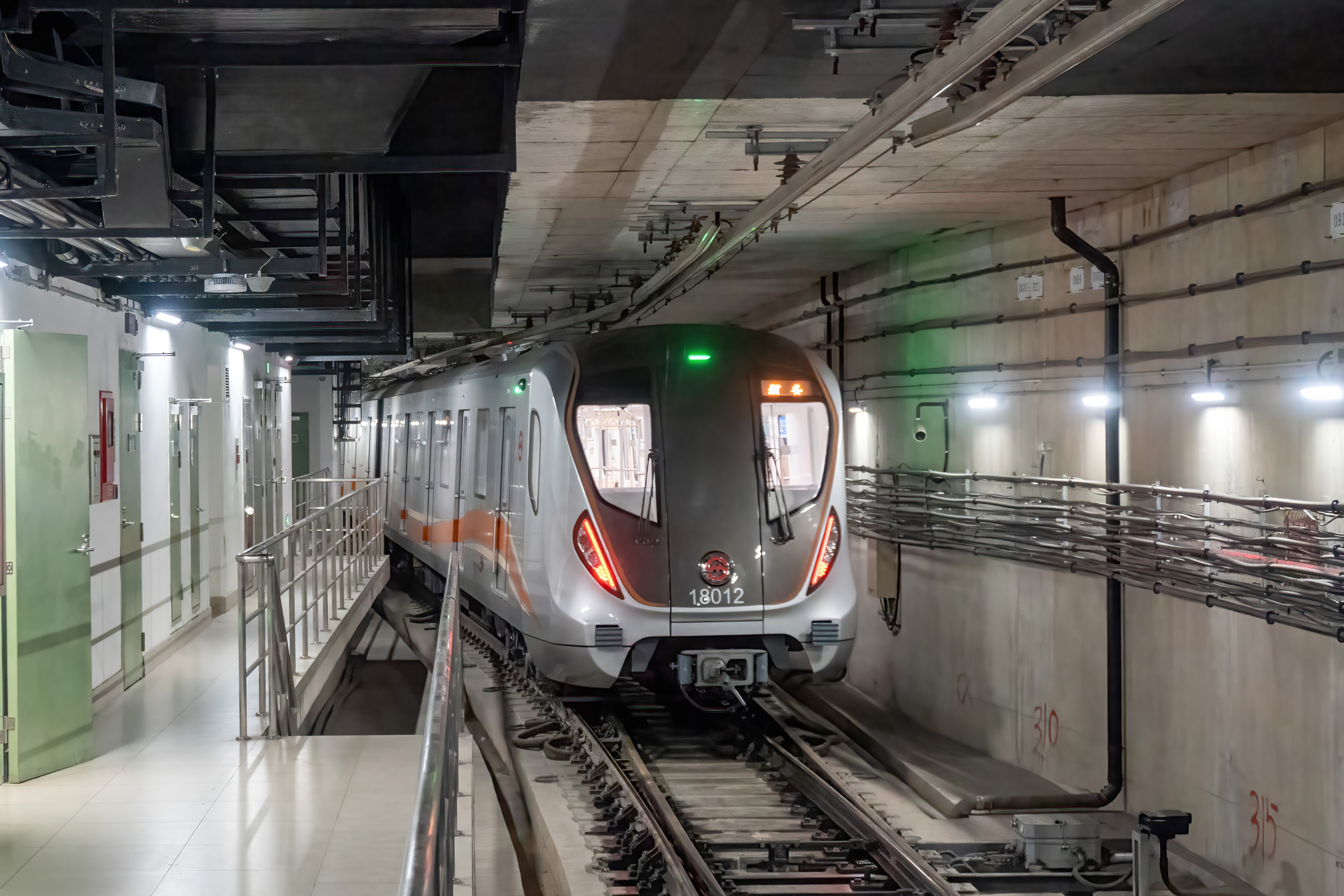
A Line 18 train departing Hangtou station
