= Kangwen Road station =

Metro station in Shanghai, China

Kangwen Road 康文路
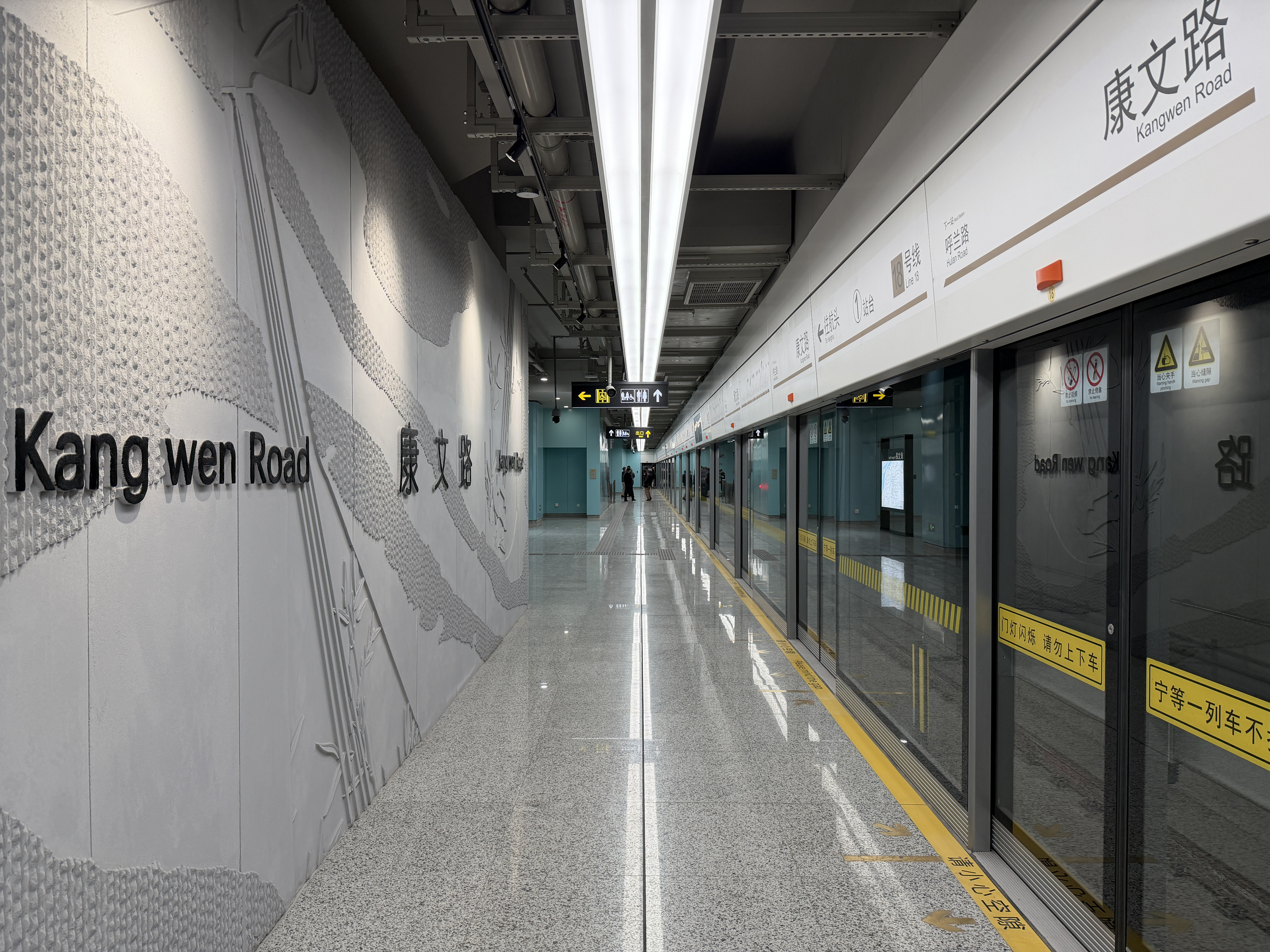
- Platform

General information
- Location: Baoshan District, Shanghai; China
- Coordinates: 31°20′14″N 121°24′57″E
- Line: Line 18
- Platforms: 2 (1 island platform)
- Tracks: 2

Construction
- Structure type: Underground
- Accessible: Yes

History
- Opened: 27 December 2025 (4 months ago)
- Previous names: Dakang Road (大康路)

Services
Preceding station	Shanghai Metro	Following station
Terminus	Line 18	Hulan Road towards Hangtou
Location

Kangwen Road (Chinese: 康文路; pinyin: Kángwén Lù) is a station on Shanghai Metro Line 18 located in the district of Baoshan in Shanghai, China. It serves as the north terminus of the line, and was officially opened on 27 December 2025.

== Structure ==
The station has an underground island platform. There are 3 entrance/exit gates.

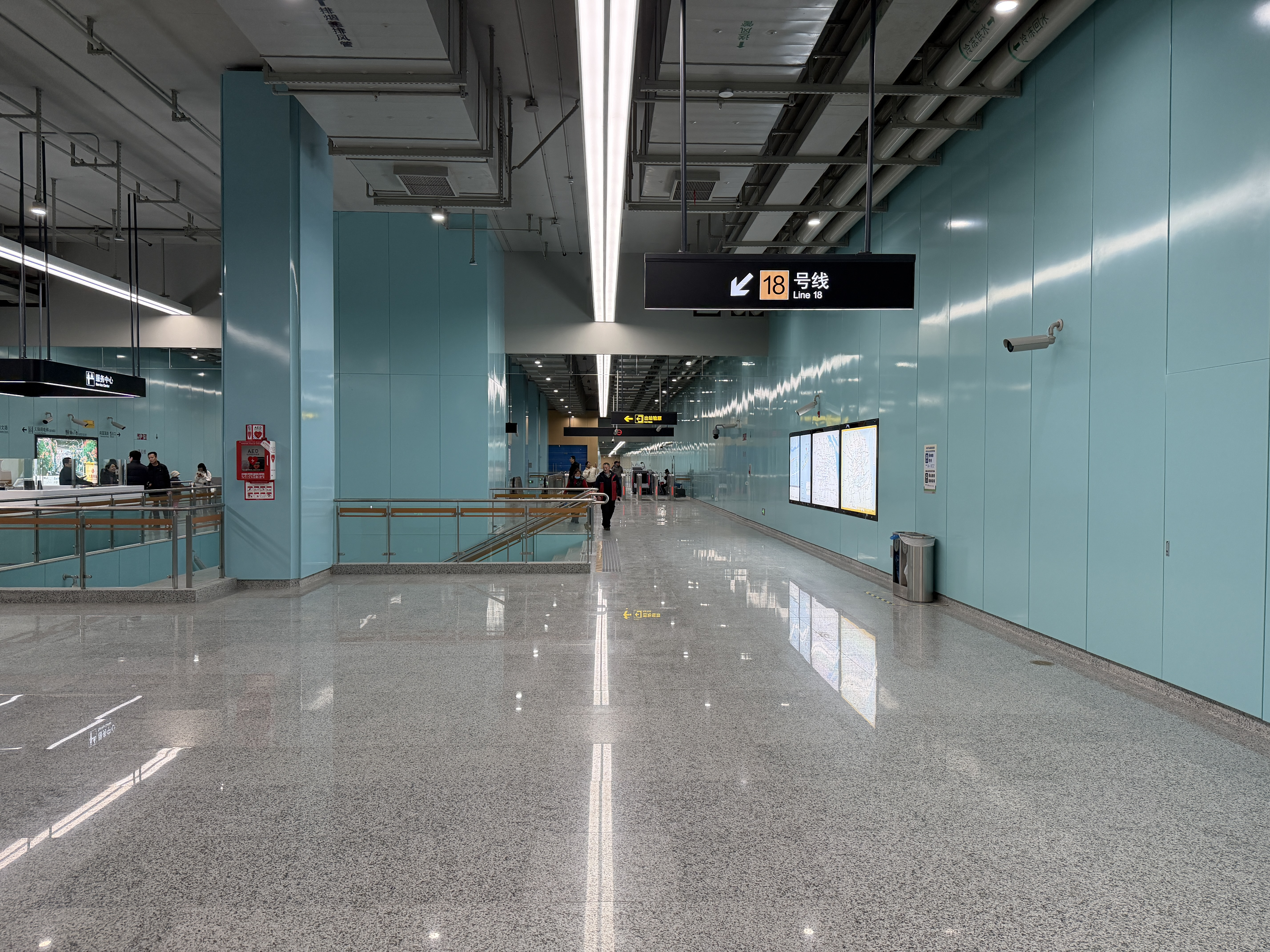
Concourse

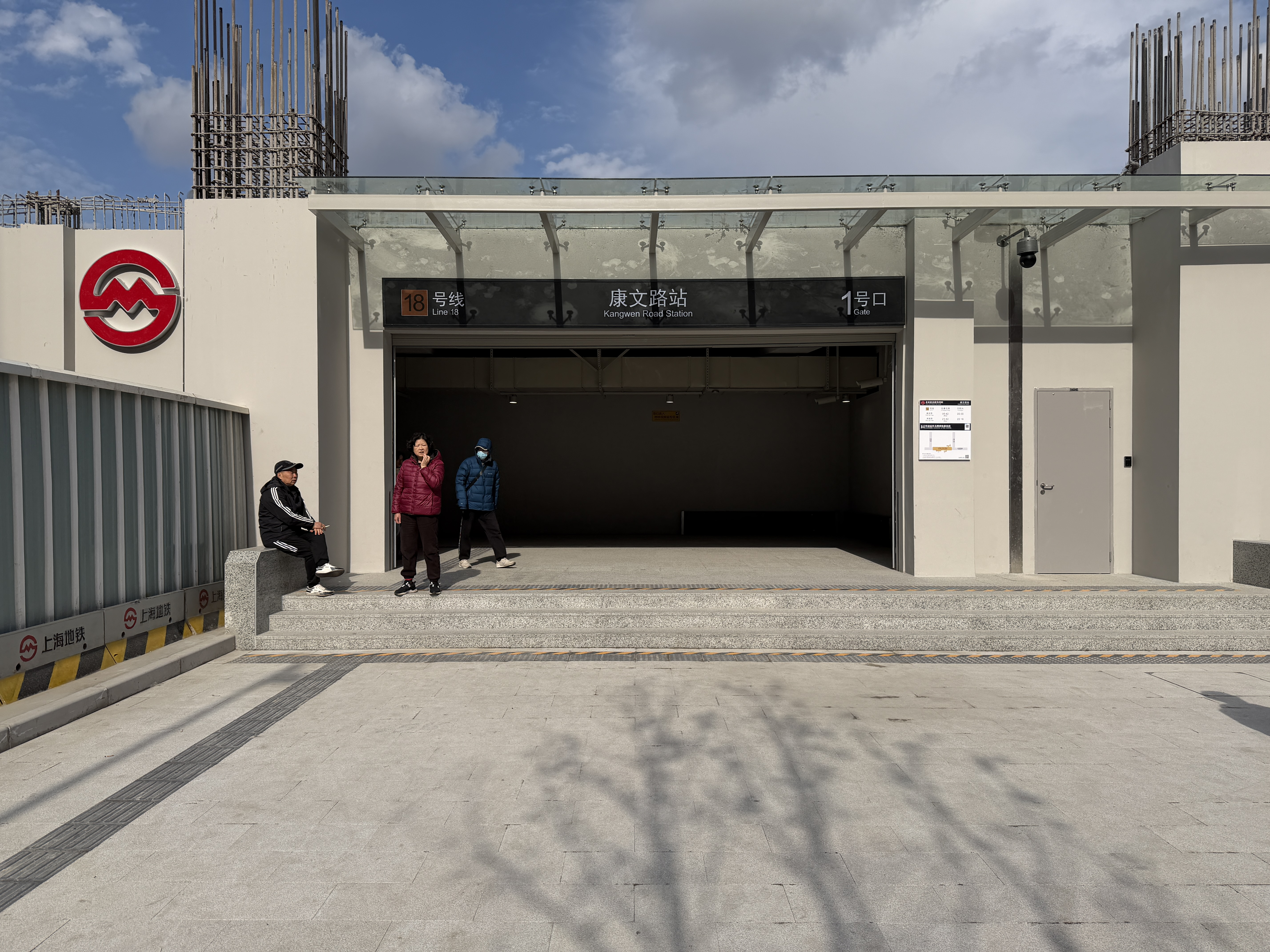
Gate 1

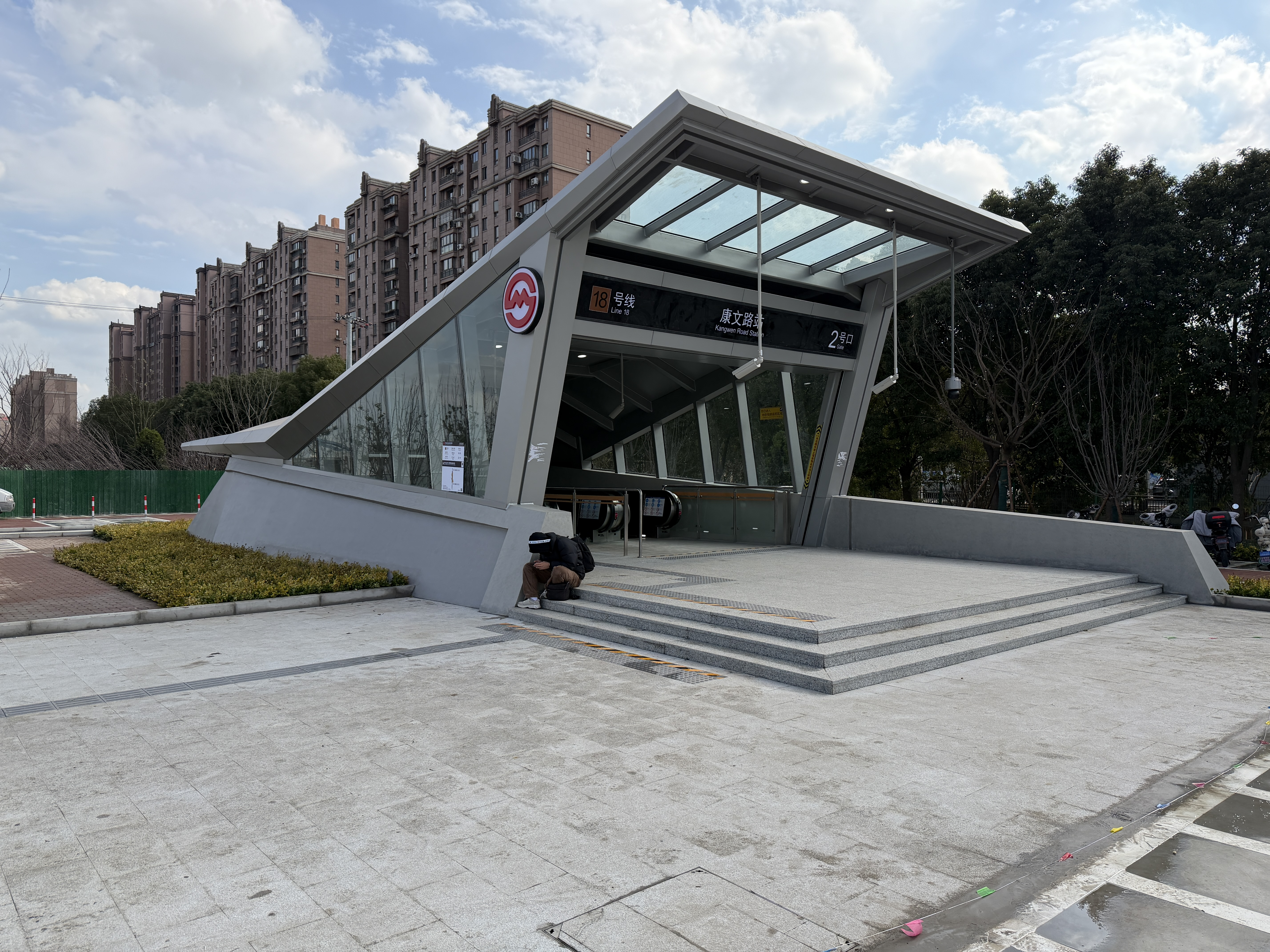
Gate 2

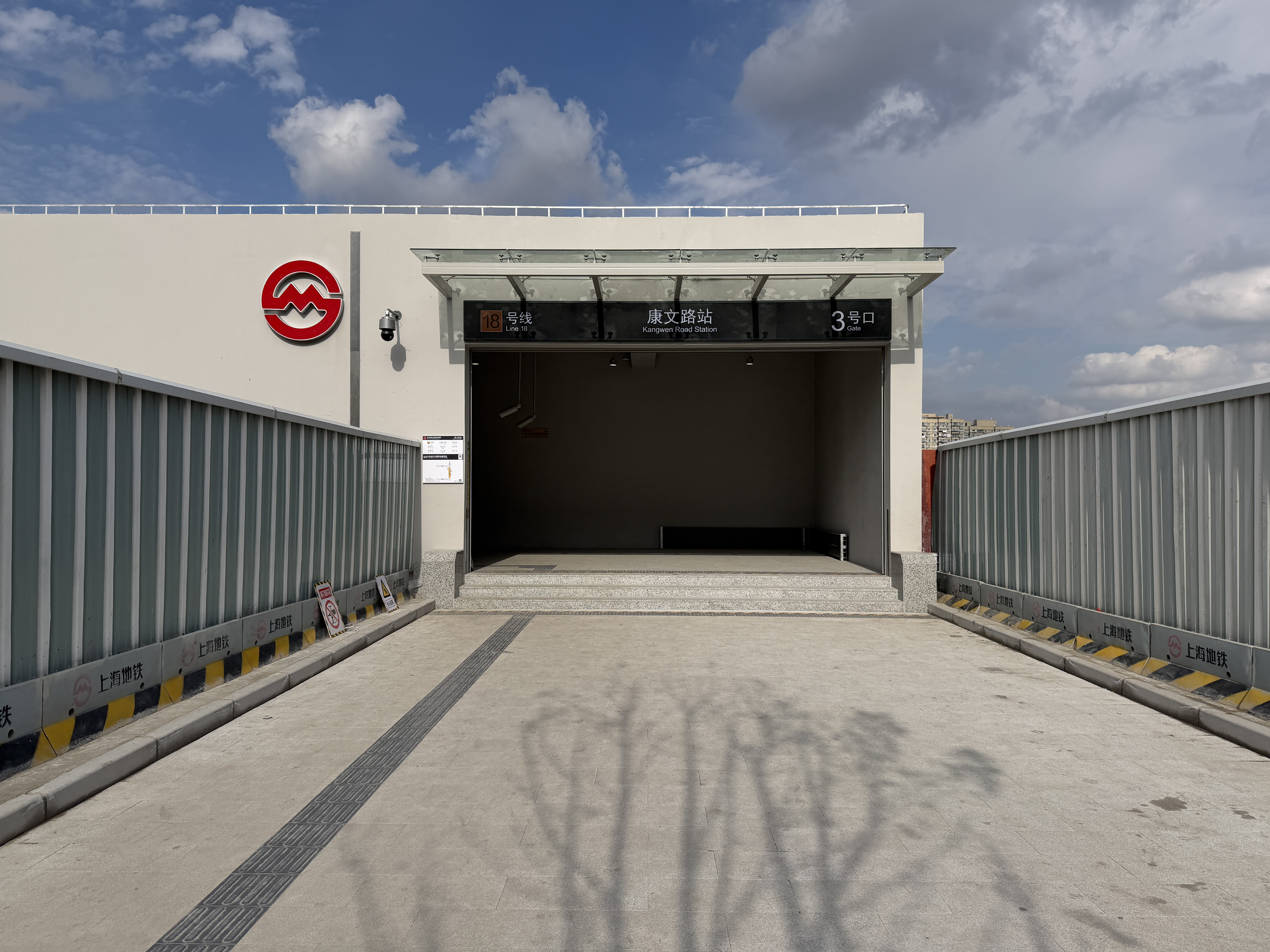
Gate 3
