= Pudian Road station =

Pudian Road station is the name of two different stations on the Shanghai Metro:

- Pudian Road station (line 4), renamed Xiangcheng Road station in 2024
- Pudian Road station (line 6)
