= Century Avenue station =

Shanghai Metro interchange station

Century Avenue 世纪大道
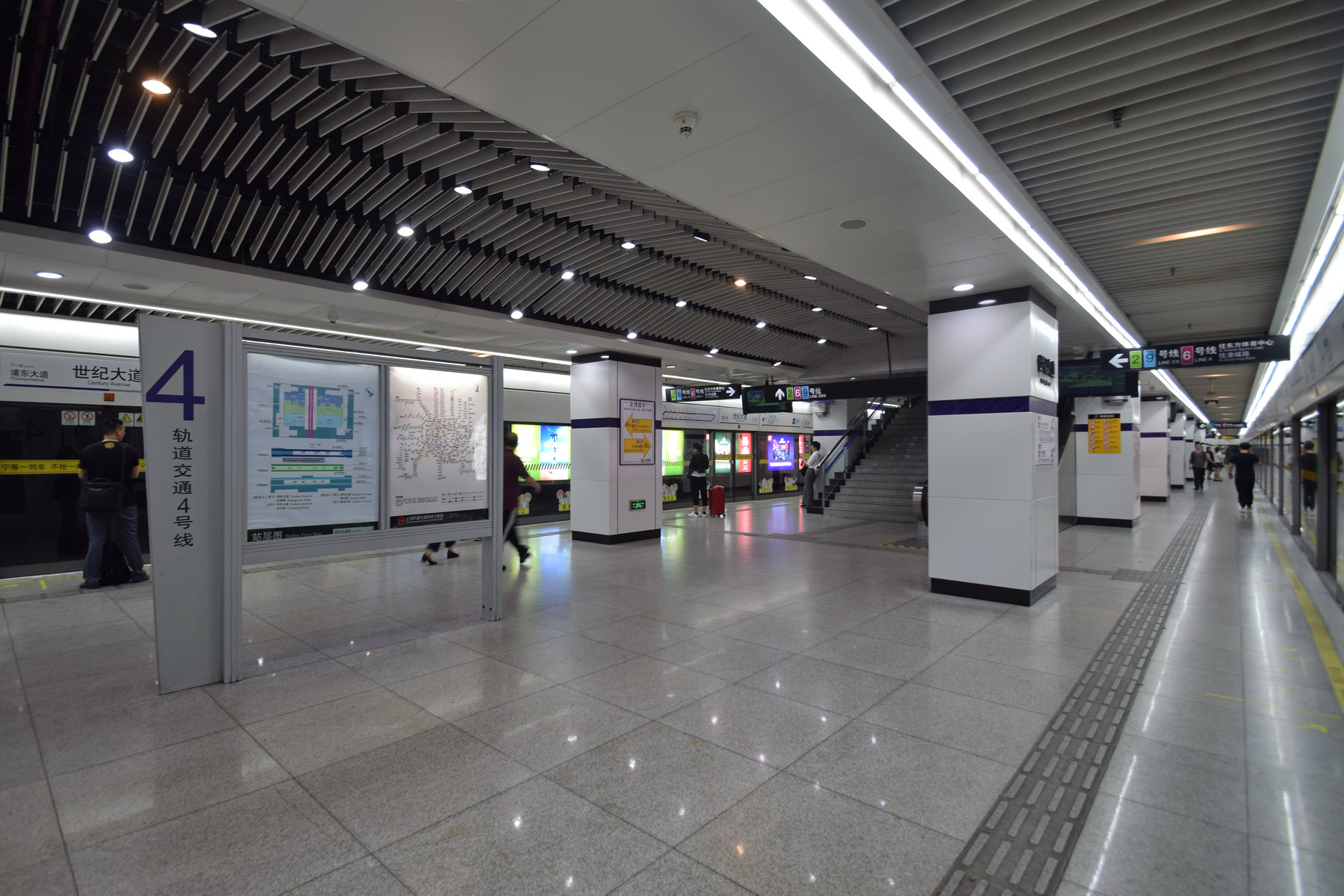
- Line 4 platform

General information
- Location: Intersection of Century Avenue, Dongfang Road, and Zhangyang Road; Pudong, Shanghai; China
- Coordinates: 31°13′43″N 121°31′38″E
- Operator: Shanghai No. 1/2/3/4 Metro Operation Co. Ltd.
- Lines: Line 2; Line 4; Line 6; Line 9
- Platforms: 8 (3 island platforms on Lines 2, 4 & 9 and 2 separate side platforms on Line 6)
- Tracks: 8

Construction
- Structure type: Underground
- Accessible: Yes

History
- Opened: 20 September 1999; 27 years ago (Line 2); 28 October 2006; 19 years ago (reopening; Lines 2 and 4); 29 December 2007; 18 years ago (Line 6); 31 December 2009; 16 years ago (Line 9)
- Closed: 22 October 2005; 21 years ago, has been reopened
- Former names: Dongfang Road (up to 28 October 2006)

Services
Preceding station	Shanghai Metro	Following station
South Pudong Road towards Panxiang Road · Shanghai National Accounting Institute	Line 2	Shanghai Science and Technology Museum towards Pudong Airport Terminal 1&2
Xiangcheng Road Clockwise	Line 4	Pudong Avenue Counter-clockwise
Yuanshen Sports Center towards Gangcheng Road	Line 6	Pudian Road towards Oriental Sports Center
Shangcheng Road towards Shanghai Songjiang Railway Station	Line 9	Middle Yanggao Road towards Caolu
Location
- Location within Shanghai

Century Avenue (Chinese: 世纪大道; pinyin: Shìjì Dàdào) is a major Shanghai Metro interchange station named after Century Avenue, which runs above the station. It is currently one of two stations (the other one being Longyang Road station) on the Shanghai Metro network to serve four lines (namely Lines 2, 4, 6 and 9), and the first four-line interchange metro or subway station in mainland China.

This station, first known as Dongfang Road station (东方路站), is part of the initial section of Line 2 that opened from Zhongshan Park to Longyang Road that opened on 20 September 1999. Beginning on 22 October 2005, the station closed for reconfiguration and improvements in preparation for the planned 4-line interchange with Lines 4, 6, and 9. On 28 October 2006, the station was reopened and first served as an interchange between Lines 2 and 4, and the name was changed to the present Century Avenue according to the new convention to name metro stations after famous streets or sights in the vicinity. The interchange with Line 6 opened on 29 December 2007 as part of that line's initial section between Gangcheng Road and South Lingyan Road, while the fourth interchange with Line 9, part of the line's downtown (Century Avenue to Yishan Road) section, opened on 31 December 2009.

The station uses an optimized interchange solution. Line 6 uses two side platforms on the upper underground level and heads north–south, while Lines 2, 4 and 9 all use island platforms on the lower level and head east–west.

== Station layout ==
1F	Ground level	Exits 1, 6, 7, 12
B1	Concourse A	Exits 2, 11, Tickets, Service Center
B1	Side platform, doors open on the right
B1		← Line 6 towards Gangcheng Road (Yuanshen Sports Center)
B1		Line 6 towards Oriental Sports Center (Pudian Road) →
B1	Side platform, doors open on the right
B1	Concourse B	Exits 5, 8, Tickets, Service Center
B2	Platform 1	← Line 2 towards Panxiang Road · Shanghai National Accounting Institute (South Pudong Road)
B2	Island platform, doors open on the left
B2	Platform 2	Line 2 towards Pudong Airport Terminal 1&2 (Shanghai Science and Technology Museum) →
B2	Platform 7	← Line 9 towards Shanghai Songjiang Railway Station (Shangcheng Road)
B2	Island platform, doors open on the left
B2	Platform 8	Line 9 towards Caolu (Middle Yanggao Road) →
B3	Platform 1	← Line 4 counter-clockwise (Pudong Avenue)
B3	Island platform, doors open on the left
B3	Platform 2	Line 4 clockwise (Xiangcheng Road) →

=== Entrances/exits ===
- 1: Century Avenue, Dongfang Road
- 2: Pudong Century Metropolis
- 5: Pudong Century Metropolis
- 6: Century Avenue, Fushan Road
- 7: Century Avenue, Weifang Road
- 8: Century Link Tower
- 11: Century Link Tower
- 12: Century Avenue, Dongfang Road

== Gallery ==
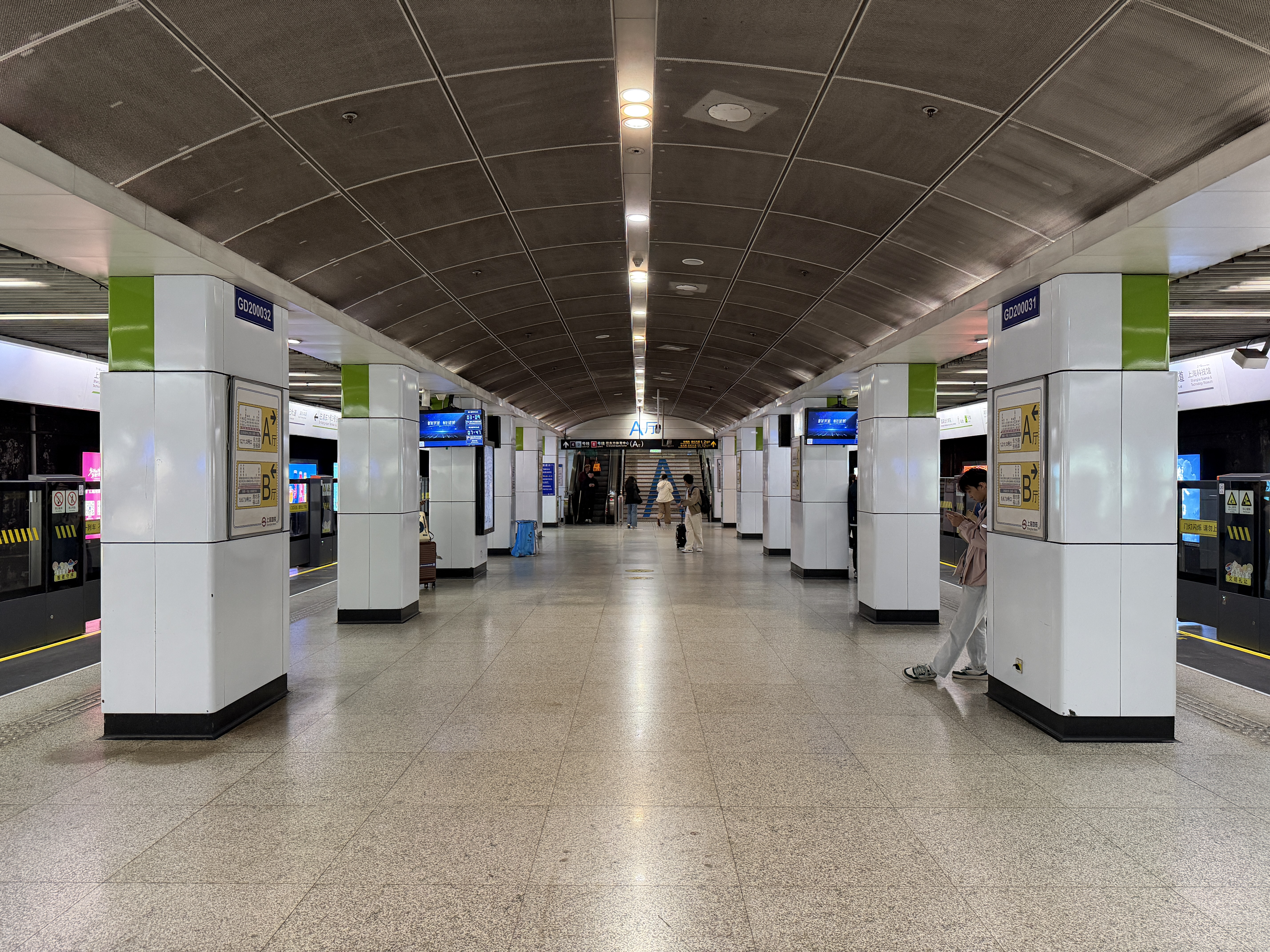
Line 2 platform

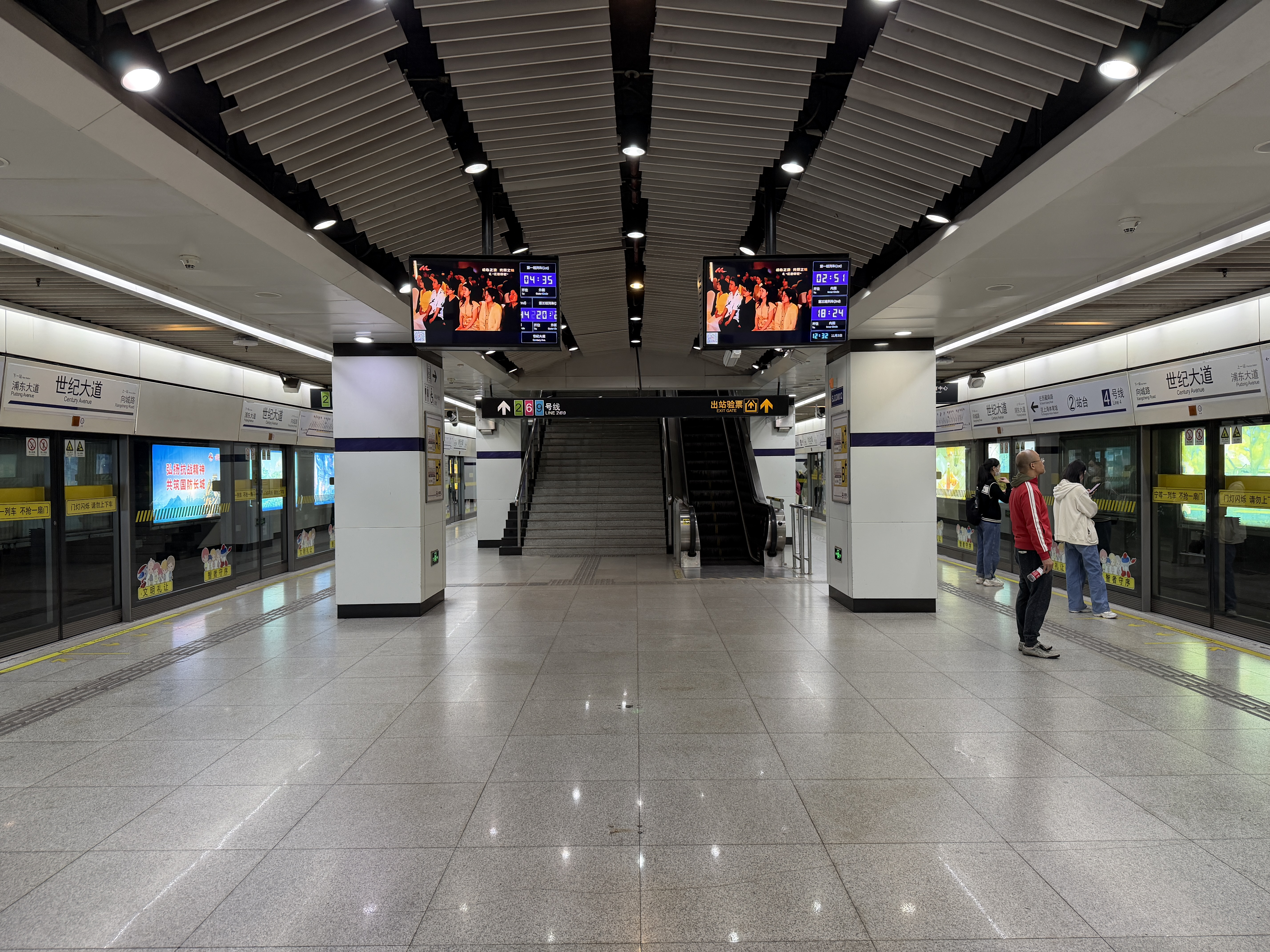
Line 4 platform

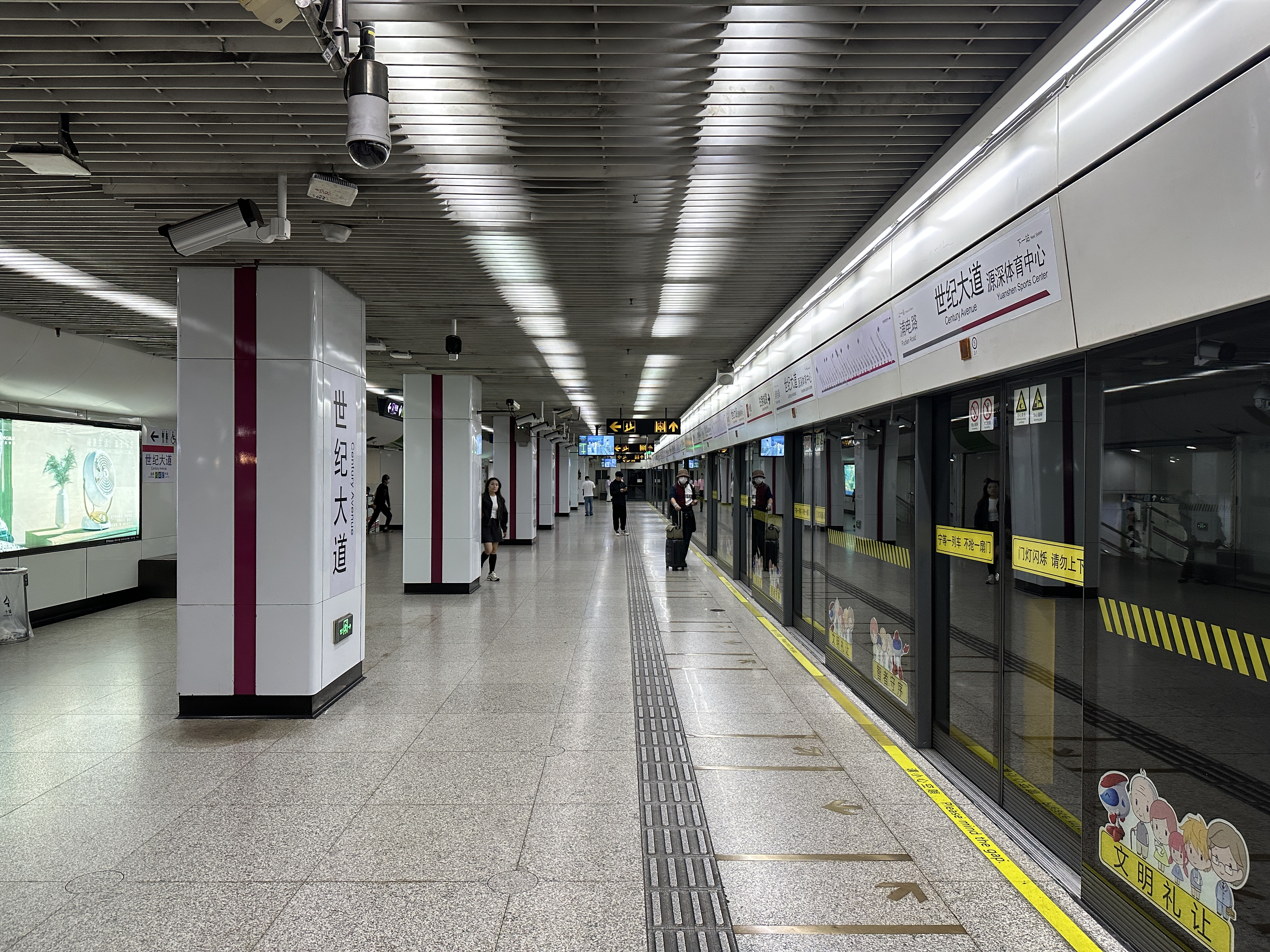
Line 6 platform

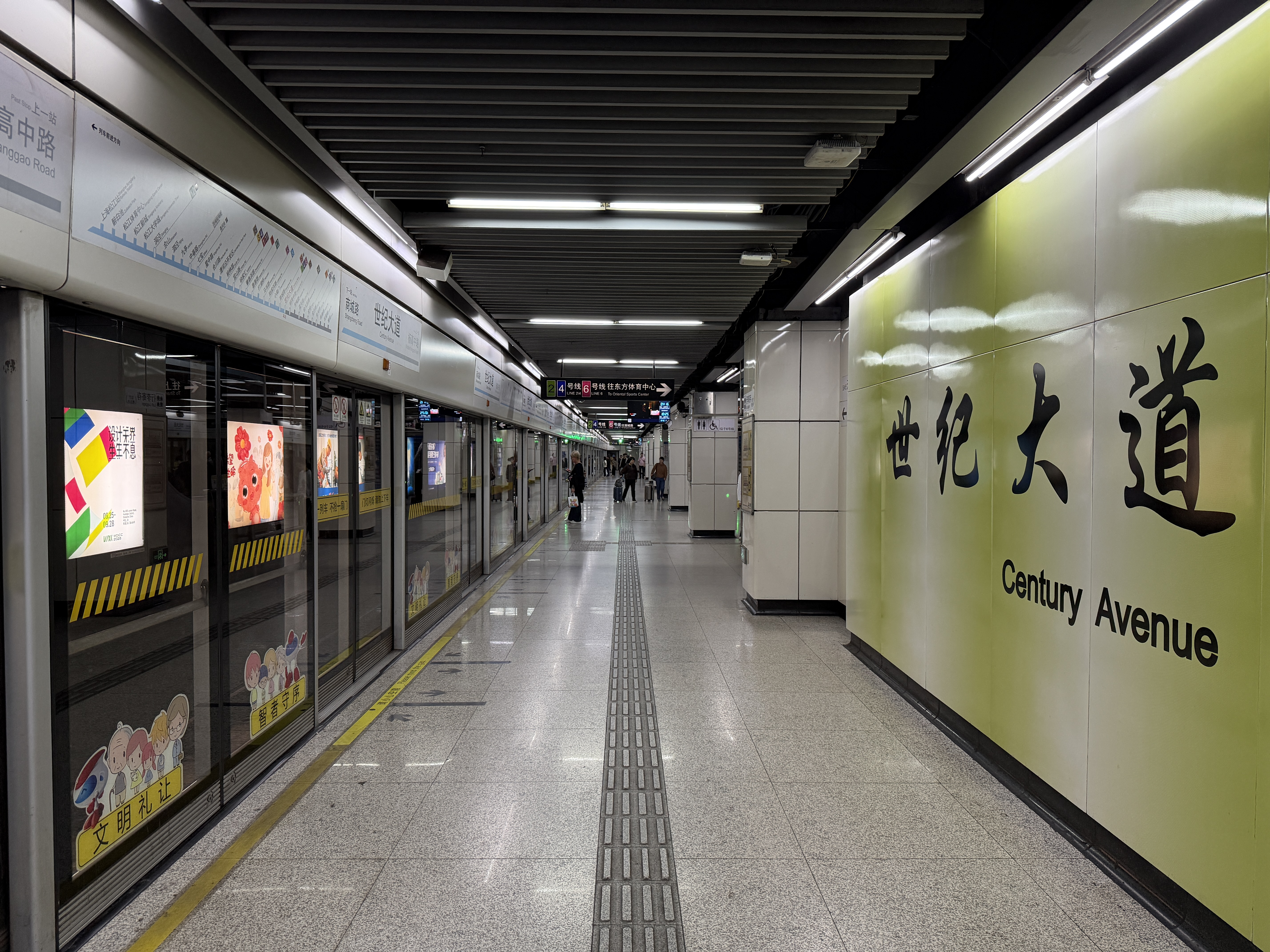
Line 9 platform
