= Beiyangjing Road station =

Shanghai Metro station

Beiyangjing Road 北洋泾路
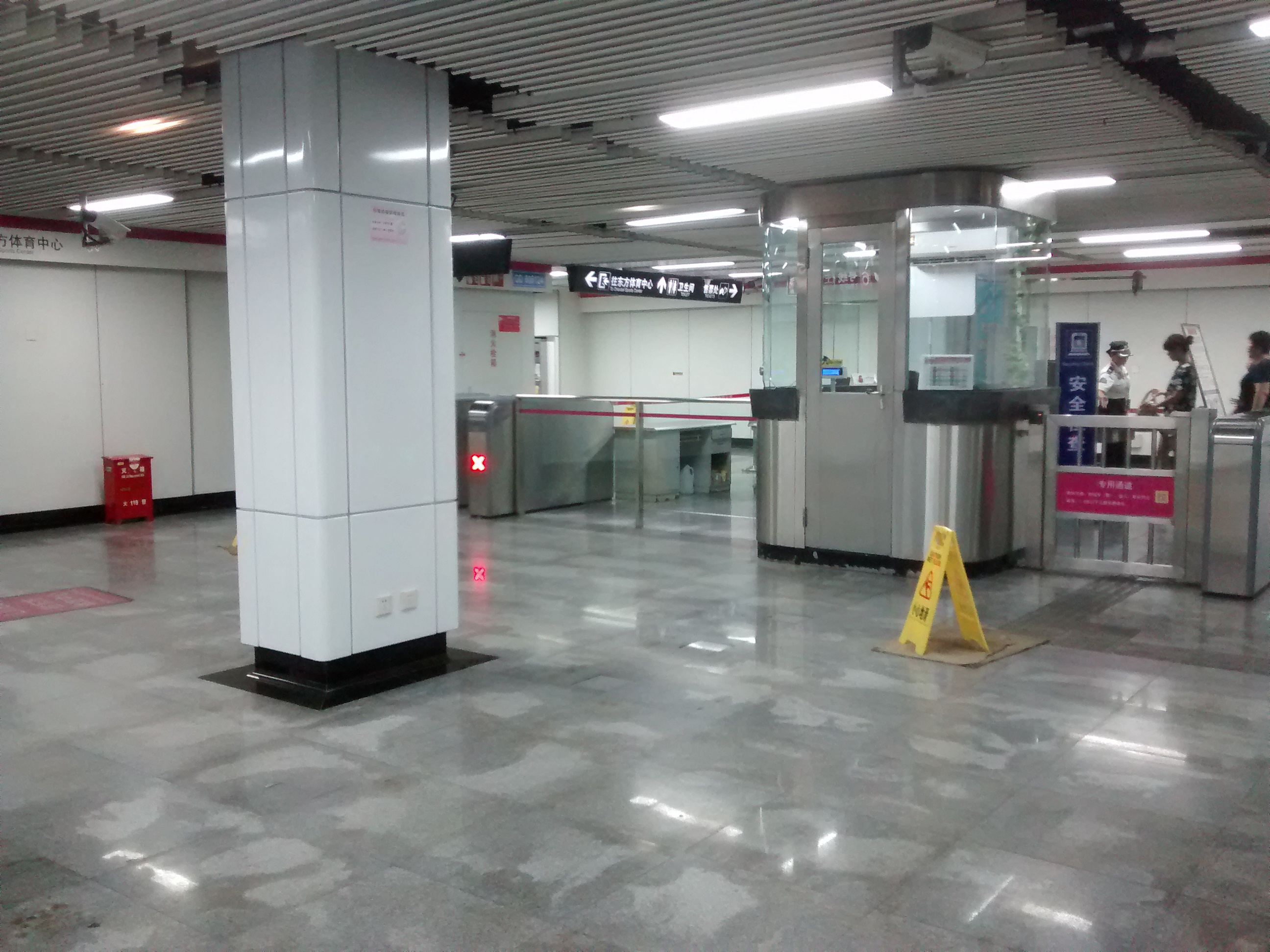
- Station concourse

General information
- Location: Zhangyang Road, Beiyangjing Road (北洋泾路); Pudong, Shanghai; China
- Coordinates: 31°14′28″N 121°32′51″E
- Operator: Shanghai No. 4 Metro Operation Co. Ltd.
- Line: Line 6
- Platforms: 2 (2 side platforms)
- Tracks: 2

Construction
- Structure type: Underground
- Accessible: Yes

History
- Opened: December 29, 2007

Services
Preceding station	Shanghai Metro	Following station
Deping Road towards Gangcheng Road	Line 6	Minsheng Road towards Oriental Sports Center
Location
- Location within Shanghai

Beiyangjing Road (simplified Chinese: 北洋泾路; traditional Chinese: 北洋涇路; pinyin: Běiyángjīng Lù) is a station on Line 6 of the Shanghai Metro. It began services on December 29, 2007. There are two side platforms, and the station's main color is blue. There are three exits, all of which are on Zhangyang Road.

== Bus routes ==
169, 339, 630, 638, 736, 773, 783, 783 alt, 790, 791, 935, 961, 975
