= Minsheng Road station =

Shanghai Metro station

Minsheng Road 民生路
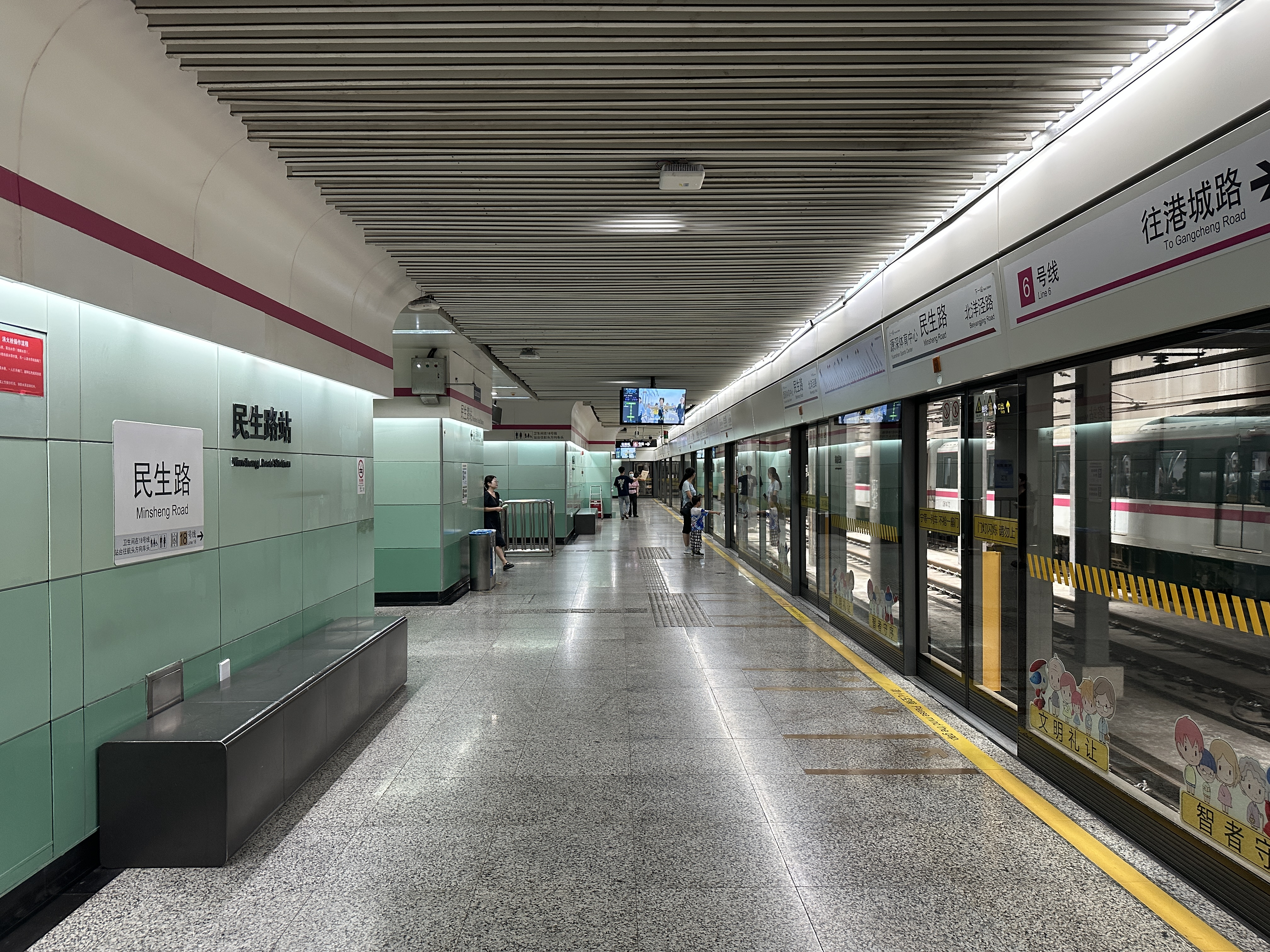
- Line 6 station platform

General information
- Location: Zhangyang Road and Minsheng Road; Pudong, Shanghai; China
- Coordinates: 31°14′17″N 121°32′19″E
- Operator: Shanghai No. 4 Metro Operation Co. Ltd.
- Lines: Line 6; Line 18
- Platforms: 4 (1 island platform and 2 side platforms)
- Tracks: 5

Construction
- Structure type: Underground
- Accessible: Yes

History
- Opened: 29 December 2007 (Line 6); 30 December 2021 (Line 18)

Services
Preceding station	Shanghai Metro	Following station
Beiyangjing Road towards Gangcheng Road	Line 6	Yuanshen Sports Center towards Oriental Sports Center
Changyi Road towards Kangwen Road	Line 18	Middle Yanggao Road towards Hangtou
Location
- Location within Shanghai

Minsheng Road (Chinese: 民生路; pinyin: Mínshēng Lù) is a station on Line 6 of the Shanghai Metro. It began services on 29 December 2007. It later became an interchange station after the opening of Line 18 on 30 December 2021.

== Station Layout ==
G	Entrances and Exits	Exits 1-6
B1	Line 6 Concourse	Faregates, Station Agent
B2	Line 14 Concourse	Faregates, Station Agent
B2	Side platform, doors open on the right
B2	Northbound	← Line 6 towards Gangcheng Road (Beiyangjing Road)
B2	Side track	Line 6 siding
B2	Southbound	Line 6 towards Oriental Sports Center (Yuanshen Sports Center) →
B2	Side platform, doors open on the right
B3	Northbound	← Line 18 towards South Changjiang Road (Changyi Road)
B3	Island platform, doors open on the left
B3	Southbound	Line 18 towards Hangtou (Middle Yanggao Road) →
