= Yuanshen Sports Center station =

Shanghai Metro station

Yuanshen Sports Center 源深体育中心
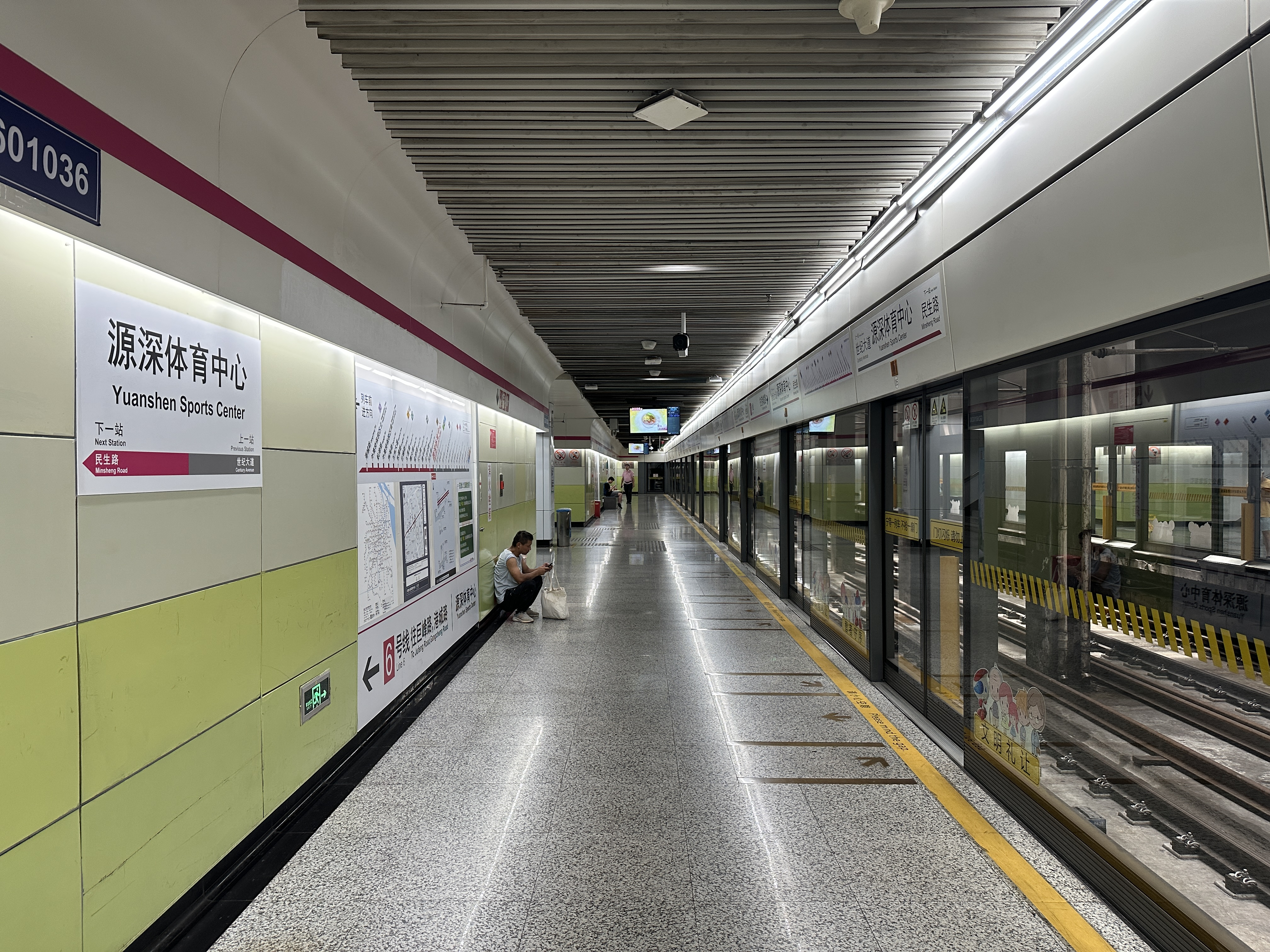
- Station platform

General information
- Other names: Yuanshen Stadium (before 21 September 2024)
- Location: Zhangyang Road and Yuanshen Road; Pudong, Shanghai; China
- Coordinates: 31°14′6″N 121°31′47″E
- Operator: Shanghai No. 4 Metro Operation Co. Ltd.
- Line: Line 6
- Platforms: 2 (2 side platforms)
- Tracks: 2

Construction
- Structure type: Underground
- Accessible: Yes

History
- Opened: 29 December 2007; 18 years ago

Services
Preceding station	Shanghai Metro	Following station
Minsheng Road towards Gangcheng Road	Line 6	Century Avenue towards Oriental Sports Center
Location
- Location within Shanghai

Yuanshen Sports Center (Note: The English name of the station was Yuanshen Stadium prior to 21 September 2024.) (simplified Chinese: 源深体育中心; traditional Chinese: 源深體育中心; pinyin: Yuánshēn Tǐyùzhōngxīn) is a station on Line 6 of the Shanghai Metro. It began services on December 29, 2007. It is underground with side platforms, sandwiched between two interchange stations on Line 6. It is located at the junction of Zhangyang Road and Yuanshen Road. It is very close to Lujiazui financial district, and is sometimes included as part of it.

== Around the station ==
- Pudong Mosque
