= Pudong Mosque =

Mosque in Pudong, Shanghai, China

- 浦东清真寺
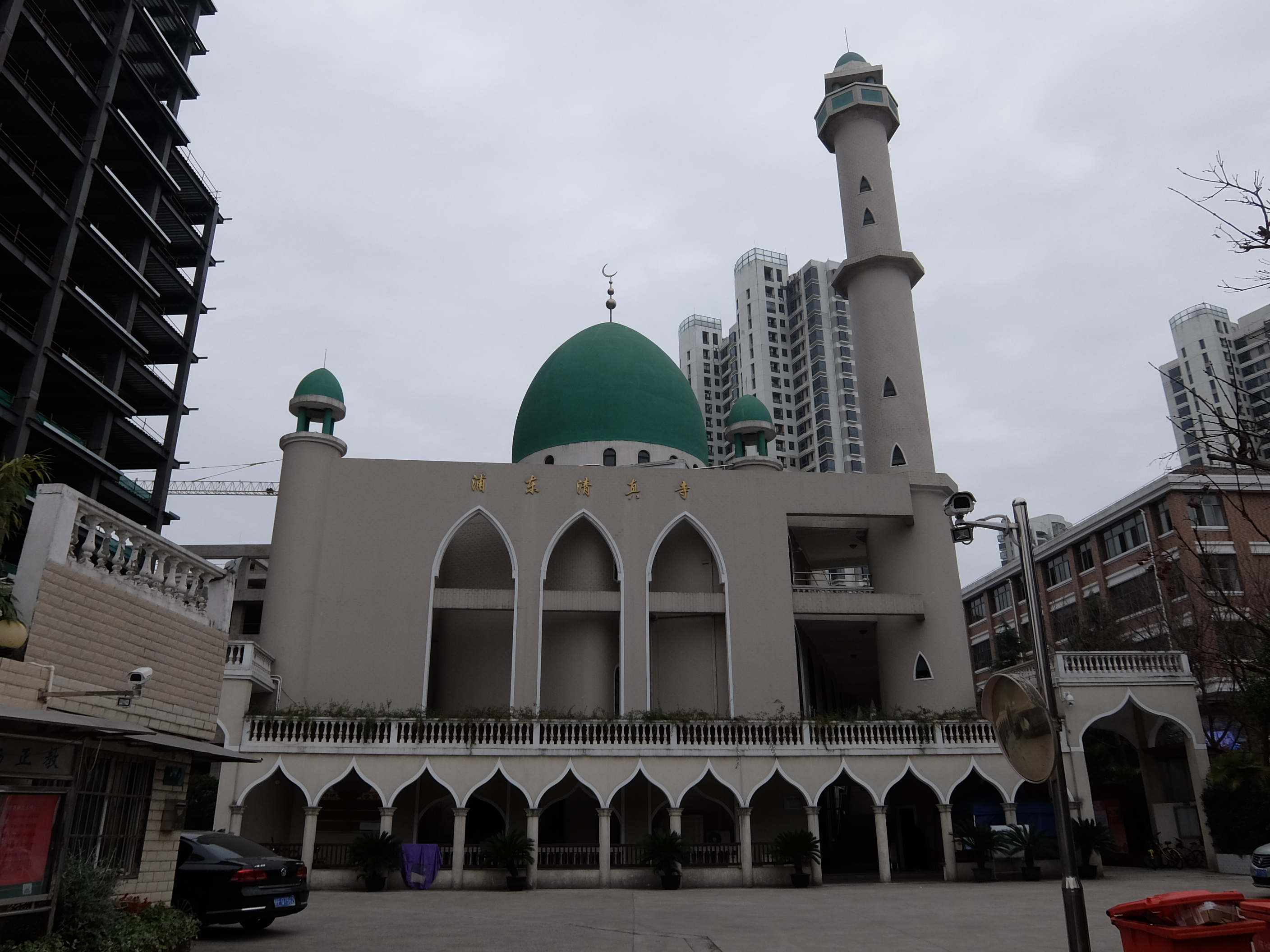

- Location of the mosque in Shanghai

Religion
- Affiliation: Islam
- Branch/tradition: Sunni
- Ecclesiastical or organizational status: mosque
- Status: Active

Location
- Location: 375 Yuanshen Road, Pudong, Shanghai
- Country: China
- Interactive map of Pudong Mosque
- Coordinates: 31°14′16″N 121°31′44″E

Architecture
- Type: mosque
- Style: Islamic
- Completed: 1935 (original building); 1995 (current building)

Specifications
- Capacity: 850 worshipers
- Interior area: 1,650 m^{2} (17,800 sq ft)
- Dome: 4
- Minaret: 1
- Minaret height: 40 m (130 ft)

The Pudong Mosque (simplified Chinese: 浦东清真寺; traditional Chinese: 浦東清真寺; pinyin: Pǔdōng Qīngzhēnsì) is a mosque in Pudong, Shanghai, China.

== History ==
The mosque was constructed in 1935 at 16 Wujiating, Pudong Avenue. It underwent expansion in 1984 due to its small size. In 1995, the mosque was rebuilt at its present location with the support and funding from Pudong District government.

== Architecture ==
The mosque covers 1,650 square metres (17,800 sq ft) that includes a sahn, prayer hall, imam room, wudu, and office. The building has light-colored exterior with green dome. The main building consists of three floors built with Arabic style of architecture. It has a 40-metre-high (130 ft) minaret and three smaller domes. The mosque also features shop selling books, religious materials and food.

The main prayer room can accommodate 500 worshipers with additional prayer room at the back to be opened during Friday prayer that can accommodate 300 worshiper and the female prayer room section that can accommodate 50 worshipers.

== Transportation ==
The mosque is accessible within walking distance north of Yuanshen Sports Center Station of Shanghai Metro.

== See also ==
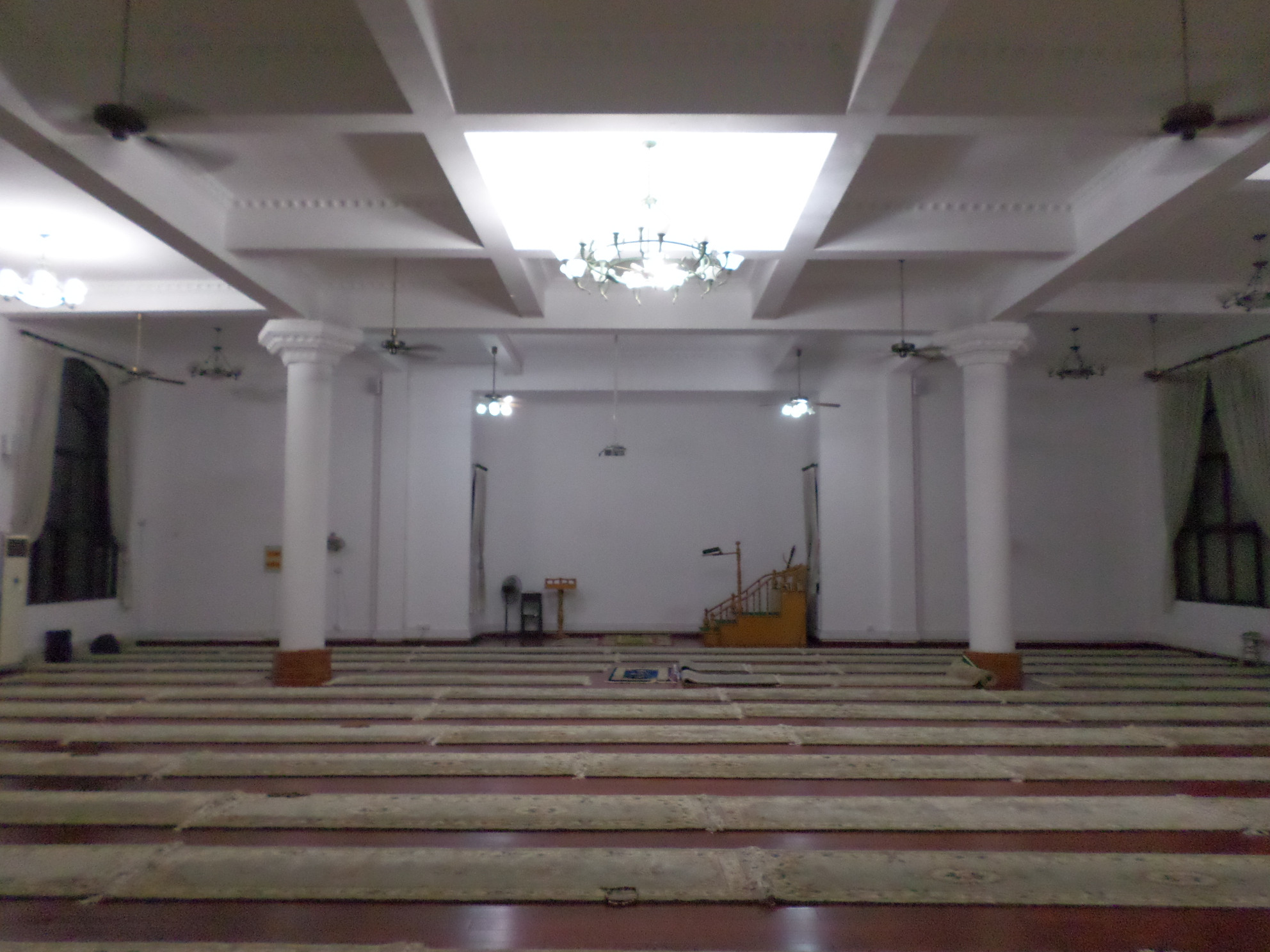
The mosque prayer hall

- Islam in China
- List of mosques in China
