= Deping Road station =

Shanghai Metro station

Deping Road 德平路
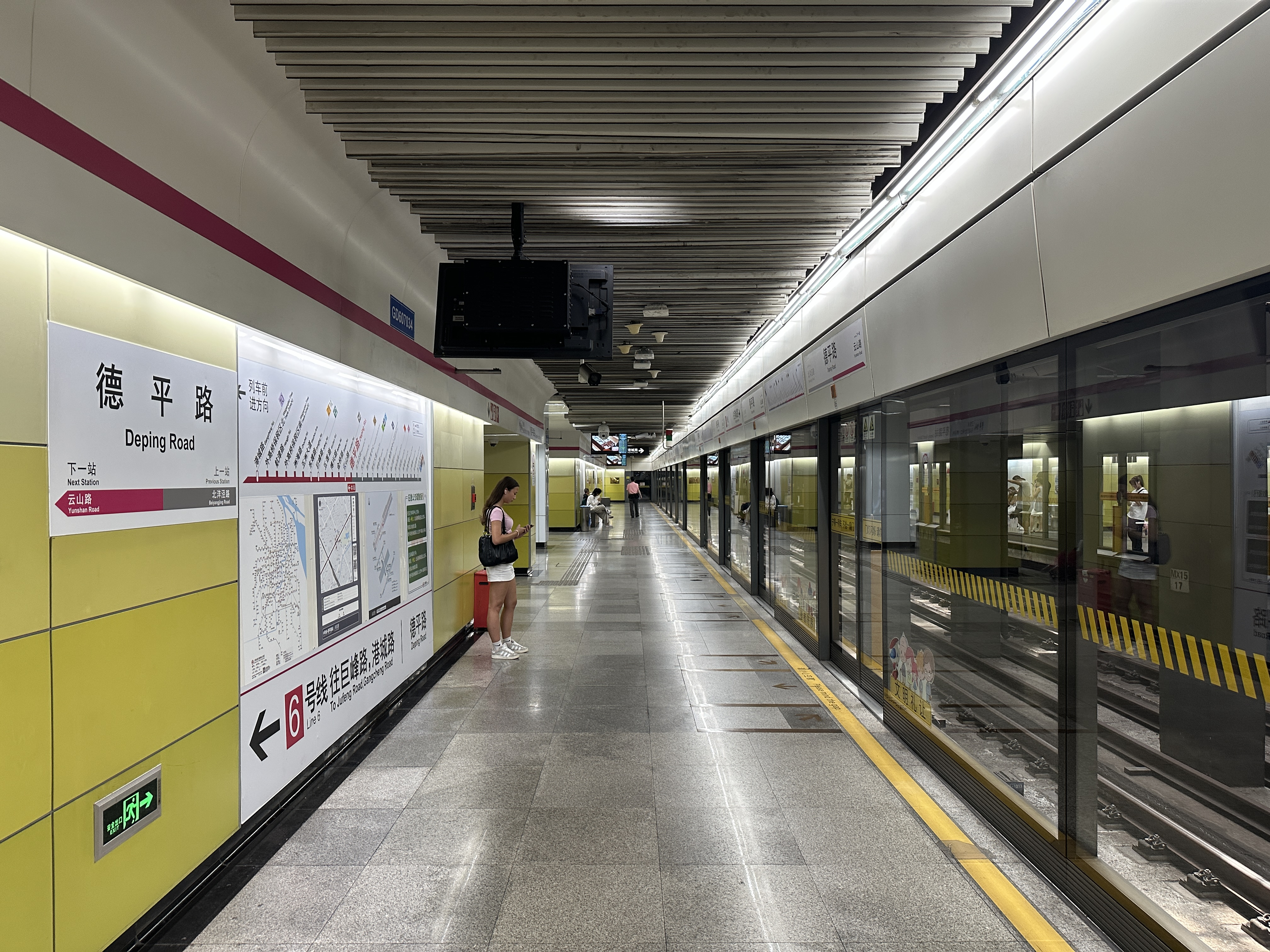
- Station platform

General information
- Location: Zhangyang Road and Deping Road (德平路); Yangjing subdistrict, Pudong, Shanghai; China
- Coordinates: 31.2475°N 121.559°E
- Operator: Shanghai No. 4 Metro Operation Co. Ltd.
- Line: Line 6
- Platforms: 2 (2 side platforms)
- Tracks: 2

Construction
- Structure type: Underground
- Accessible: Yes

History
- Opened: December 29, 2007

Services
Preceding station	Shanghai Metro	Following station
Yunshan Road towards Gangcheng Road	Line 6	Beiyangjing Road towards Oriental Sports Center
Location
- Location within Shanghai

Deping Road (Chinese: 德平路; pinyin: Dépíng Lù) is a station on Line 6 of the Shanghai Metro. It began operation on December 29, 2007. There are a total of four exits in the station.

The station is located at the junction of Zhangyang Road and Deping Road, in Shanghai's Pudong New Area.
