= Changyi Road station =

Metro station in Shanghai, China

Changyi Road 昌邑路
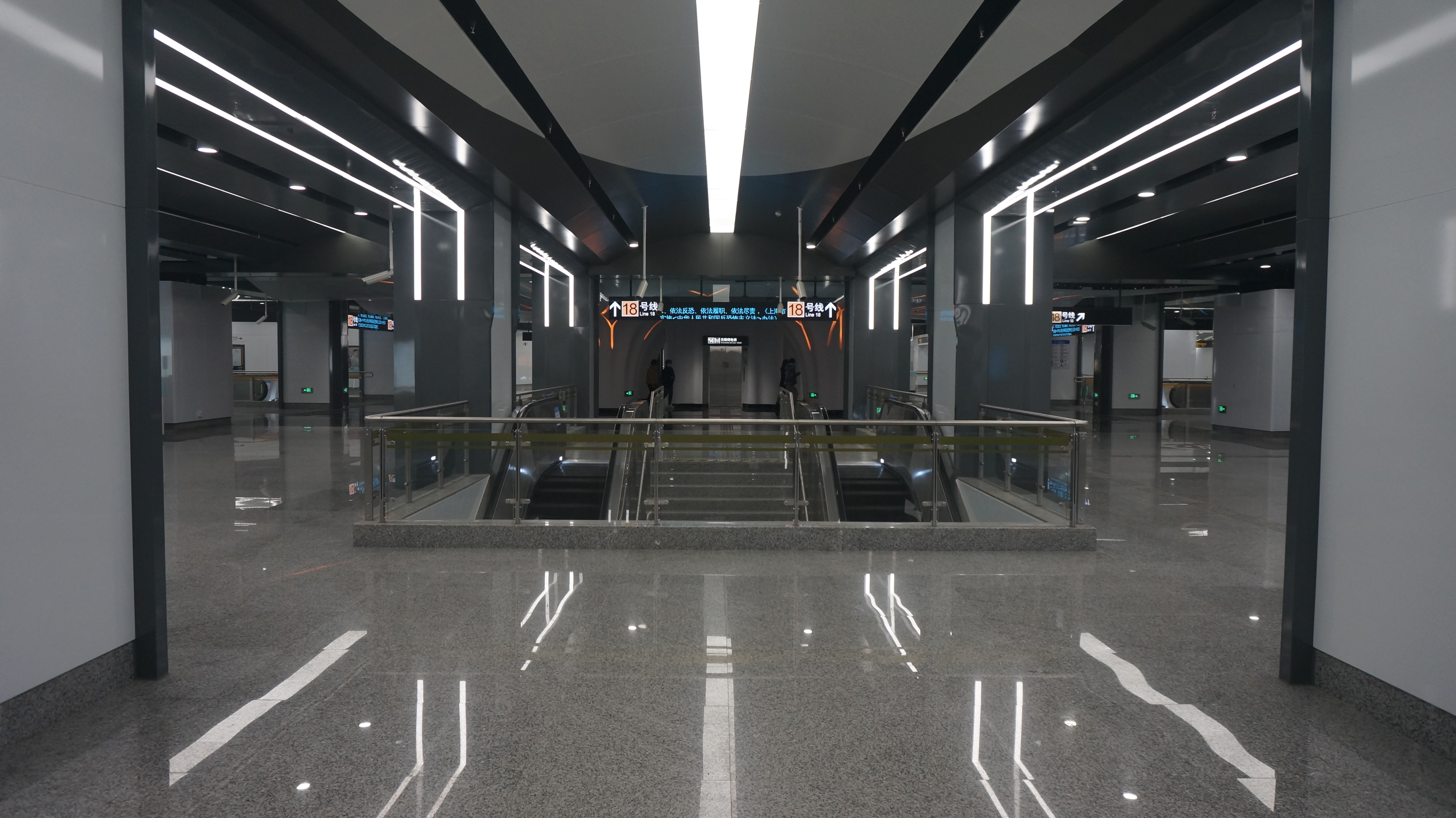
- Station hall of Changyi Road

General information
- Location: Minsheng Road and Pudong Avenue, Pudong, Shanghai; China
- Coordinates: 31.246074°N 121.535720°E
- Lines: Line 14; Line 18
- Platforms: 4 (2 island platforms)
- Tracks: 4

Construction
- Structure type: Underground
- Accessible: Yes

History
- Opened: 30 December 2021 (Lines 14 and 18)

Services
Preceding station	Shanghai Metro	Following station
Yuanshen Road towards Fengbang	Line 14	Xiepu Road towards Guiqiao Road
Danyang Road towards Kangwen Road	Line 18	Minsheng Road towards Hangtou
Location

Changyi Road (Chinese: 昌邑路) is part of an interchange station of Lines 14 and 18 of the Shanghai Metro. Located at the intersection of Minsheng Road and Pudong Avenue in Pudong, Shanghai, the station opened on 30 December 2021, when both lines began operations. Its name is taken from the adjacent parallel street just north of the station, Changyi Road. It's one of the featured stations of the two lines, with tree-like structures and changing color lights, attracting passengers to take photos.

== Station Layout ==
G	Entrances and Exits	Exits 1-6
B1	Concourse	Faregates, Station Agent
B2	Westbound	← Line 14 towards Fengbang (Yuanshen Road)
B2	Island platform, doors open on the left
B2	Eastbound	Line 14 towards Guiqiao Road (Xiepu Road) →
B3	Northbound	← Line 18 towards South Changjiang Road (Danyang Road)
B3	Island platform, doors open on the left
B3	Southbound	Line 18 towards Hangtou (Minsheng Road) →

== Gallery ==
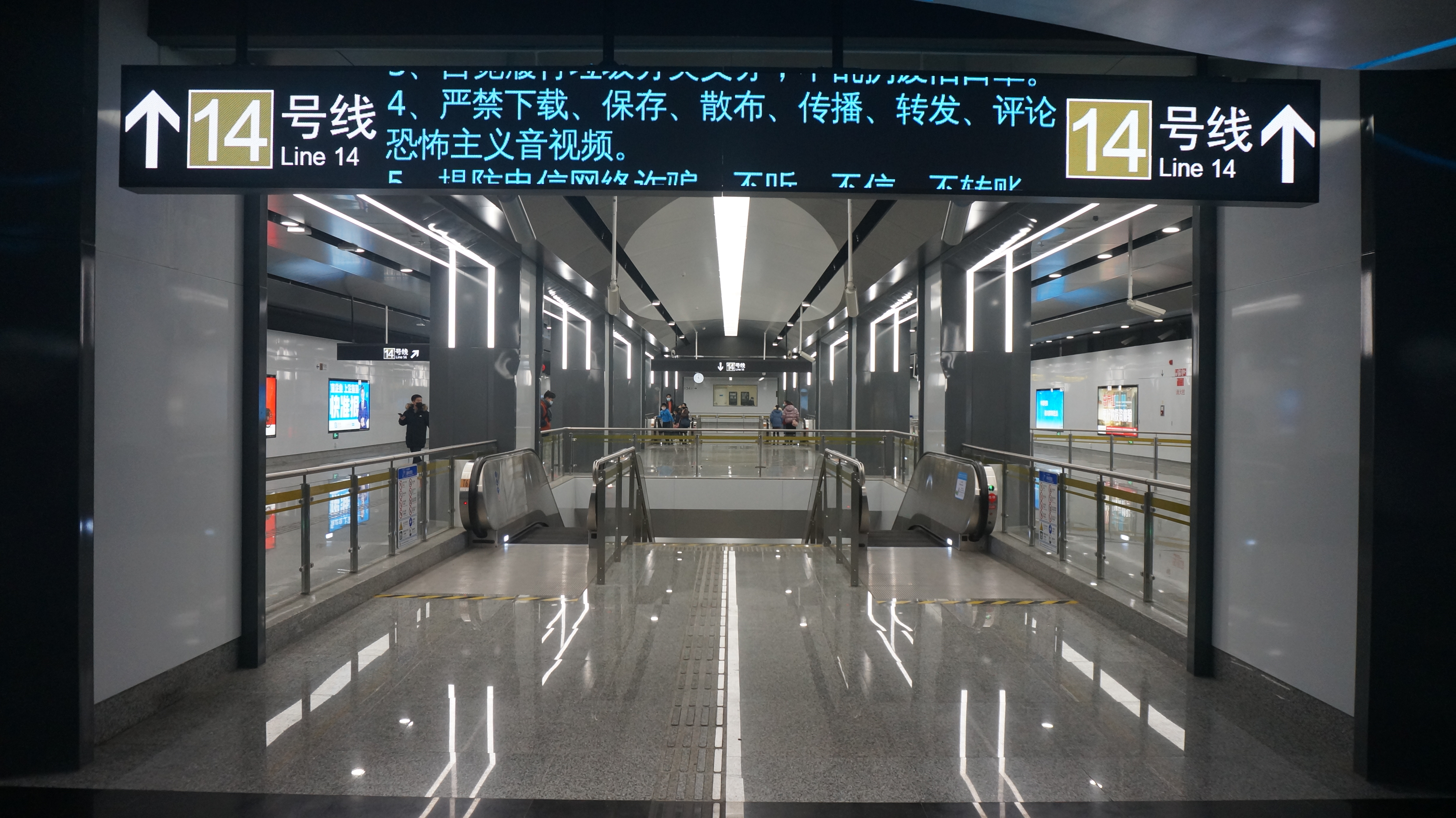
Line 14 station hall

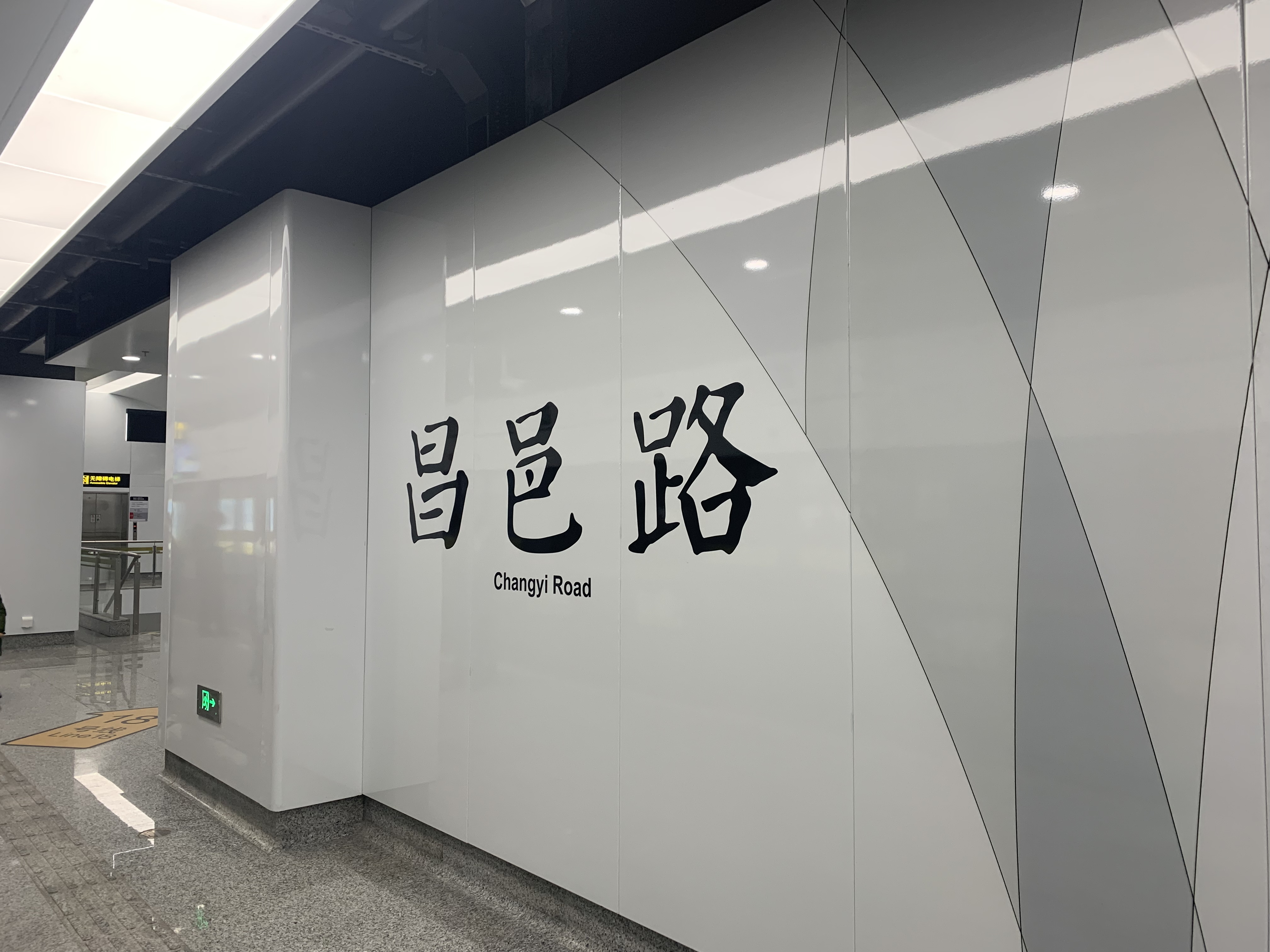
Station sign

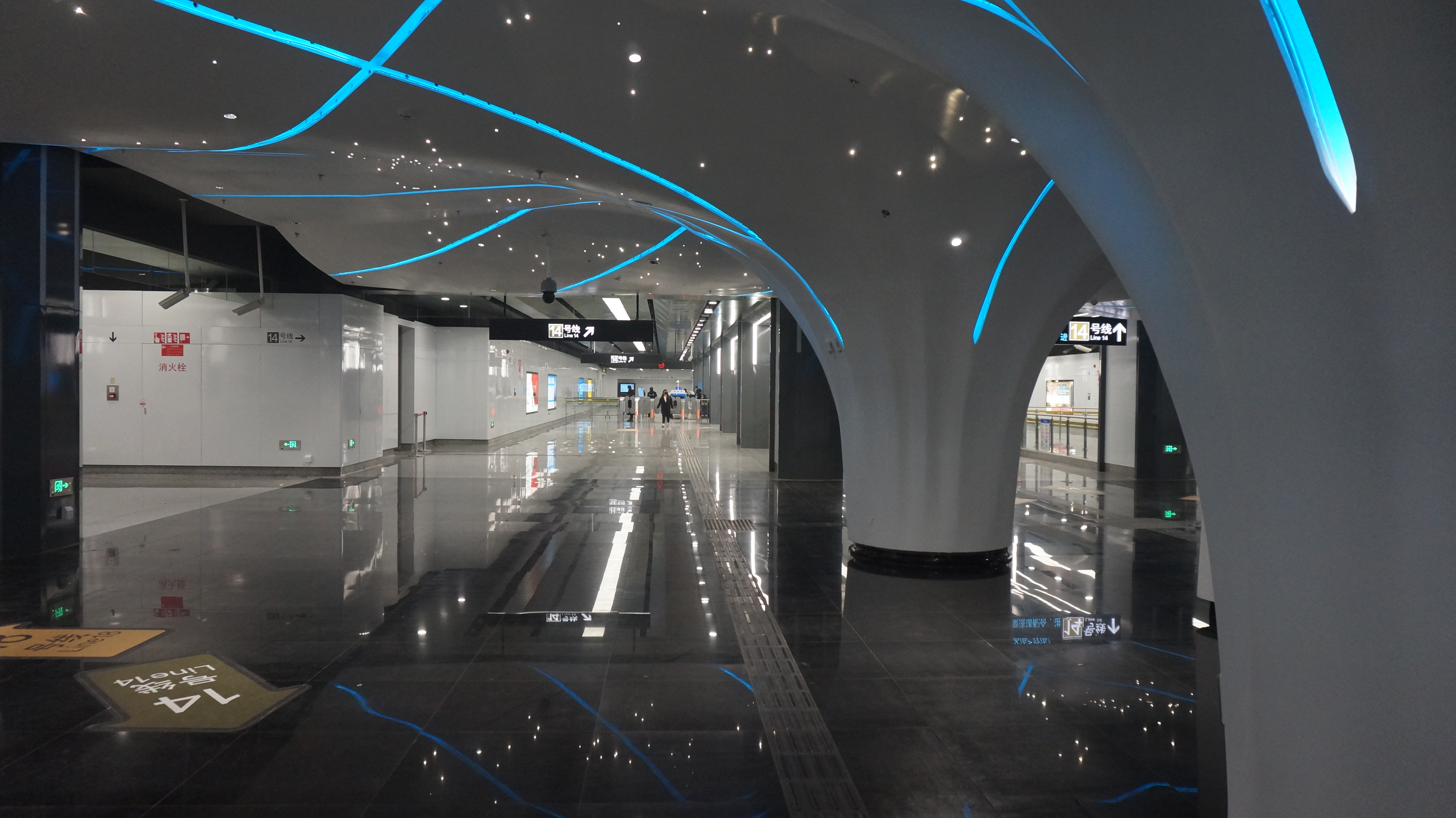
Station hall decoration

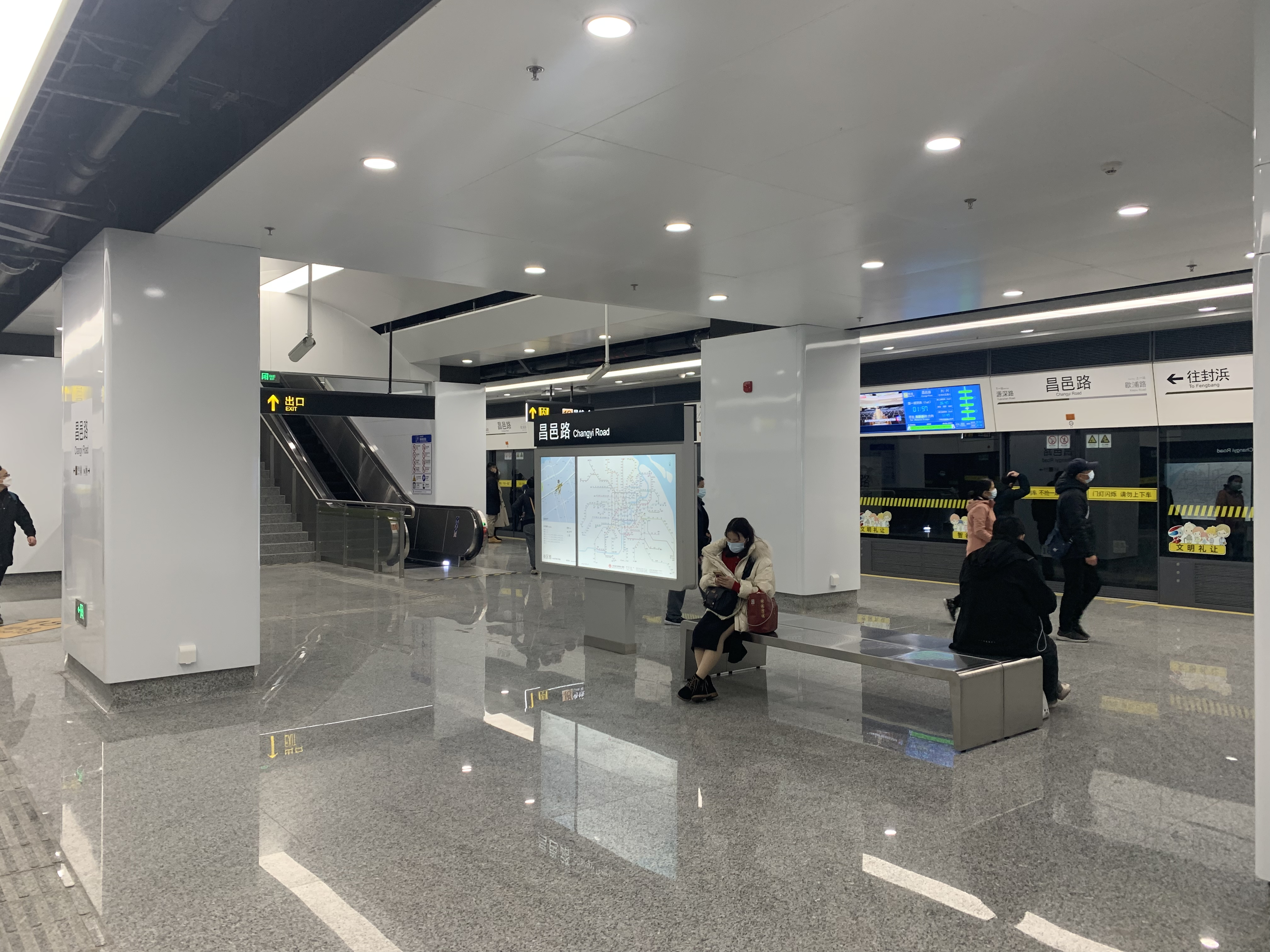
Line 14 platform

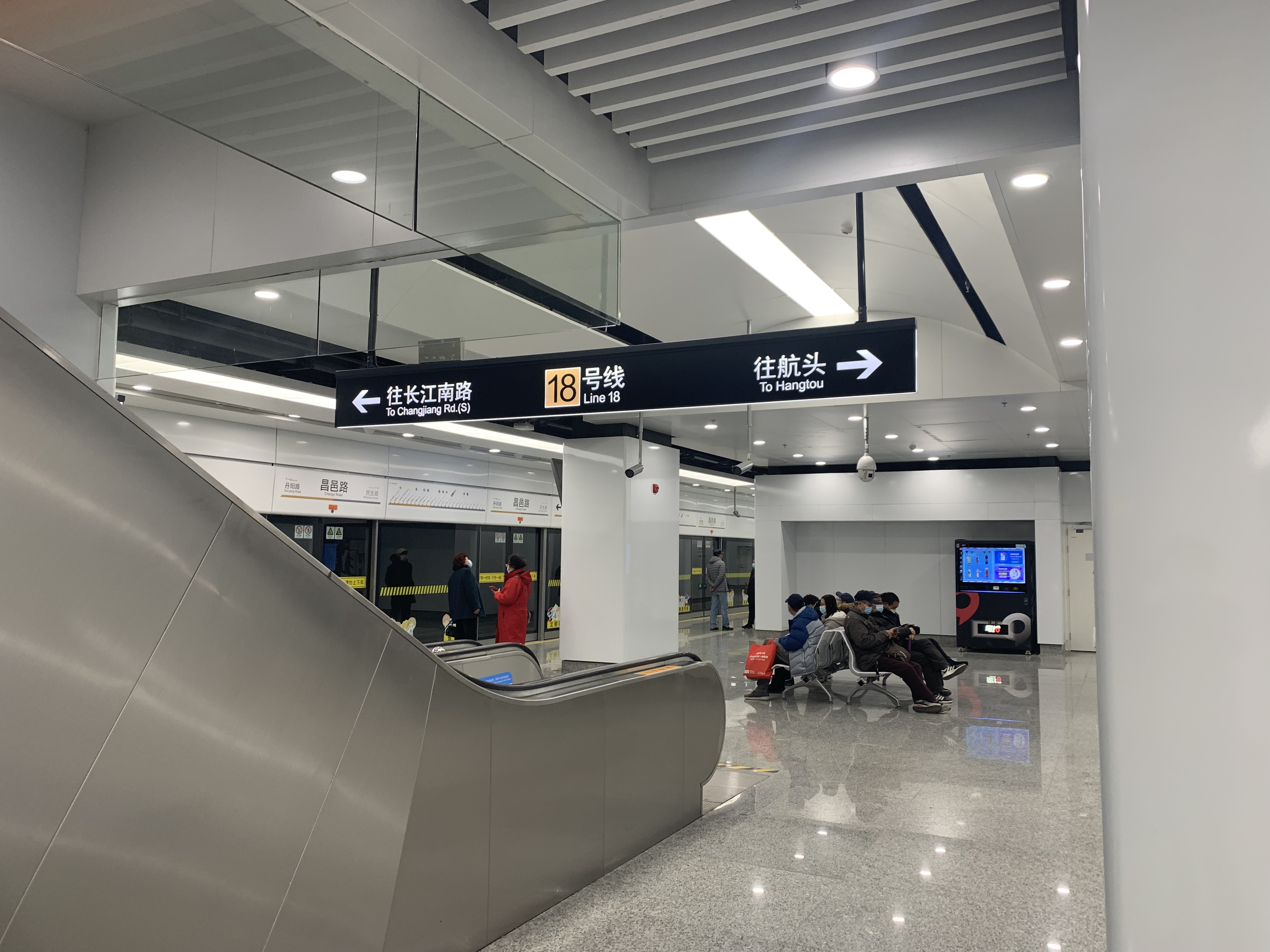
Line 18 platform

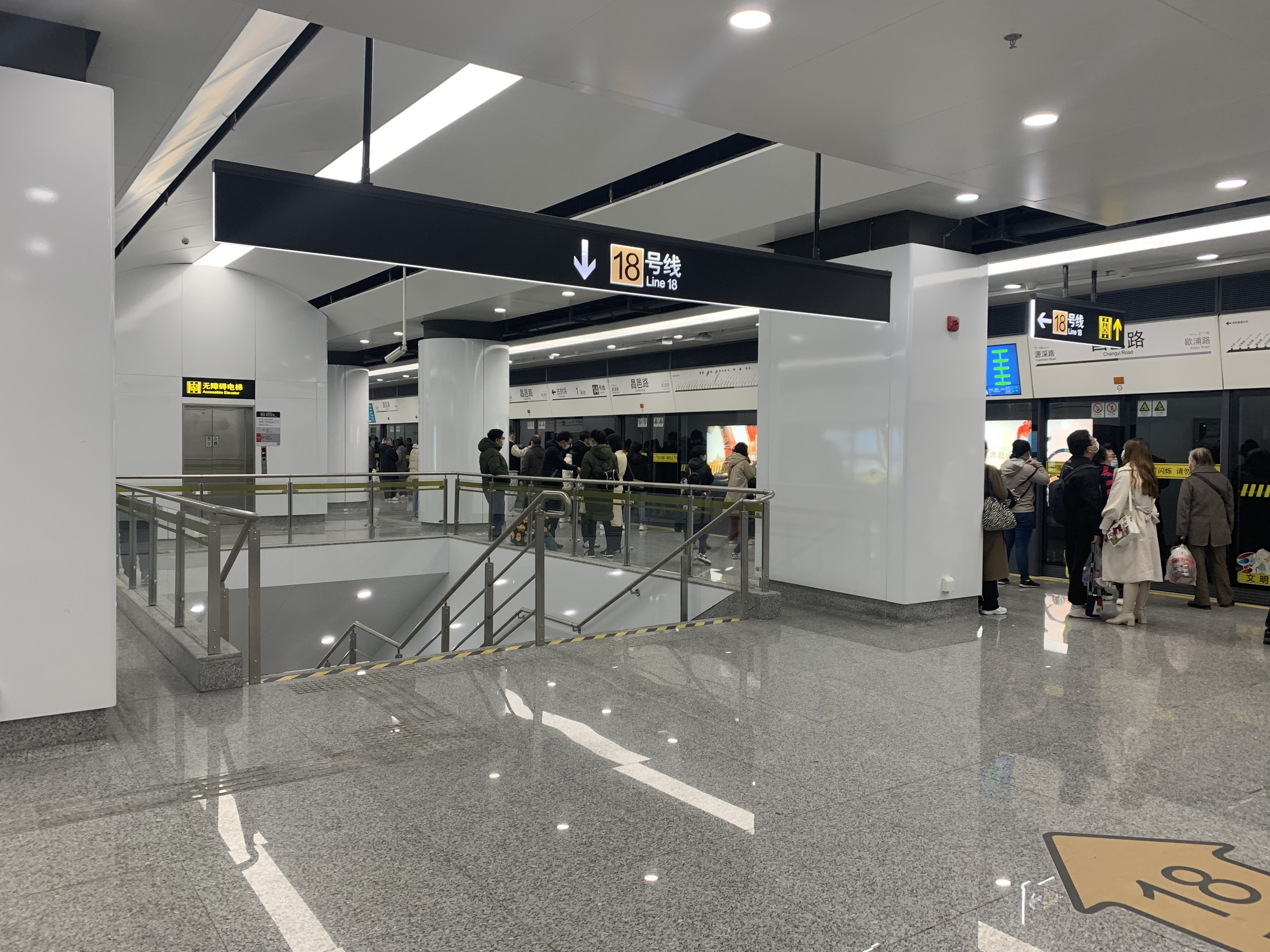
Line 14 transfer Node to Line 18
