= Dongfang Road =

Road in Shanghai, China

Dongfang Road or Dongfang Lu (pinyin: Dōngfāng Lù) is a major road in the Pudong New District of Shanghai.

Dongfang Road was formerly known as Wendeng Road which was named after the Wendeng District of Shandong Province.

== History ==
Dongfang Road was first established in the late 1950s to accommodate the planning and construction of new residential areas nearby. The road was extended several times along with the urban development of Pudong. In 1994, the road was renamed to Dongfang Road from Wendeng Road after the establishment of Shanghai Oriental TV building.

== Transportation ==
=== Ferry ===
Qiqing Ferry is located at the north end of the road.

=== Metro ===
- Shanghai Metro Line 4: Dongfang Road, Pudong Avenue Station, Century Avenue Station.
- Shanghai Metro Line 6: lCentury Avenue Station, Pudian Road Station, Blue Village Road Station, Shanghai Children's Medical Center Station, Linyi Village Station.

== Major Landmarks ==
- Renji Hospital
- Shanghai Children's Medical Center
- Shijihui (under construction)
