= Xiangcheng Road station =

Shanghai Metro station

Xiangcheng Road 向城路
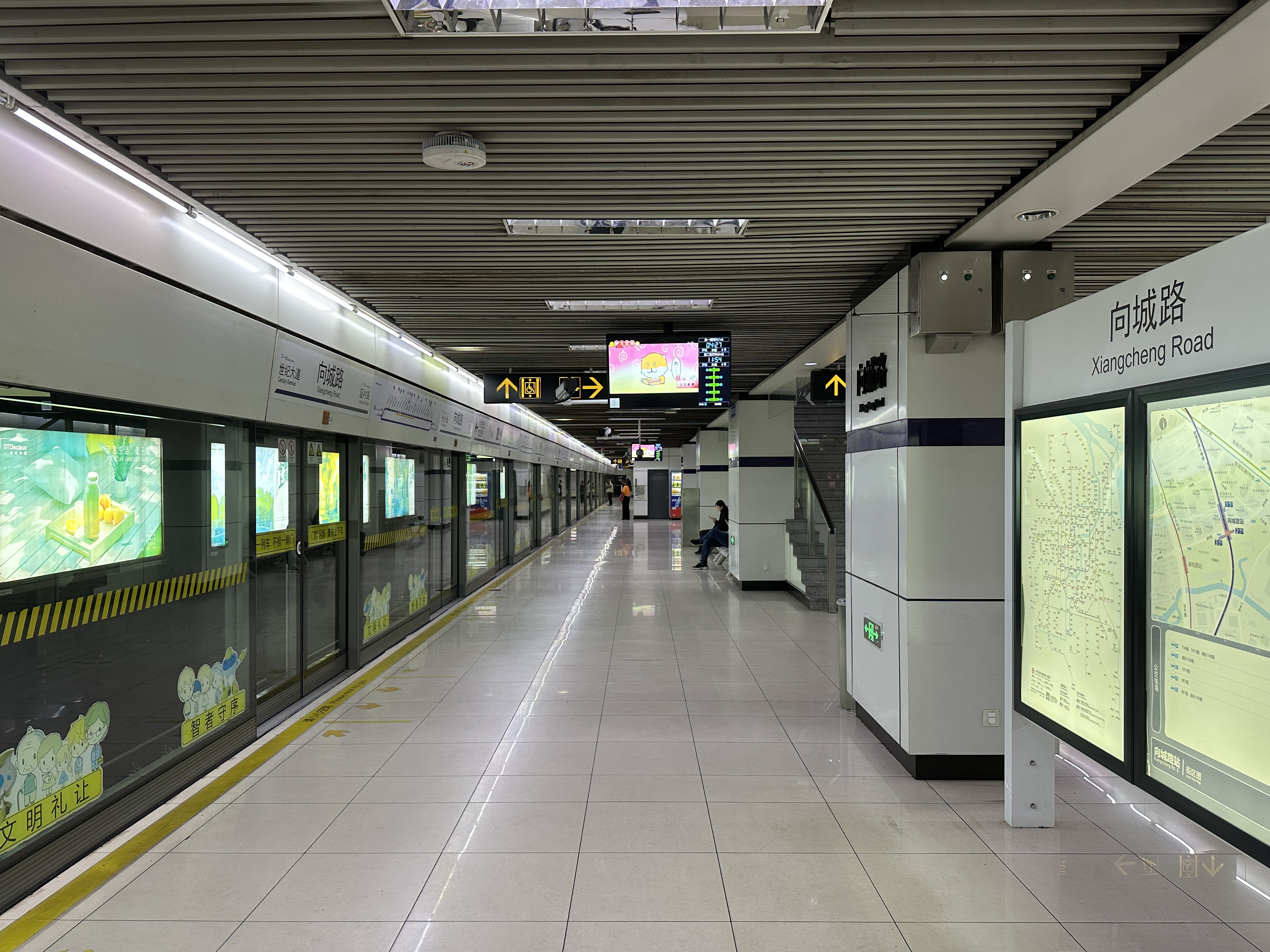
- Station platform

General information
- Other names: Pudian Road (before 21 September 2024)
- Location: Fushan Road (福山路) and Pudian Road; Pudong, Shanghai; China
- Coordinates: 31°13′20″N 121°31′55″E
- Line: Line 4
- Platforms: 2 (1 island platform)
- Tracks: 2

Construction
- Structure type: Underground
- Accessible: Yes

History
- Opened: 31 December 2005; 20 years ago

Services
Preceding station	Shanghai Metro	Following station
Lancun Road Clockwise	Line 4	Century Avenue Counter-clockwise
Location
- Location within Shanghai

Xiangcheng Road (Chinese: 向城路) is a station on Line 4 of the Shanghai Metro. Formerly named Pudian Road station, it was renamed on 21 September 2024. There is also another station named Pudian Road Station on Line 6, which used to have the same name as this station prior to the name change. While these two stations are situated relatively close to each other, the two stations are not interchangeable; they are located along different parts of Pudian Road.

Adjacent stations on both directions, Lancun Road station and Century Avenue station, can be used to interchange Line 6.

Service began at this station on 31 December 2005.

This station is also served by buses 169, 736, and 995.

This station has four exits.
