= Pudian Road station (line 6) =

Shanghai Metro station

Pudian Road 浦电路
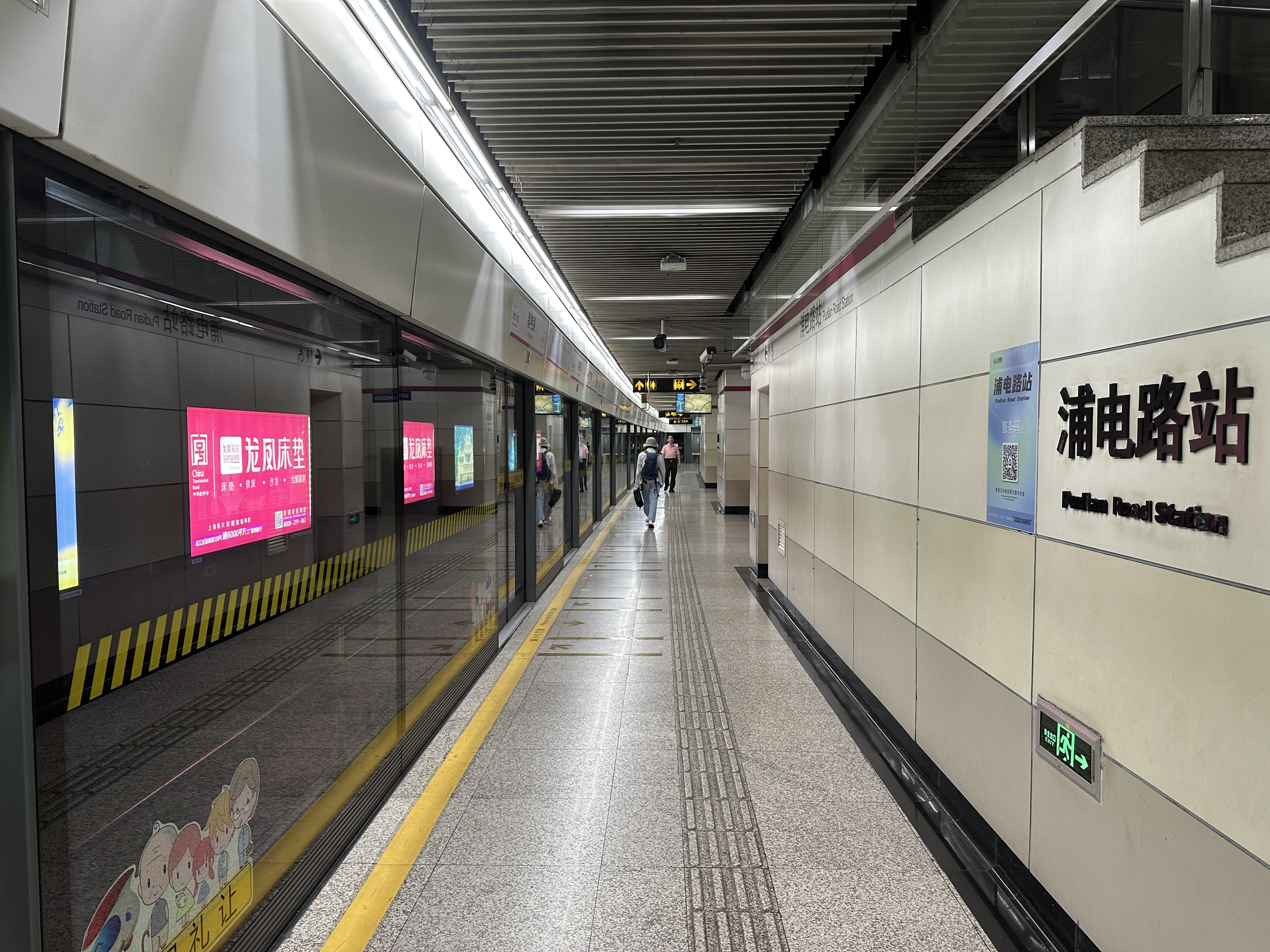
- Station platform

General information
- Location: Dongfang Road at Pudian Road, Pudong, Shanghai; China
- Coordinates: 31.2244°N 121.528°E
- Line: Line 6
- Platforms: 2 (1 island platform)
- Tracks: 2

Construction
- Structure type: Underground
- Accessible: Yes

History
- Opened: 29 December 2007; 18 years ago

Services
Preceding station	Shanghai Metro	Following station
Century Avenue towards Gangcheng Road	Line 6	Lancun Road towards Oriental Sports Center
Location
- Location within Shanghai

Pudian Road (simplified Chinese: 浦电路; traditional Chinese: 浦電路; pinyin: Pǔdiàn Lù) is the name of a station on Line 6 of the Shanghai Metro. There was also another station named Pudian Road on Line 4, however it was renamed Xiangcheng Road station on 21 September 2024. While these two stations are situated relatively close to each other, the two stations are not interchangeable; they are located along different parts of Pudian Road.

== Bus interchange ==
169, 170, 219, 522, 583, 639, 736, 746, 779, 785, 819, 871, 970, 978, 989, No.9 Tunnel Line, Dongchuan Line, 338, 451, 792, 795, 798, Night Tunnel Line

== Exit ==
There are three exits.
