= Qilianshan Road station =

Shanghai Metro station

Qilianshan Road 祁连山路
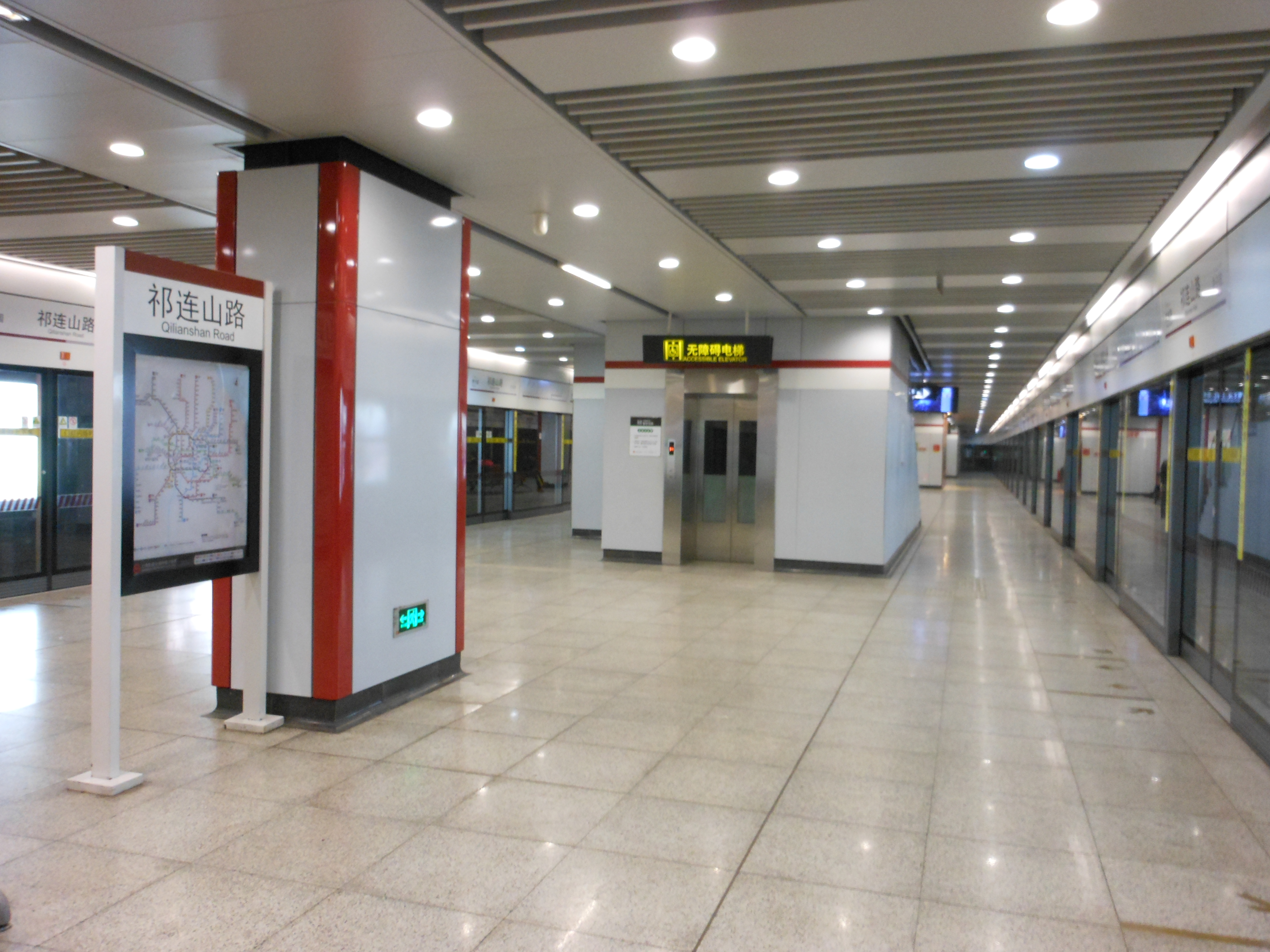
- Station platform

General information
- Location: Zhennan Road (真南路) and Qilianshan Road (祁连山路); Taopu, Putuo District, Shanghai; China
- Coordinates: 31°16′18″N 121°22′34″E
- Operator: Shanghai No. 2 Metro Operation Co. Ltd.
- Line: Line 11
- Platforms: 2 (1 island platform)
- Tracks: 2

Construction
- Structure type: Underground
- Accessible: Yes

History
- Opened: 31 December 2009

Services
Preceding station	Shanghai Metro	Following station
Wuwei Road towards North Jiading or Huaqiao	Line 11	Liziyuan towards Disney Resort
Location
- Location within Shanghai

Qilianshan Road (simplified Chinese: 祁连山路; traditional Chinese: 祁連山路; pinyin: Qíliánshān Lù) is a station on Line 11 of the Shanghai Metro. It opened on 31 December 2009.
