= Malu station =

Shanghai Metro station

Malu 马陆
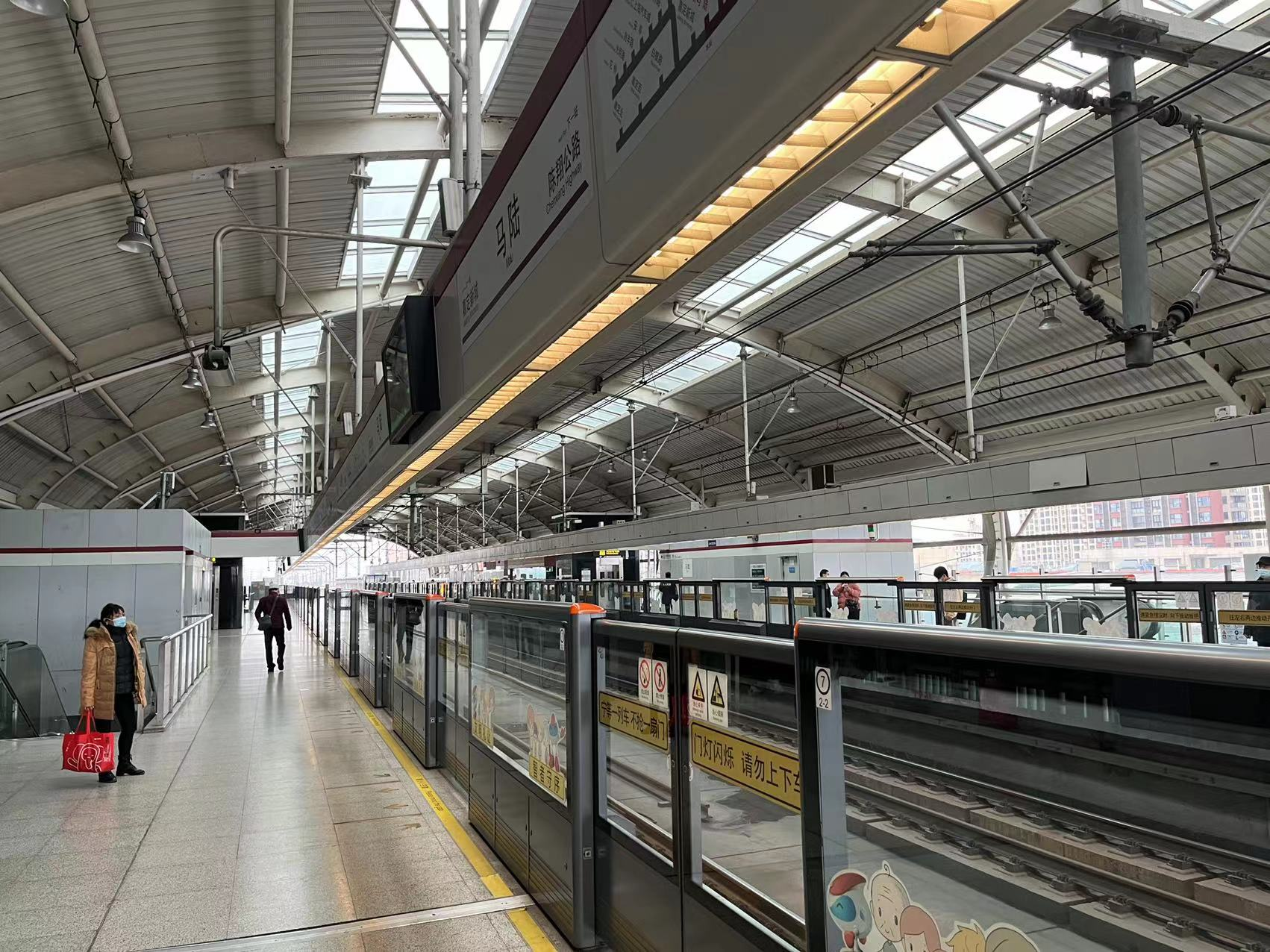
- Station platform

General information
- Location: Malu, Jiading District, Shanghai; China
- Coordinates: 31°19′11″N 121°16′37″E
- Operator: Shanghai No. 2 Metro Operation Co. Ltd.
- Line: Line 11
- Platforms: 2 (2 side platforms)
- Tracks: 2

Construction
- Structure type: Elevated
- Accessible: Yes

History
- Opened: 31 December 2009

Services
| Preceding station | Shanghai Metro | Following station |
|---|---|---|
| Jiading Xincheng towards North Jiading or Huaqiao | Line 11 | Chenxiang Highway towards Disney Resort |
Location
- Location within Shanghai

Malu (simplified Chinese: 马陆; traditional Chinese: 馬陸; pinyin: Mǎlù) is a station on Line 11 of the Shanghai Metro. It opened on 31 December 2009.
