= Sanlin station =

Shanghai Metro station

Sanlin 三林
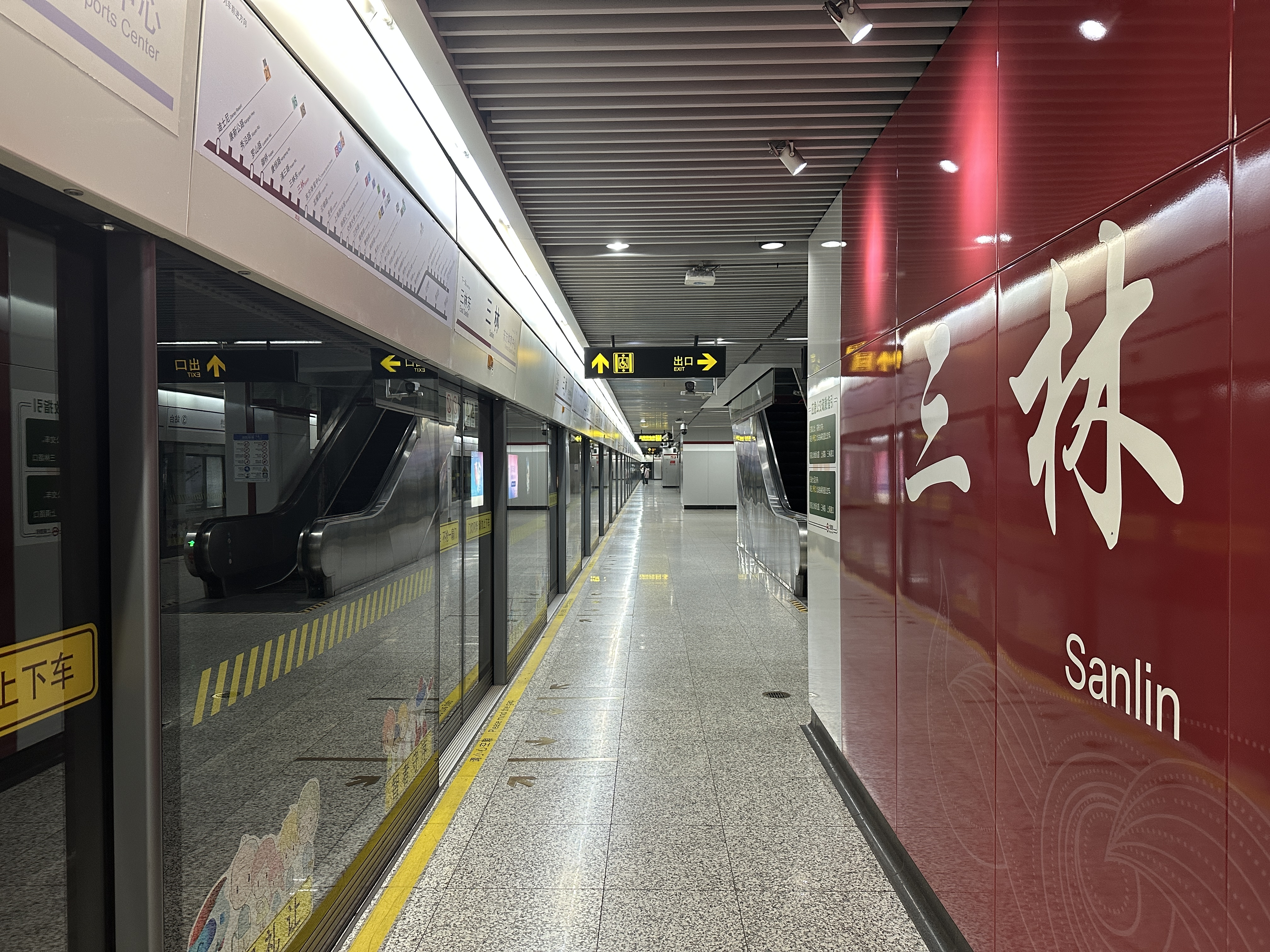
- Station platform

General information
- Location: Shangnan Road and Sanlin Road (三林路); Sanlin, Pudong, Shanghai; China
- Coordinates: 31.1454°N 121.5079°E
- Operator: Shanghai No. 2 Metro Operation Co. Ltd.
- Line: Line 11
- Platforms: 4 (2 island platforms)
- Tracks: 3

Construction
- Structure type: Underground
- Accessible: Yes

History
- Opened: 31 August 2013

Services
Preceding station	Shanghai Metro	Following station
Oriental Sports Center towards North Jiading or Huaqiao	Line 11	East Sanlin towards Disney Resort
Track layout
Location
- Location within Shanghai

Sanlin (Chinese: 三林; pinyin: Sānlín) is a station on Line 11 of the Shanghai Metro. It opened on 31 August 2013.

The station is located on the intersection of Sanlin Road and Shangnan Road in Sanlin Town, Pudong, Shanghai.

The station has four platforms with three tracks. Trains usually stop on the two outer tracks of the station. The middle track is mainly used to terminate trains from Huaqiao during peak hours.
