= Liziyuan station =

Shanghai Metro station

Liziyuan 李子园
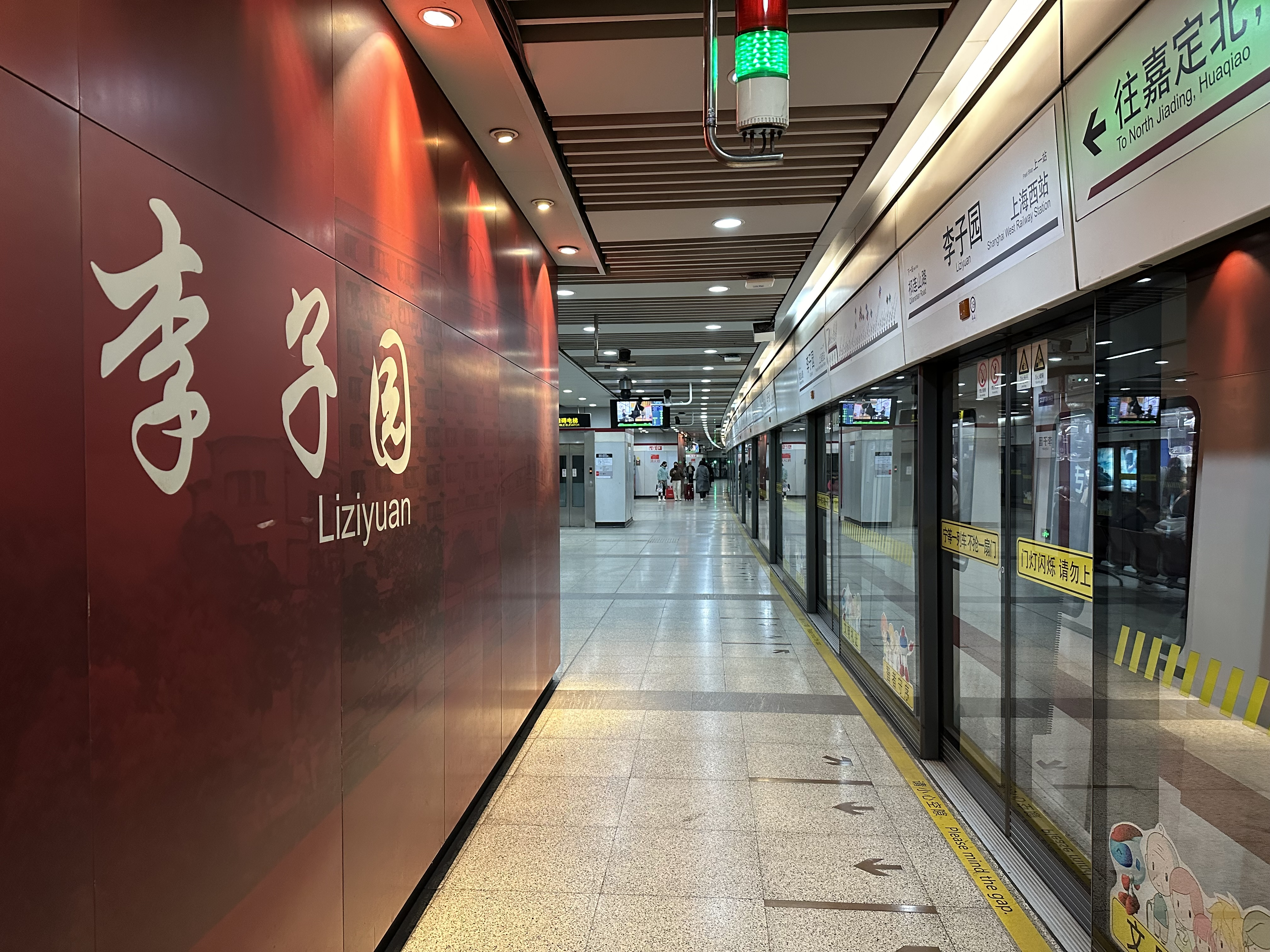
- Station platform

General information
- Location: Zhennan Road (真南路); Zhenruzhen Subdistrict, Putuo District, Shanghai; China
- Coordinates: 31°16′08″N 121°23′24″E
- Operator: Shanghai No. 2 Metro Operation Co. Ltd.
- Line: Line 11
- Platforms: 2 (1 island platform)
- Tracks: 2

Construction
- Structure type: Underground
- Accessible: Yes

History
- Opened: 31 December 2009

Services
Preceding station	Shanghai Metro	Following station
Qilianshan Road towards North Jiading or Huaqiao	Line 11	Shanghai West Railway Station towards Disney Resort
Location
- Location within Shanghai

Liziyuan (simplified Chinese: 李子园; traditional Chinese: 李子園; pinyin: Lǐzǐyuán) is a station on Line 11 of the Shanghai Metro. It opened on 31 December 2009.
