= Nanxiang station (Shanghai Metro) =

Shanghai Metro station

Nanxiang 南翔
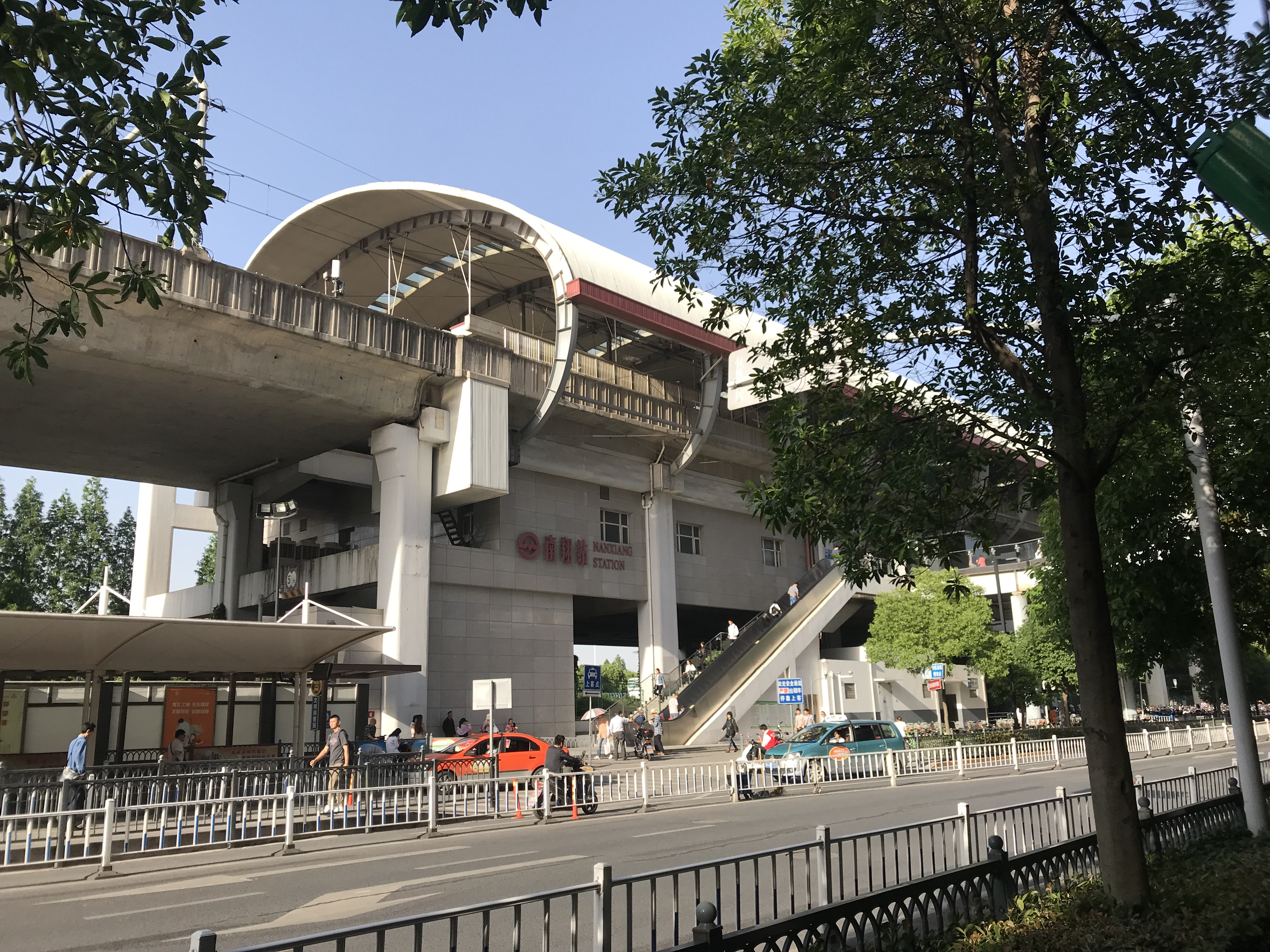
- Station exterior

General information
- Location: Nanxiang, Jiading District, Shanghai; China
- Coordinates: 31°17′49″N 121°19′23″E
- Operator: Shanghai No. 2 Metro Operation Co. Ltd.
- Line: Line 11
- Platforms: 3 (1 island platform and 1 side platform)
- Tracks: 3

Construction
- Structure type: Elevated
- Accessible: Yes

History
- Opened: 31 December 2009

Services
Preceding station	Shanghai Metro	Following station
Chenxiang Highway towards North Jiading or Huaqiao	Line 11	Taopu Xincun towards Disney Resort
Location
- Location within Shanghai

Nanxiang (Chinese: 南翔; pinyin: Nánxiáng) is a station on Line 11 of the Shanghai Metro. It opened on 31 December 2009.

The station has three tracks, one island platform, and one side platform. The inner side of the island platform is not in service. Trains bound for either North Jiading or Huaqiao use the outer side of the island platform, while trains heading to Disney Resort use the side platform. This station shares the similar platform layout with Zhenru station, which is also located on Line 11.

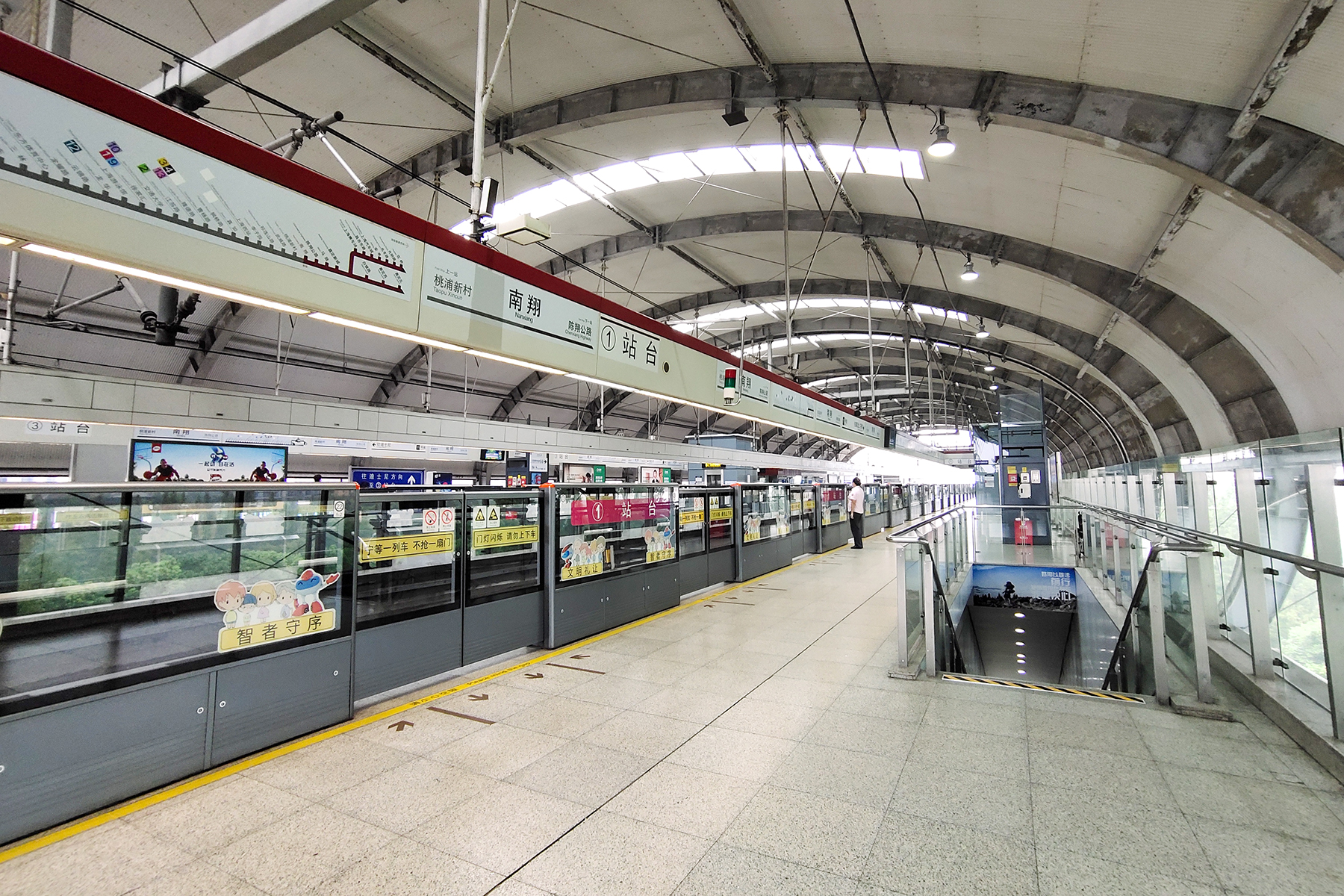
Northbound platform
