= Jiading Xincheng station =

Shanghai Metro station

Jiading Xincheng 嘉定新城
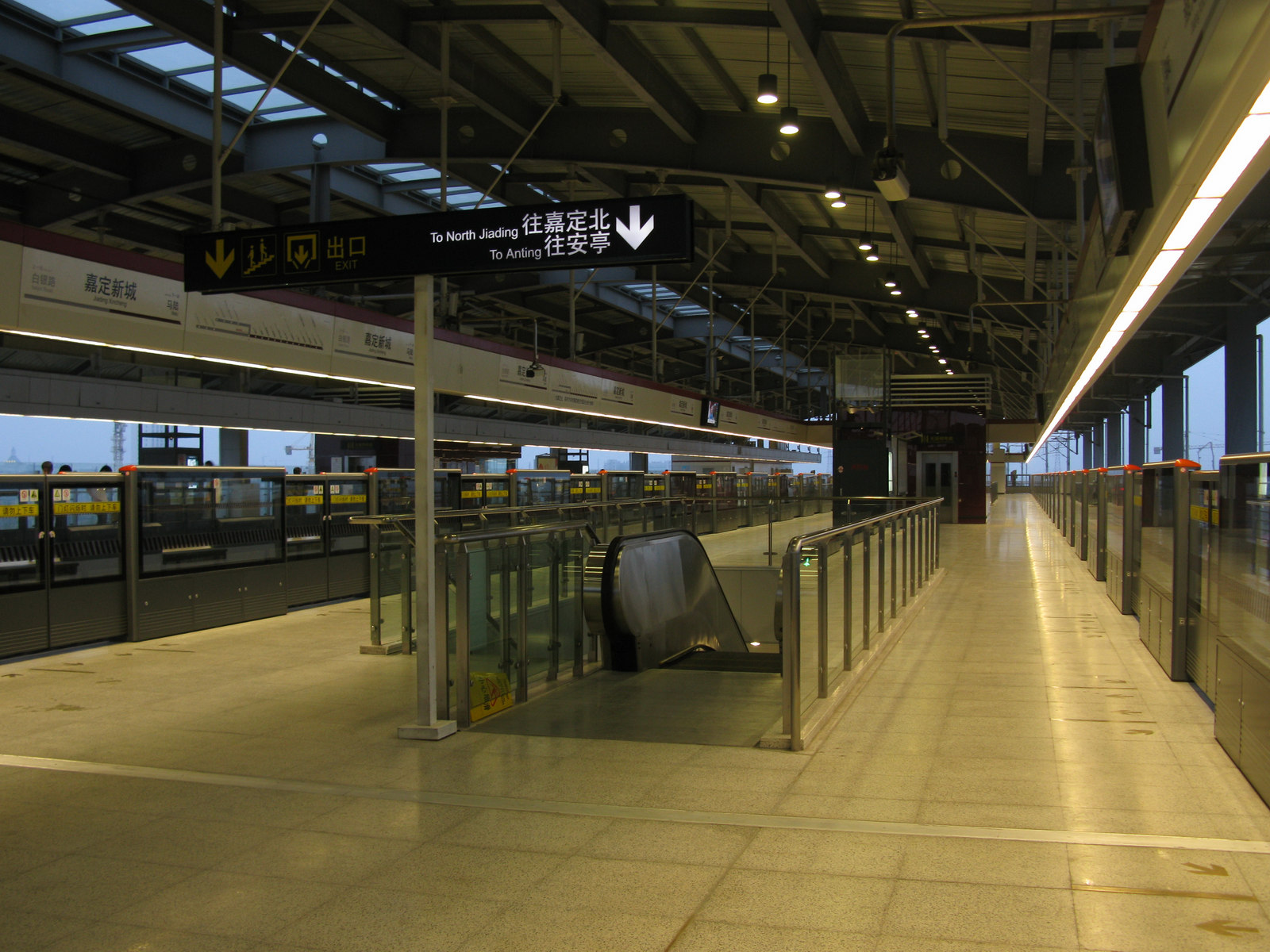
- Station platform

General information
- Location: Jiading District, Shanghai; China
- Coordinates: 31°19′51″N 121°15′15″E
- Operator: Shanghai No. 2 Metro Operation Co. Ltd.
- Line: Line 11
- Platforms: 3 (1 island platform and 1 side platform)
- Tracks: 3

Construction
- Structure type: Elevated
- Accessible: Yes

History
- Opened: 31 December 2009

Services
Preceding station	Shanghai Metro	Following station
Baiyin Road towards North Jiading	Line 11	Malu towards Disney Resort
Shanghai Circuit towards Huaqiao	Line 11 branch	Malu towards Disney Resort
Location
- Location within Shanghai

Jiading Xincheng (Chinese: 嘉定新城; pinyin: Jiādìng Xīnchéng) is a station on Line 11 of the Shanghai Metro. It was opened on 31 December 2009.

The station has one side platform and one island platform with three tracks. The side platform is for trains bound for North Jiading and Huaqiao on a single track; the island platform serves trains headed for Disney Resort on two tracks.
