= Chenxiang Highway station =

Shanghai Metro station

Chenxiang Highway 陈翔公路
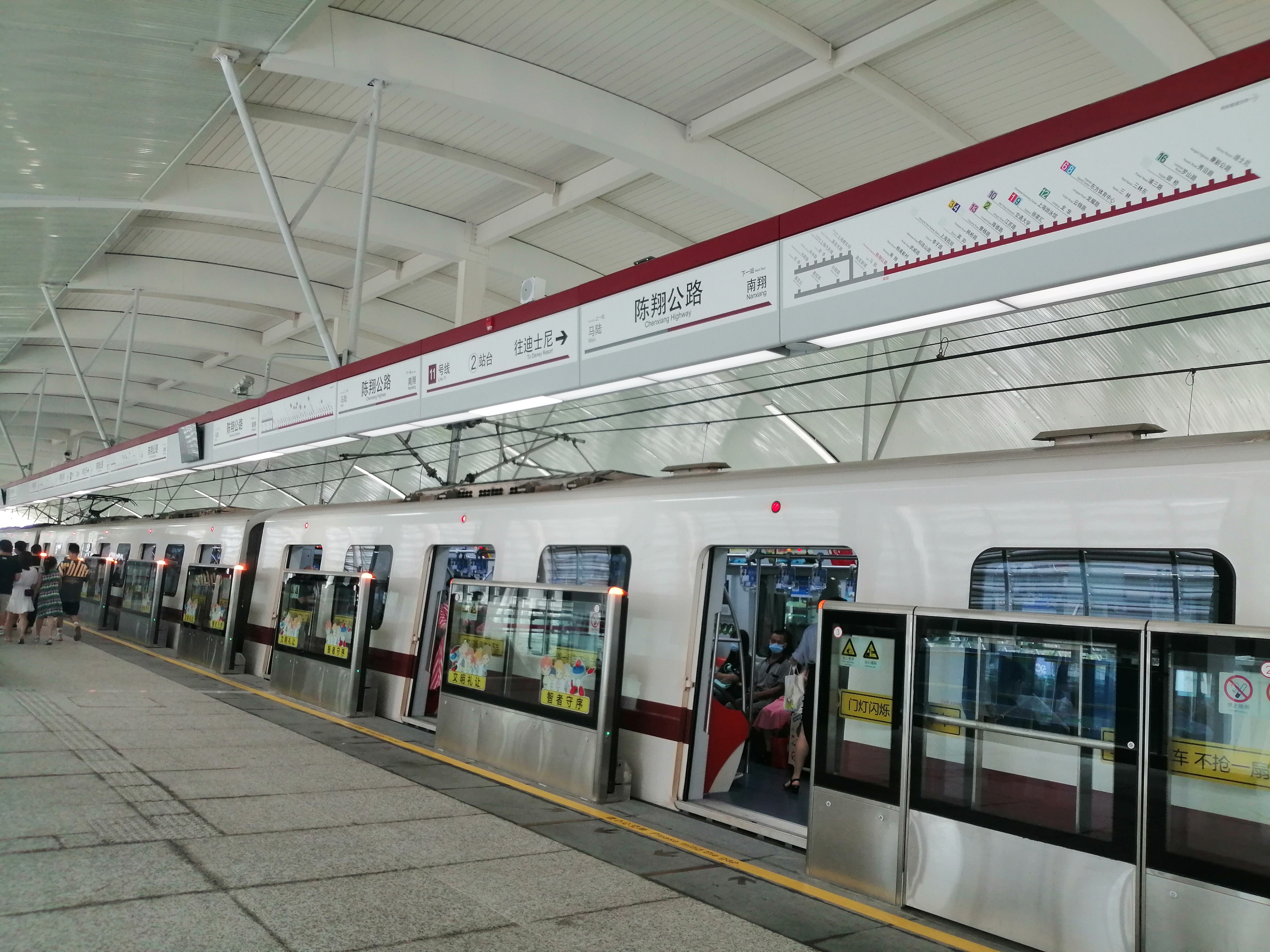
- Station platform with Disney Resort-bound train

General information
- Location: Chenxiang Road and S5 Shanghai–Jiading Expressway; Jiading District, Shanghai; China
- Coordinates: 31.308958°N 121.301917°E
- Operator: Shanghai No. 2 Metro Operation Co. Ltd.
- Line: Line 11
- Platforms: 2 (2 side platforms)
- Tracks: 2

Construction
- Structure type: Elevated
- Accessible: Yes

History
- Opened: 25 August 2020

Services
Preceding station	Shanghai Metro	Following station
Malu towards North Jiading or Huaqiao	Line 11	Nanxiang towards Disney Resort
Location

Chenxiang Highway (simplified Chinese: 陈翔公路; traditional Chinese: 陳翔公路; pinyin: Chénxiáng Gōnglù) is a station on Line 11 of the Shanghai Metro in Shanghai, located between Nanxiang and Malu stations in the city's suburban Jiading District. It was conceived to be included with the first phase of Line 11 as Universal Park Station, dependent on the expansion program of the adjacent Shanghai Universal (Note: No relation to Universal Studios Hollywood.) theme park. However, with the uncertainly in the viability of the park expansion project, reservations were made in Line 11's alignment to allow for the station to be added at a later date as an infill station while the rest of the Phase 1 opened in 2009. Shanghai Universal closed in 2000 due to financial issues and low patronage, leaving the new infill station unnecessary. Planned redevelopment of the Shanghai Universal lands into dense residential and commercial properties reintroduced the need for a metro station to serve the area. The start of the infill station project was approved in 2014 now as Chenxiang Highway station. Construction of the station started in 2018 and it was opened on 25 August 2020.
