= Pusan Road station =

Shanghai Metro station

Pusan Road 浦三路
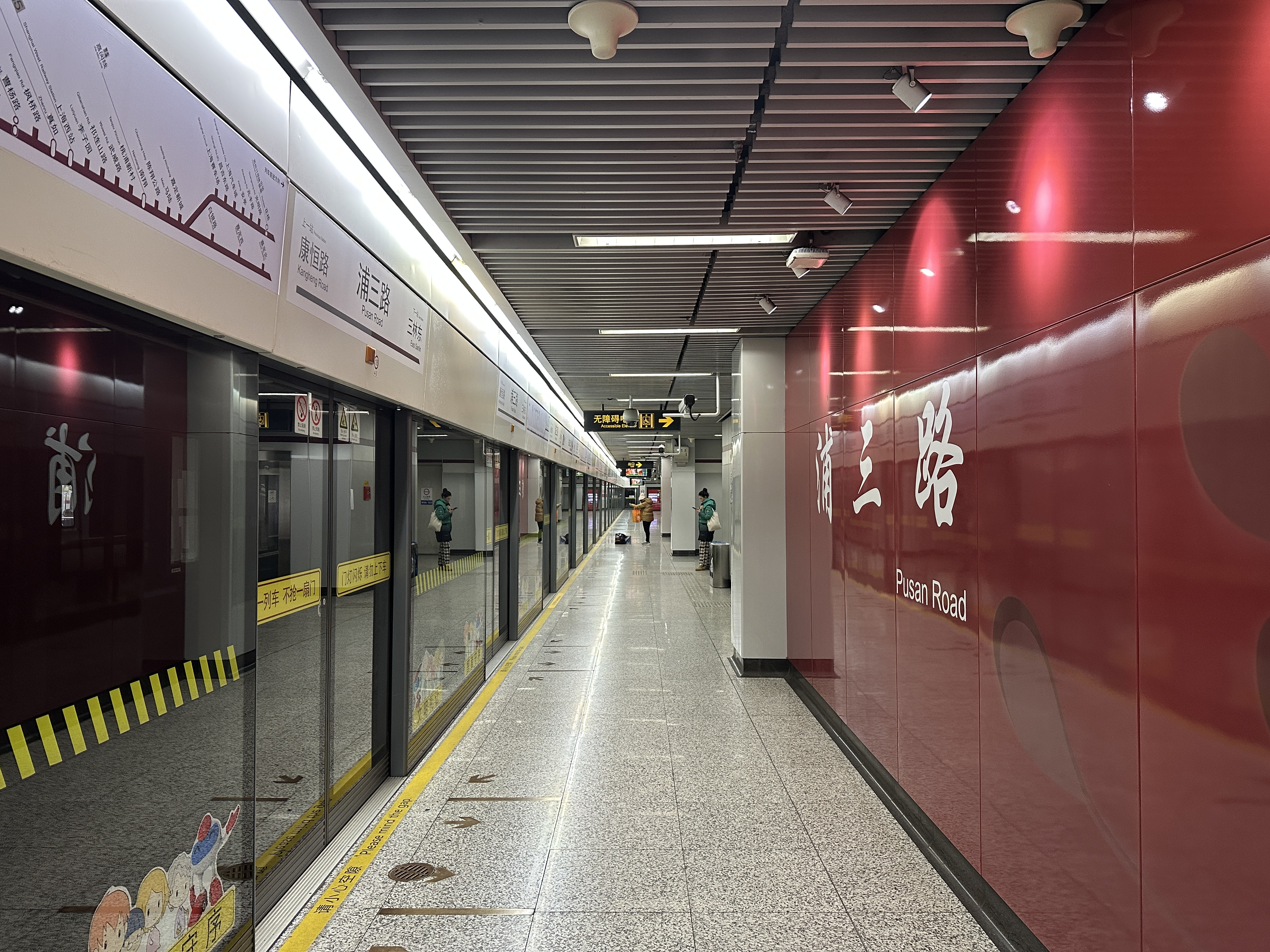
- Platform towards North Jiading or Huaqiao

General information
- Location: Yuqiao Road (御桥路) and Pusan Road (浦三路); Sanlin, Pudong, Shanghai; China
- Coordinates: 31.152943°N 121.534505°E
- Operator: Shanghai No. 2 Metro Operation Co. Ltd.
- Line: Line 11
- Platforms: 2 (2 side platforms)
- Tracks: 2

Construction
- Structure type: Underground
- Accessible: Yes

History
- Opened: August 31, 2013

Services
Preceding station	Shanghai Metro	Following station
East Sanlin towards North Jiading or Huaqiao	Line 11	Kangheng Road towards Disney Resort
Location
- Location within Shanghai

Pusan Road (Chinese: 浦三路; pinyin: Pǔsān Lù) is a station on Line 11 of the Shanghai Metro, which opened on August 31, 2013.
