= Wuwei Road station =

Shanghai Metro station

Wuwei Road 武威路
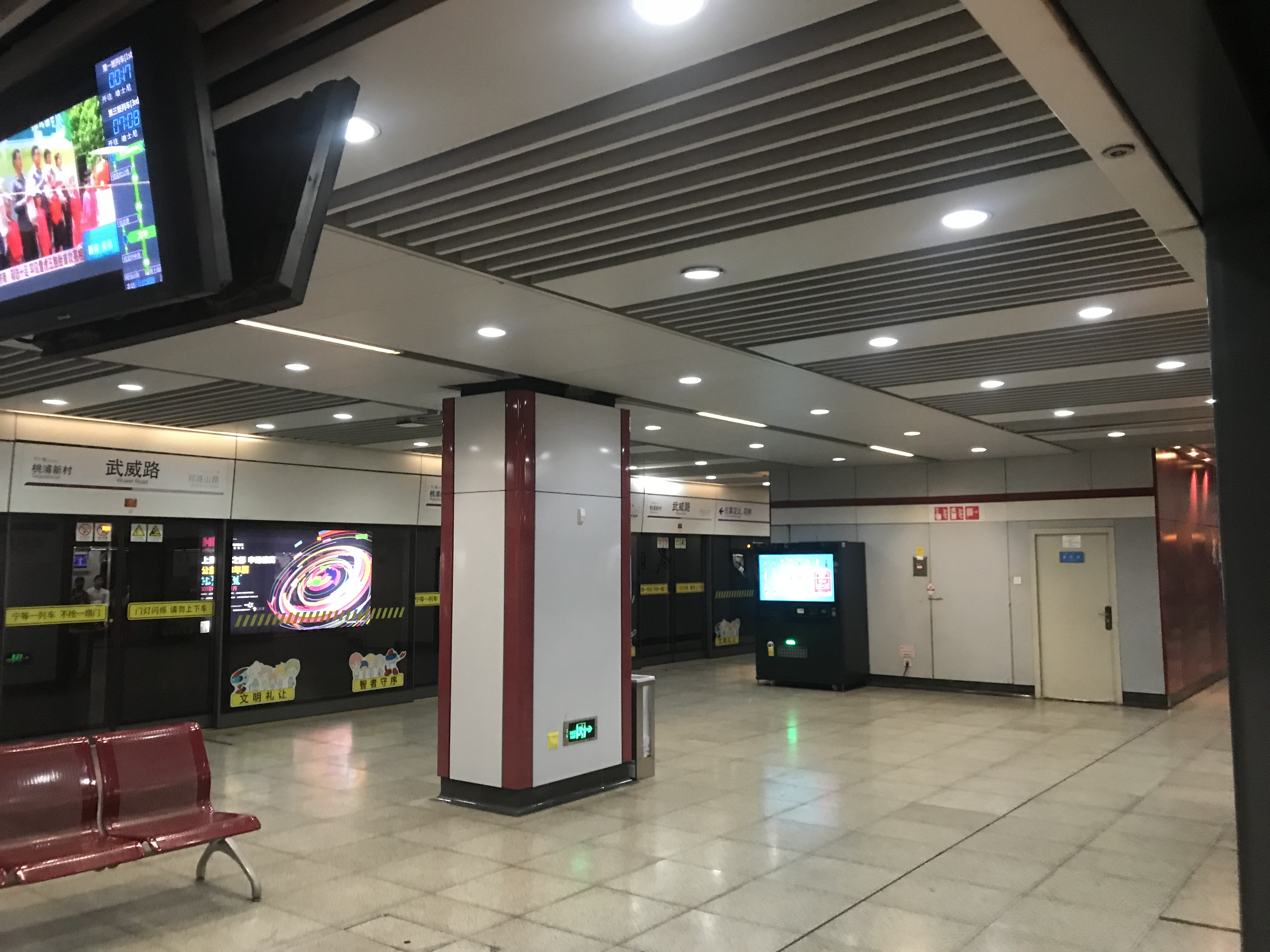
- Station platform

General information
- Location: Wuwei Road (武威路) and Zhennan Road (真南路); Taopu, Putuo District, Shanghai; China
- Coordinates: 31°16′36″N 121°21′53″E
- Operator: Shanghai No. 2 Metro Operation Co. Ltd.
- Line: Line 11
- Platforms: 2 (1 island platform)
- Tracks: 2

Construction
- Structure type: Underground
- Accessible: Yes

History
- Opened: 31 December 2009

Services
Preceding station	Shanghai Metro	Following station
Taopu Xincun towards North Jiading or Huaqiao	Line 11	Qilianshan Road towards Disney Resort
Location
- Location within Shanghai

Wuwei Road (Chinese: 武威路; pinyin: Wǔwēi Lù) is a station on Line 11 of the Shanghai Metro. It opened on 31 December 2009.
