= East Sanlin station =

Shanghai Metro station

East Sanlin 三林东
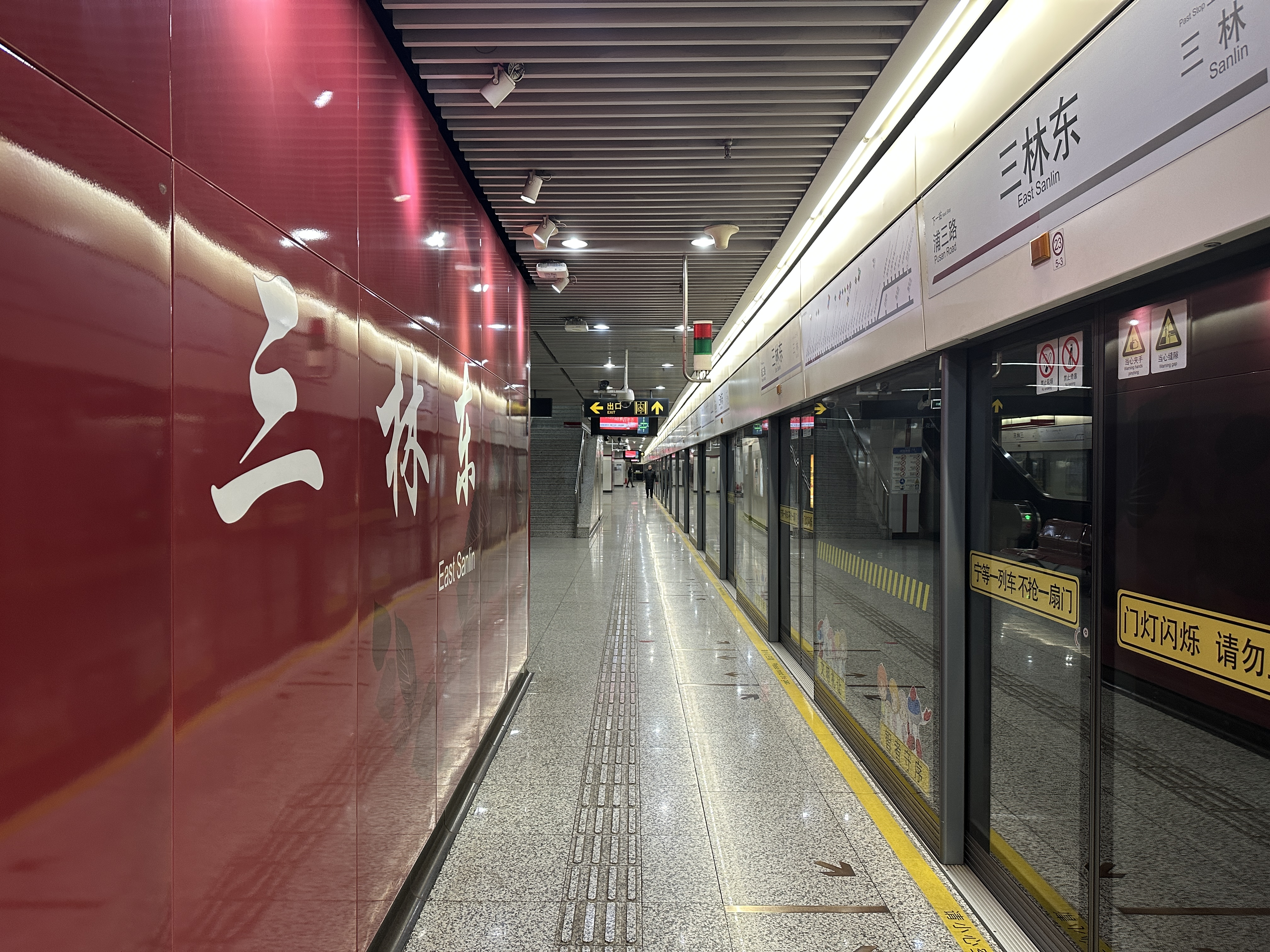
- Station platform

General information
- Location: Sanlin Road (三林路) and Dongming Road (东明路); Sanlin, Pudong, Shanghai
- Coordinates: 31.148615°N 121.51876°E
- Operator: Shanghai No. 2 Metro Operation Co. Ltd.
- Line: Line 11
- Platforms: 2 (1 island platform)
- Tracks: 2

Construction
- Structure type: Underground
- Accessible: Yes

History
- Opened: August 31, 2013

Services
Preceding station	Shanghai Metro	Following station
Sanlin towards North Jiading or Huaqiao	Line 11	Pusan Road towards Disney Resort
Location
- Location within Shanghai

East Sanlin (simplified Chinese: 三林东; traditional Chinese: 三林東; pinyin: Sānlín Dōng) is a station on Line 11 of the Shanghai Metro, which opened on August 31, 2013.
