= Baiyin Road station =

Shanghai Metro station

Baiyin Road 白银路
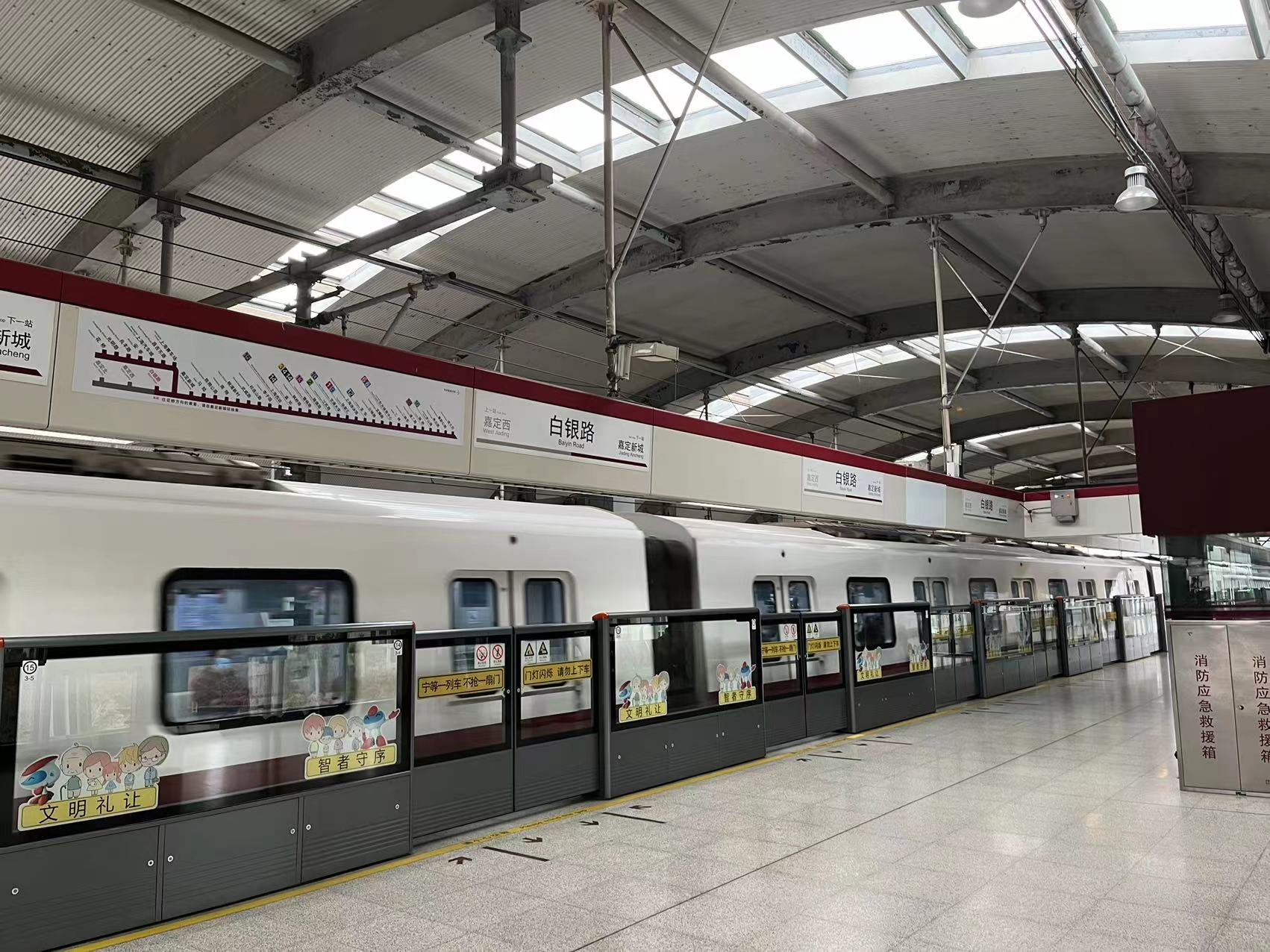

General information
- Location: Baiyin Road (白银路); Jiading District, Shanghai; China
- Coordinates: 31°20′49″N 121°14′26″E
- Operator: Shanghai No. 2 Metro Operation Co. Ltd.
- Line: Line 11
- Platforms: 2 (2 side platforms)
- Tracks: 2

Construction
- Structure type: Elevated
- Accessible: Yes

History
- Opened: 31 December 2009

Services
Preceding station	Shanghai Metro	Following station
West Jiading towards North Jiading	Line 11	Jiading Xincheng towards Disney Resort
Location
- Location within Shanghai

Baiyin Road (simplified Chinese: 白银路; traditional Chinese: 白銀路; pinyin: Báiyín Lù) is a station on Line 11 of the Shanghai Metro.
