= Shanghai Circuit station =

Shanghai Metro station

Shanghai Circuit 上海赛车场
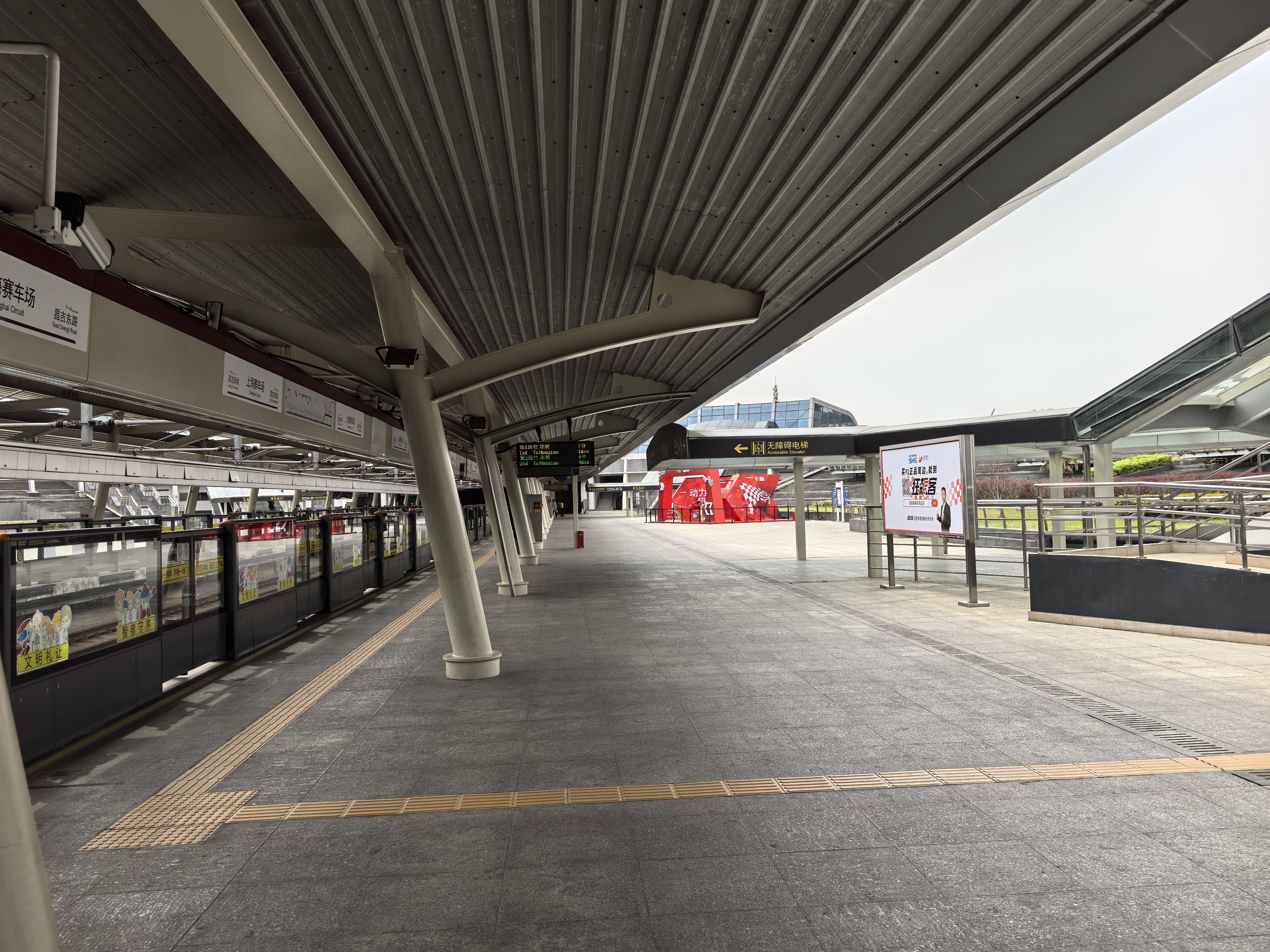
- Northbound platform

General information
- Location: Shanghai International Circuit; Jiading District, Shanghai; China
- Coordinates: 31°19′55″N 121°13′34″E
- Operator: Shanghai No. 2 Metro Operation Co. Ltd.
- Line: Line 11
- Platforms: 2 (2 side platforms)
- Tracks: 2

Construction
- Structure type: Open-cut
- Accessible: Yes

History
- Opened: 29 March 2010

Services
Preceding station	Shanghai Metro	Following station
East Changji Road towards Huaqiao	Line 11 branch	Jiading Xincheng towards Disney Resort
Location
- Location within Shanghai

Shanghai Circuit (simplified Chinese: 上海赛车场; traditional Chinese: 上海賽車場; pinyin: Shànghǎi Sàichēchǎng) is a station on Line 11 of the Shanghai Metro. It opened on 29 March 2010. The station is named after the nearby Shanghai International Circuit. This is the only open-cut station on Line 11.
