= Zhaofeng Road station =

Shanghai Metro station in Kunshan, Jiangsu

Zhaofeng Road 兆丰路
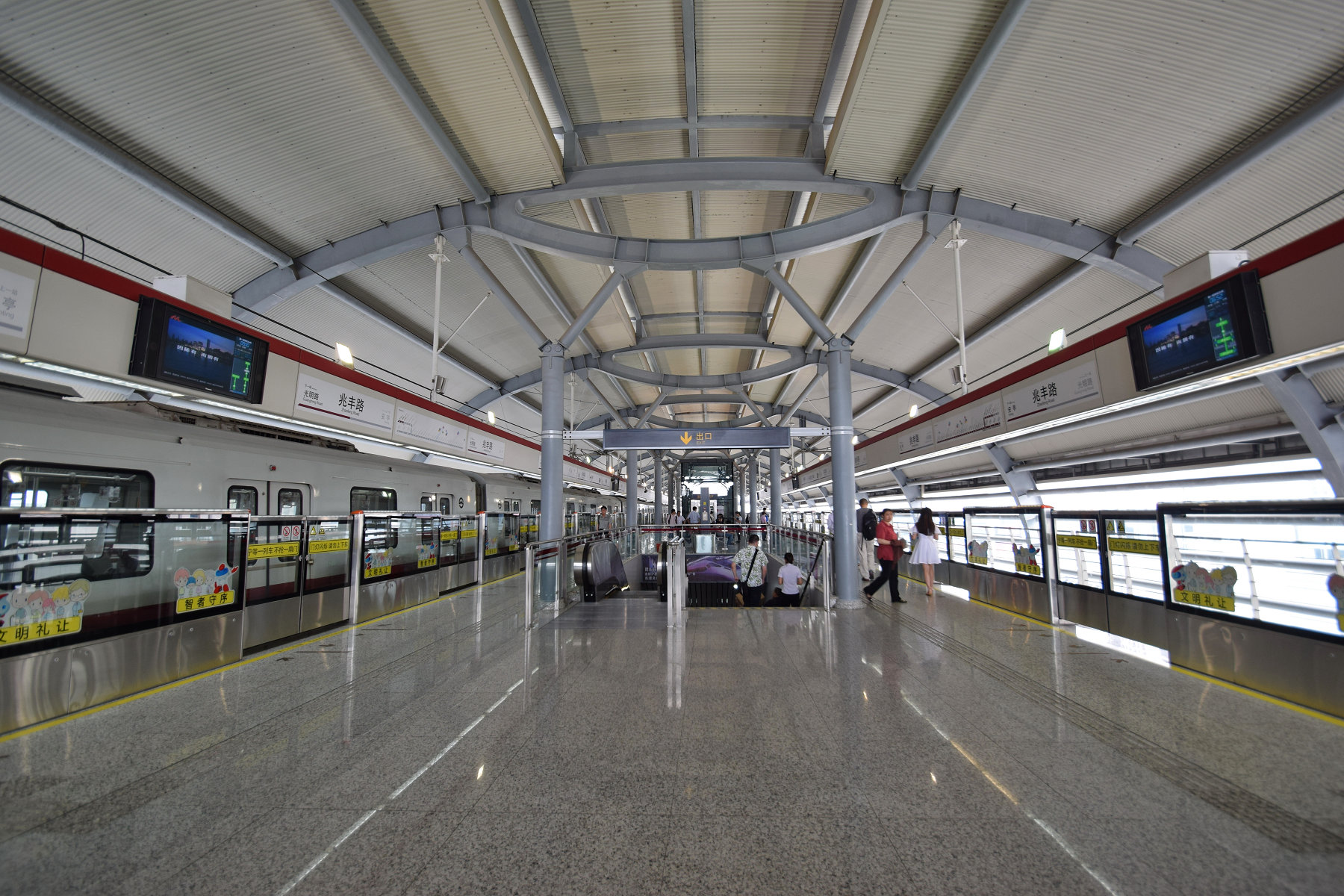
- Platform

General information
- Location: Cao'an Highway; Kunshan, Jiangsu; China
- Coordinates: 31.2909°N 121.1454°E
- Operated by: Shanghai No. 2 Metro Operation Co. Ltd.
- Line: Line 11
- Platforms: 2 (1 island platform)
- Tracks: 2

Construction
- Structure type: Elevated
- Accessible: Yes

History
- Opened: 16 October 2013

Services
Preceding station	Shanghai Metro	Following station
Guangming Road towards Huaqiao	Line 11 branch	Anting towards Disney Resort
Location

Zhaofeng Road (simplified Chinese: 兆丰路; traditional Chinese: 兆豐路; pinyin: Zhàofēng Lù) is a station on the branch line of Line 11 of the Shanghai Metro. It is located in Huaqiao, Kunshan, Jiangsu. It is also one of three stations in the Shanghai Metro system that is not located in the municipality of Shanghai itself.

== History ==
The station opened on 16 October 2013.

From 26 January 2020 to 24 March 2020, services on a segment of Line 11 between Huaqiao and Anting stations were suspended due to the COVID-19 pandemic.
