= West Jiading station =

Shanghai Metro station

West Jiading 嘉定西
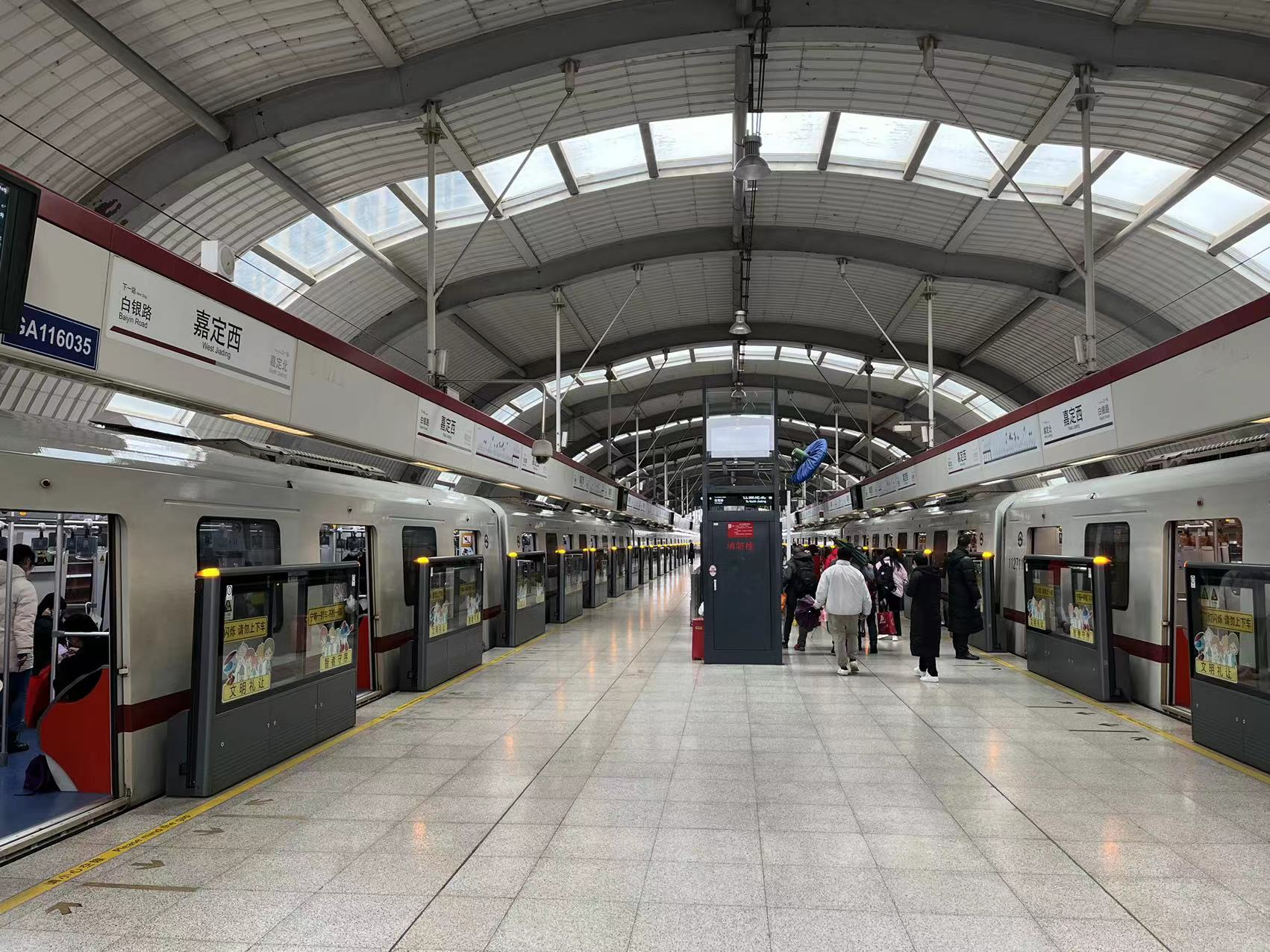

General information
- Location: Jiading District, Shanghai; China
- Coordinates: 31°22′44″N 121°13′23″E
- Operator: Shanghai No. 2 Metro Operation Co. Ltd.
- Line: Line 11
- Platforms: 2 (1 island platform)
- Tracks: 2

Construction
- Structure type: Elevated
- Accessible: Yes

History
- Opened: 31 December 2009

Services
Preceding station	Shanghai Metro	Following station
North Jiading Terminus	Line 11	Baiyin Road towards Disney Resort
Location
- Location within Shanghai

West Jiading (Chinese: 嘉定西; pinyin: Jiādìng Xī) is a station on Line 11 of the Shanghai Metro.
