= Guangming Road station =

Shanghai Metro station in Kunshan, Jiangsu

Guangming Road 光明路
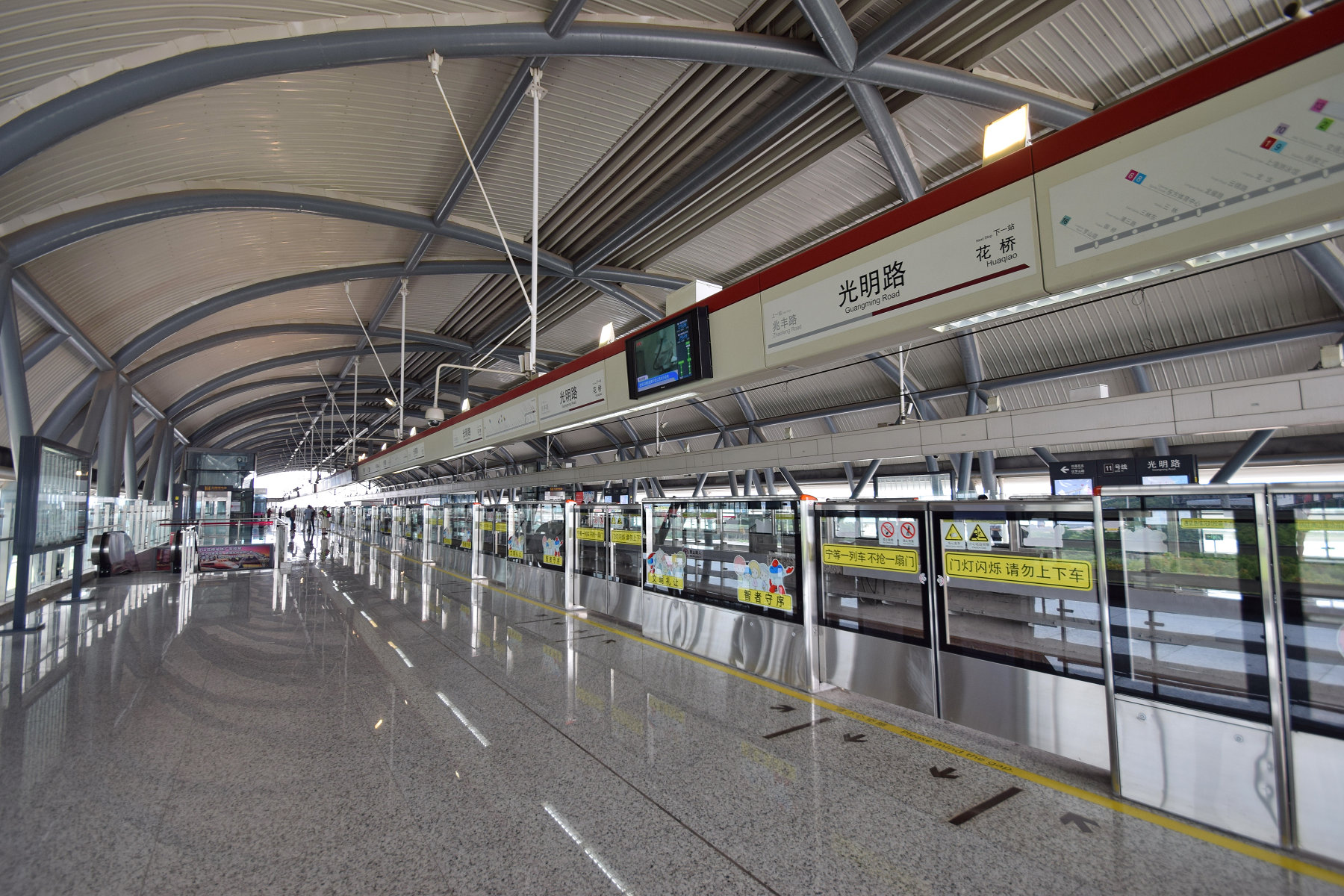
- Station platform, Huaqiao-bound side

General information
- Location: Guangming Road, Kunshan, Jiangsu; China
- Coordinates: 31.2981°N 121.1125°E
- Operated by: Shanghai No. 2 Metro Operation Co. Ltd.
- Line: Line 11
- Platforms: 2 (2 side platforms)
- Tracks: 2

Construction
- Structure type: Elevated
- Accessible: Yes

History
- Opened: 16 October 2013

Services
Preceding station	Shanghai Metro	Following station
Huaqiao Terminus	Line 11 branch	Zhaofeng Road towards Disney Resort
Location

Guangming Road (Chinese: 光明路; pinyin: Guāngmíng Lù) is a station on the branch line of Line 11 of the Shanghai Metro. It is located in Huaqiao, Kunshan, Jiangsu. It is also one of three stations in the Shanghai Metro system that is not located in the municipality of Shanghai itself.

== History ==
The station opened on 16 October 2013.

From 26 January 2020 to 24 March 2020, services on a segment of Line 11 between Huaqiao and Anting stations were suspended due to the COVID-19 pandemic.
