= Line 11 (Shanghai Metro) =

Line of Shanghai Metro

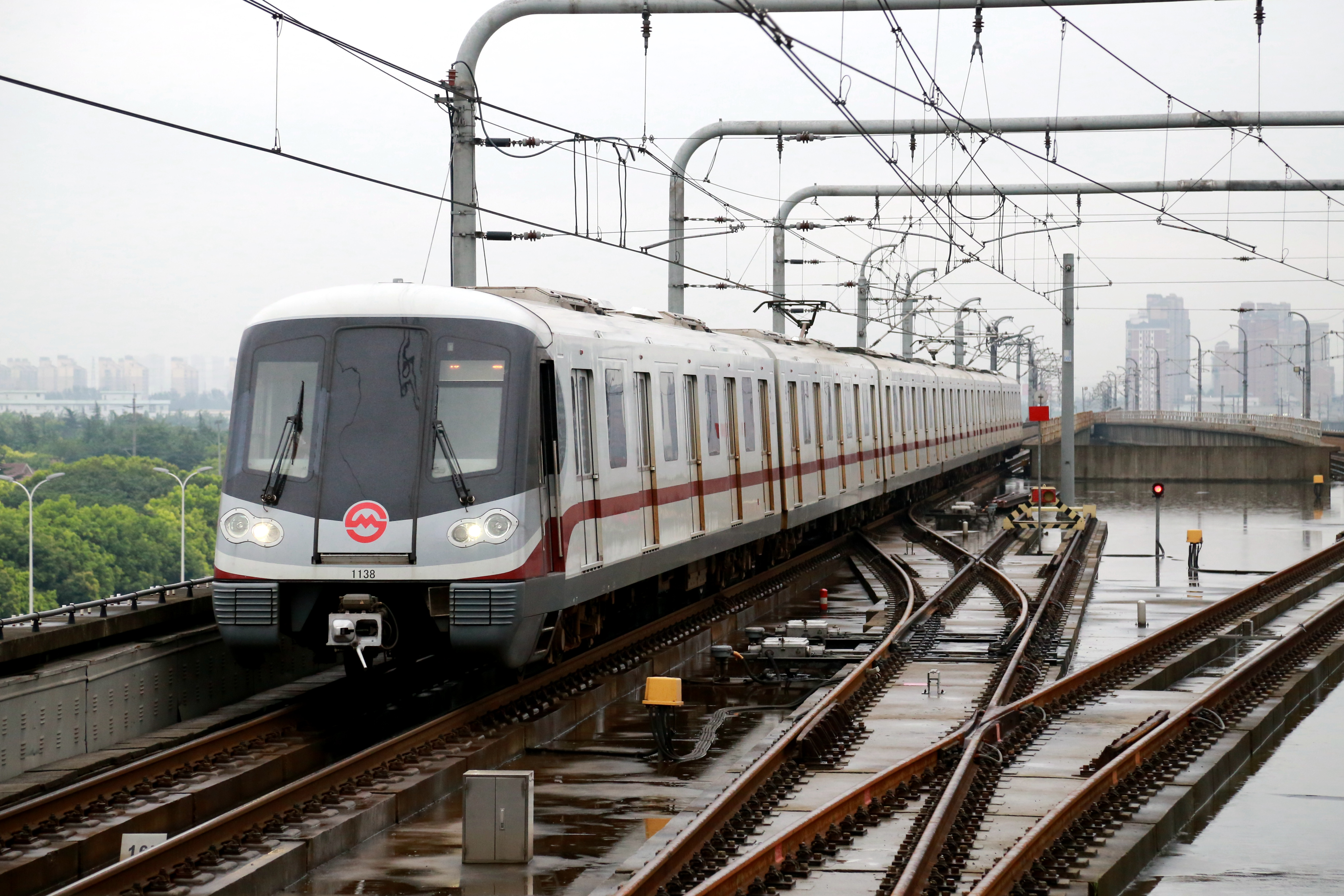
- A train entering Nanxiang

Overview
- Other names: R3 (planned name); Shenjia line (Chinese: 申嘉线)
- Native name: 上海地铁11号线
- Status: Operational
- Owner: Shanghai Rail Transit Shenjia Line Development Co., Ltd. (Shanghai segment); Kunshan Rail Transit Investment Development Co., Ltd. (Kunshan segment)
- Locale: Pudong; Xuhui, Changning, Putuo, and Jiading districts, Shanghai, China; Kunshan, Jiangsu, China
- Termini: North Jiading / Huaqiao; Disney Resort
- Stations: 40

Service
- Type: Rapid transit
- System: Shanghai Metro
- Services: Mainline: Disney Resort ↔ North Jiading; Branchline: Disney Resort ↔ Huaqiao
- Operator(s): Shanghai No. 2 Metro Operation Co. Ltd.
- Depot(s): Shanghai Circuit Depot; North Jiading Yard; Chuanyang River Yard
- Rolling stock: 11A01; 11A02; 11A03
- Daily ridership: 1.012 million (2019 peak)

History
- Commenced: December 30, 2005; 20 years ago
- Opened: December 31, 2009; 16 years ago
- Last extension: April 26, 2016; 10 years ago

Technical
- Line length: 82.4 km (51.20 mi)
- Number of tracks: 2
- Character: Underground, open cut + elevated
- Track gauge: 1,435 mm (4 ft 8 1/2 in)
- Electrification: Overhead lines (1500 volts DC)
- Operating speed: 100 km/h (62 mph); Average speed: 40.3 km/h (25 mph) (mainline) 38.8 km/h (24 mph) (branchline)
- Signalling: Thales’ SelTracTM CBTC
Route map
Route on the Shanghai map:
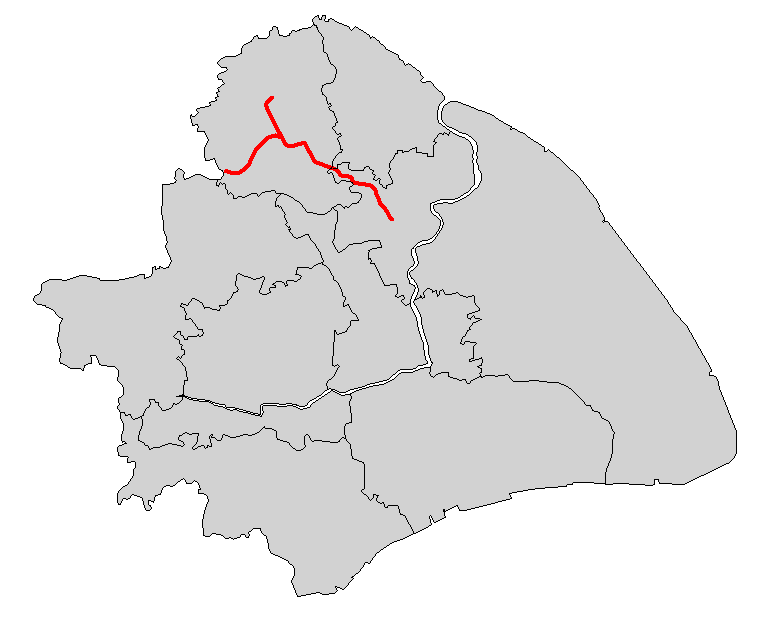
To scale geographic map:

Line 11 is a northwest–southeast line of the Shanghai Metro network. Its colour is maroon. Since October 2013, Line 11 also serves neighbouring Kunshan, making it the first interprovincial and the second intercity metro in China (after the Guangfo Metro). With a single-line mileage of 82.386 kilometres (51.192 mi), it is the third-longest single-line subway line in China, after Line 6 of Chongqing (85.6 km, 53.2 mi) and Line 7 of Wuhan (83.6 km, 51.9 mi).

== History ==
The line 11 was originally planned to be from Jiading to Nanhui New City, with a total length of 120 kilometres (75 mi), the south part of the line has been transferred to line 16.

The 1st phase of line 11, which runs from North Jiading to Jiangsu Road, opened on 31 December 2009. A branch line from Anting opened on 29 March 2010.

The 2nd phase runs from Jiangsu Road to Luoshan Road. It opened on 31 August 2013.

The 3rd phase connects Luoshan Road and the Disney Resort. This section is 9.4 kilometres (5.8 mi) long with three stations. All new stations except for the Disney Resort station opened on December 19, 2015. The Disney Resort started to trial operation on April 26, 2016.

From January 26, 2020 until March 24, the Kunshan section of line 11 (Anting to Huaqiao) was suspended due to the COVID-19 pandemic.

On August 25, 2020, an infill station at Chenxiang Highway was opened.

On February 14, 2022, the Kunshan section of line 11 was again suspended due to the COVID-19 pandemic. It was reopened on July 4, 2022.

On September 28, 2024, an infill station Kangheng Road was opened.

Shanghai Metro Line 11 opening history
Segment	Commencement	Opened	Length	Station(s)	Name	Investment
Jiangsu Road — North Jiading	30 Dec 2005	31 Dec 2009	33.0 km (20.51 mi)	16	Phase 1 (main section)	¥18.95 billion
Jiading Xincheng — Anting	30 Dec 2005	29 Mar 2010	12.8 km (7.95 mi)	3	Phase 1 (branch section)	¥18.95 billion
East Changji Road		26 Apr 2011	Infill station	1		¥18.95 billion
Luoshan Road — Jiangsu Road	19 Dec 2008	31 Aug 2013	19.2 km (11.93 mi)	12	Phase 2	¥12.965 billion
Anting — Huaqiao	27 Oct 2010	16 Oct 2013	7.0 km (4.35 mi)	3	Huaqiao extension	¥1.849 billion
Kangxin Highway — Luoshan Road	28 May 2013	19 Dec 2015	4.10 km (2.55 mi)	2	Disney extension (1st section)	¥4.371 billion
Disney Resort — Kangxin Highway	28 May 2013	26 Apr 2016	5.08 km (3.16 mi)	1	Disney extension (2nd section)	¥4.371 billion
Chenxiang Highway		25 Aug 2020	Infill station	1
Kangheng Road		28 Sep 2024	Infill station	1

=== Controversy ===
Due to the long length of line 11 and high passenger volumes, it is common for line 11 passengers to be forced to stand on the train for their entire trip. In response to this, in 2014, some passengers who travelled long distances between the urban area and the suburban areas of Jiading or Sanlin who could not bear standing for a long time started bringing their own folding seats into the carriages. Shanghai Metro said there is a safety hazard when sitting on personal benches. In the following years, the official Weibo of Shanghai Metro also reminded passengers of the phenomenon of "bench tribe" to be safe and civilized. Beginning in 2019, Line 11 posted relevant reminders in the carriages, and reminded passengers not to use their own benches in the carriages through the carriage broadcast.

== Stations ==
=== Service routes ===
Shanghai Metro Line 11 service routes
M - Mainline: Disney Resort ↔ North Jiading; B - Branch line: Disney Resort ↔ Huaqiao; P - Partial mainline: Jiading Xincheng ↔ Luoshan Road (operates only during working day peak); C - Core: Nanxiang ↔ Luoshan Road (operates only during AM peak)
Routes		Station name		Connections	Distance			Location	Opening	Platform
M	P	English	Chinese	Connections	km		min	Location	Opening	Platform
Mainline
◕	◕	Disney Resort	迪士尼		0.00	0.00	0	Pudong	26 April 2016	Underground island
◕	◕	Kangxin Highway	康新公路		5.08	5.08	5	Pudong	19 Dec 2015	Elevated side
◕	◕	Xiuyan Road	秀沿路		2.32	7.40	8	Pudong	19 Dec 2015	Elevated side
◐	◐	Luoshan Road	罗山路	16	1.78	9.18	11	Pudong	31 Aug 2013	Elevated island
◐	◐	Yuqiao	御桥	18	2.51	11.69	14	Pudong	31 Aug 2013	Underground island
◐	◐	Kangheng Road	康恒路		1.73	13.42	17	Pudong	28 Sep 2024	Underground island
◐	◐	Pusan Road	浦三路		1.46	14.88	19	Pudong	31 Aug 2013	Underground side
◐	◐	East Sanlin	三林东		1.58	16.46	21	Pudong	31 Aug 2013	Underground island
●	●	Sanlin	三林		1.21	17.67	23	Pudong	31 Aug 2013	Underground double island
●	●	Oriental Sports Center	东方体育中心	6 8	3.13	20.8	28	Pudong	31 Aug 2013	Underground double island (shared with 6 )
●	●	Longyao Road	龙耀路		2.14	22.94	31	Xuhui	31 Aug 2013	Underground island
●	●	Yunjin Road	云锦路		0.76	23.70	33	Xuhui	31 Aug 2013	Underground island
●	●	Longhua	龙华	12	1.01	24.71	35	Xuhui	31 Aug 2013	Underground island
●	●	Shanghai Swimming Center	上海游泳馆		1.39	26.10	38	Xuhui	31 Aug 2013	Underground island
●	●	Xujiahui	徐家汇	1 9	1.85	27.95	41	Xuhui	31 Aug 2013	Underground island
●	●	Jiao Tong University	交通大学	10	0.88	28.83	43	Changning	31 Aug 2013	Underground island
●	●	Jiangsu Road	江苏路	2	2.08	30.91	46	Changning	31 Dec 2009	Underground island
●	●	Longde Road	隆德路	13	1.35	32.26	49	Putuo	31 Dec 2009	Underground island
●	●	Caoyang Road	曹杨路	3 4 14 (Note: Virtual transfer with line 14 – passengers who hold the Shanghai Public Transportation Card and transfer within 30 minutes of exiting the station are able to transfer to other lines without exiting the system.)	0.98	33.24	51	Putuo	31 Dec 2009	Underground double island (Note: The platform in the direction of Disney Resort is on the B2 floor, and the platform in the direction of North Jiading and Huaqiao is on the B3 floor. It was originally planned that line 14 would transfer at this station on the same station as this line. Later, because line 14 adopted the Wuning Road plan, the reserved platform was abandoned. Therefore, the actual use of this station is a side stacking platform.)
●	●	Fengqiao Road	枫桥路		0.81	34.05	53	Putuo	31 Dec 2009	Underground island
●	●	Zhenru	真如	14	1.05	35.10	55	Putuo	31 Dec 2009	Underground side & island
●	●	Shanghai West Railway Station	上海西站	15 SXH	1.35	36.45	57	Putuo	31 Dec 2009	Underground island
●	●	Liziyuan	李子园		1.45	37.90	60	Putuo	31 Dec 2009	Underground island
●	●	Qilianshan Road	祁连山路		1.35	39.25	62	Putuo	31 Dec 2009	Underground island
●	●	Wuwei Road	武威路		1.32	40.57	65	Putuo	31 Dec 2009	Underground island
●	●	Taopu Xincun	桃浦新村		1.59	42.16	67	Putuo	31 Dec 2009	Underground island
●	●	Nanxiang	南翔		3.13	45.29	71	Jiading	31 Dec 2009	Elevated side & island
◑	◑	Chenxiang Highway	陈翔公路		2.36	47.65	74	Jiading	25 Aug 2020	Elevated side
◑	◑	Malu	马陆		3.40	51.05	78	Jiading	31 De 2009	Elevated side
◑	◑	Jiading Xincheng	嘉定新城		2.90	53.95	82	Jiading	31 De 2009	Elevated side & island
Mainline
◔	｜	Baiyin Road	白银路		1.89	55.84	84	Jiading	31 Dec 2009	Elevated side
◔	｜	West Jiading	嘉定西		3.29	59.13	88	Jiading	31 Dec 2009	Elevated island
◔	｜	North Jiading	嘉定北		1.94	61.07	91	Jiading	31 Dec 2009	Elevated side
Branchline
	◔	Shanghai Circuit	上海赛车场		3.15	64.22	86	Jiading	29 March 2010	Open-cut side
	◔	East Changji Road	昌吉东路		5.27	69.49	91	Jiading	26 April 2011	At-grade side
	◔	Shanghai Automobile City	上海汽车城		2.25	71.74	94	Jiading	29 March 2010	Elevated side
	◔	Anting	安亭		1.84	73.58	97	Jiading	29 March 2010	Elevated island
	◔	Zhaofeng Road	兆丰路		1.12	74.70	100	Kunshan, JS	16 Oct 2013	Elevated island
	◔	Guangming Road	光明路		3.29	77.99	104	Kunshan, JS	16 Oct 2013	Elevated side
	◔	Huaqiao	花桥	11 (Suzhou Metro)	1.27	79.26	107	Kunshan, JS	16 Oct 2013	Elevated side
Passengers going to Huaqiao at Disney Resort Station, Kangxin Highway Station and Xiuyan Road Station during rush hour have to transfer at Jiading Xincheng Station.

=== Future expansions ===
==== Kangheng Road station ====
Although Kangheng Road station is part of the second phase of Line 11, it did not open with the other stations on August 31, 2013. Instead, it has been left as a reserved station under construction that will open in the future pending development in the area. It opened on 28 September 2024.

=== Station name change ===
- On May 7, 2011, Jiyang Road was renamed Oriental Sports Center (before line 11 began serving the station).

== Headways ==
Shanghai Metro Line 11 headway
Time		North Jiading - Jiading Xincheng & Huaqiao - Jiading Xincheng	Jiading Xincheng - Nanxiang	Nanxiang - Luoshan Road	Luoshan Road - Disney Resort
Monday - Friday (working days)
AM peak	7:30-9:00	Southbound: 6 - 10 min Northbound: 7 min and 30 sec - 10 min	Southbound: 3 min Northbound: 3 min and 45 sec	Southbound: 2 min Northbound: 2 min and 30 sec	Southbound: 6 min Northbound: 7 min and 30 sec
Off-peak	9:00–17:00	About 12 min	About 6 min
PM peak	17:00–19:00	Southbound: 7 min Northbound: 6 min	Southbound: 3 min and 30 sec Northbound: 2 min and 30 sec		Southbound: 7 min Northbound: 6 min
Other hours	Before 7:30 After 19:00	About 12-18 min	About 5 – 7 min
Saturday and Sunday (weekends)
Peak	8:00–20:00	10 min	About 5 min
Other hours	Before 8:00 After 20:00	About 10-12 min	About 6-8 min

== Technology ==
=== Rolling stock ===
Shanghai Metro Line 11 rolling stock
Fleet numbers	Manufacturer	Time of manufac- turing	Class	No of car	Assembly (Note: Tc: Trailer with cab; Mp: EMU with pantograph; M: EMU without pantograph.)	Rolling stock	Number	Notes
396	CRRC Zhuzhou Locomotive Co., Ltd.	2008-2011	A (Note: Class A carriage: 21-24m in length, 3.0m in width and 3.8m in height; Capacity: about 310 people.)	6	Tc+Mp+M+M+Mp+Tc	11A01	1101-1166 (110011-113961)	Some of the trains are Disney-themed, and their inside and outside are packaged with Disney cartoon elements. Original name: AC16.
36	CRRC Changchun Railway Vehicles Co., Ltd.	2015-2016	A	6	Tc+Mp+M+M+Mp+Tc	11A02	1167-1172 (113971-114321)
62	CRRC Zhuzhou Locomotive Co., Ltd.	2015-2016; 2025	A	6	Tc+Mp+M+M+Mp+Tc	11A03	1173-1182 (114331-114921)	114381 and 114372 were wrecked on December 22, 2024. They were replaced by two newly-built cars with same numbers in 2026.

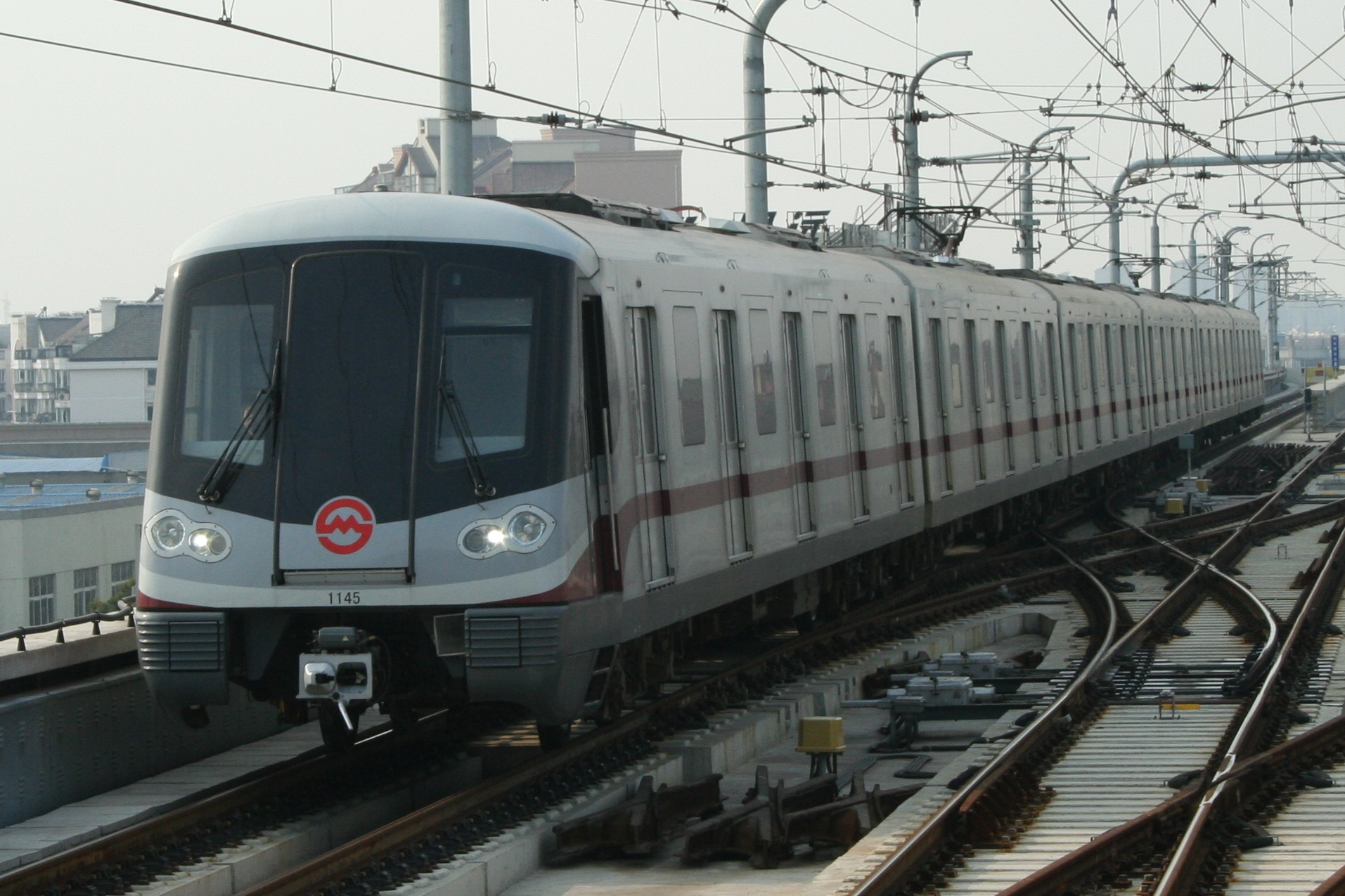
11A01 train

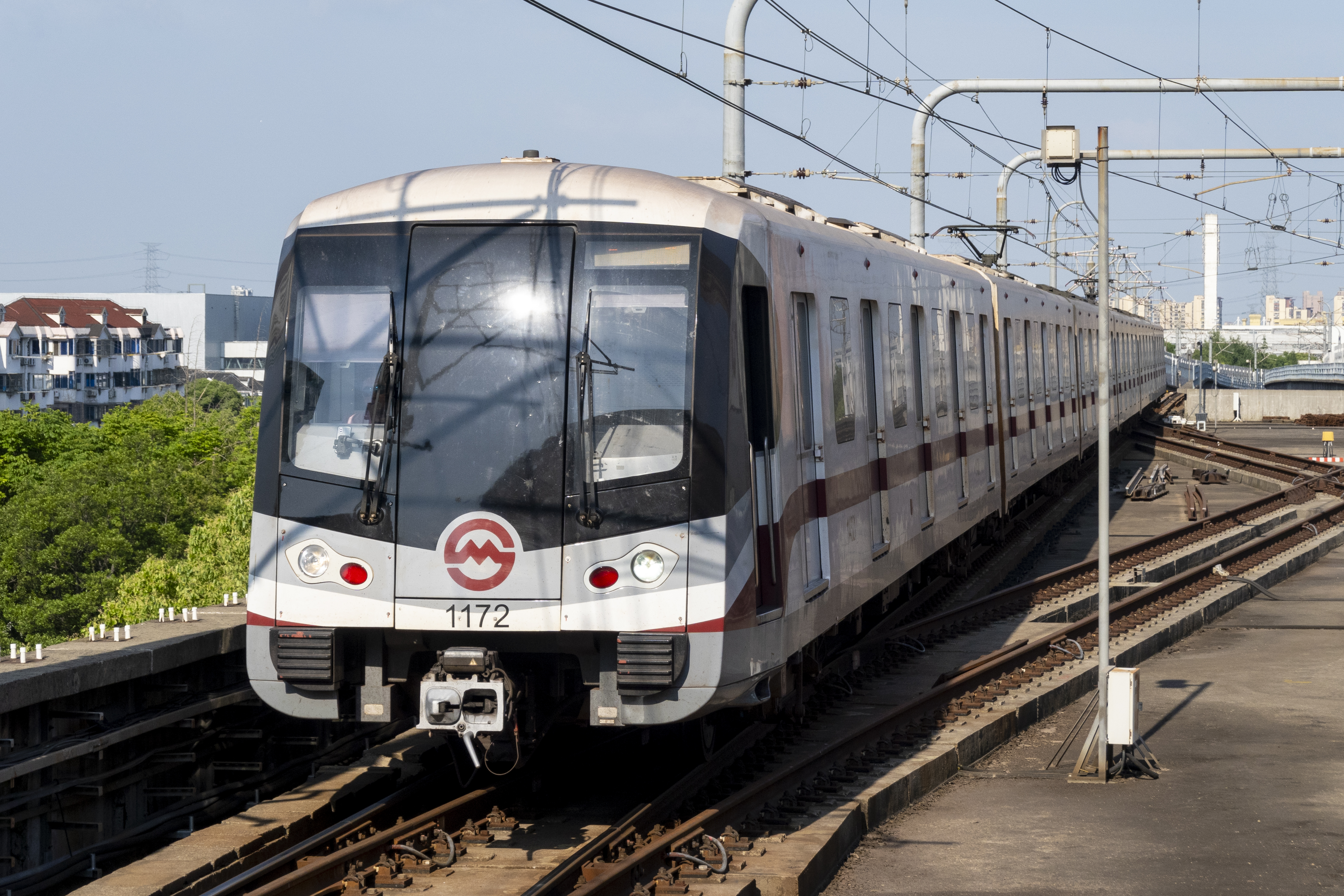
11A02 train

== Accident ==
On 22 December 2024, a northbound 11A03 train (set 1173) hit the lifting arm of a tower crane which collapsed and fell towards the track between Chenxiang Highway station and Malu station. The train's head suffered serious damages and the train stopped. Shanghai Metro announced the service suspended between Wuwei Road station and Malu station.
