= North Jiading station =

Shanghai Metro station

North Jiading 嘉定北
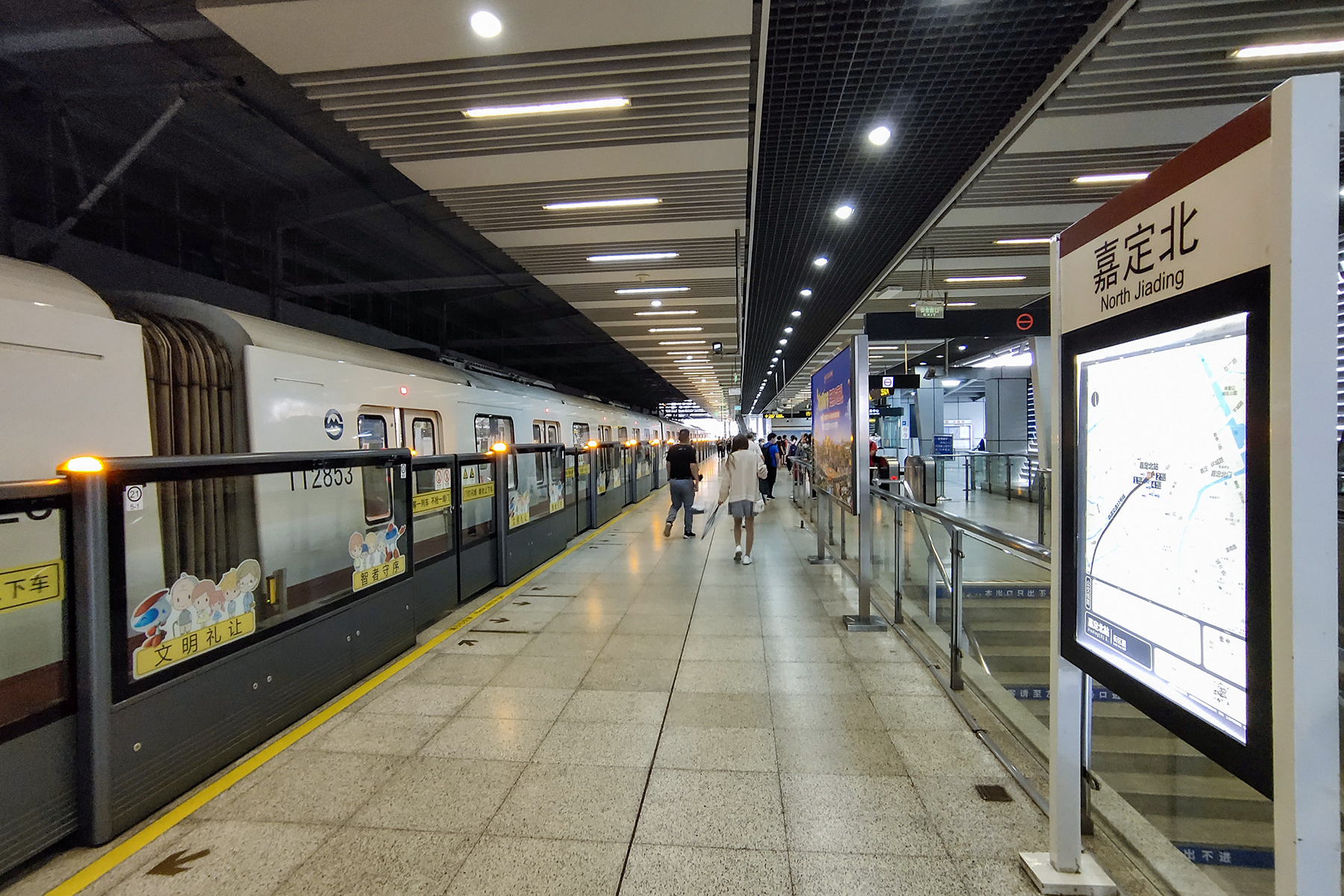
- Platform

General information
- Location: Jiading District, Shanghai; China
- Coordinates: 31.3933°N 121.232°E
- Operator: Shanghai No. 2 Metro Operation Co. Ltd.
- Line: Line 11
- Platforms: 2 (2 side platforms)
- Tracks: 2

Construction
- Structure type: Elevated
- Accessible: Yes

History
- Opened: 31 December 2009

Services
Preceding station	Shanghai Metro	Following station
Terminus	Line 11	West Jiading towards Disney Resort
Location
- Location within Shanghai

North Jiading (Chinese: 嘉定北; pinyin: Jiādìng Běi) is a station on Line 11 of the Shanghai Metro. Located on the north side of Pingcheng Road near Chengbei Road, it is the current northern terminus of the mainline service of Line 11.

This station has two sides, one of which is for passengers to board, and the other side to alight. Every side is composed of a station hall and platform at the same layer, and the two sides are not connected in the paid area. The alighting side is connected to a market nearby and Jiading North Bus Station.

== Places nearby ==
- Shanghai University, Jiading Campus
- Jiading North Bus Station
