= Huaqiao metro station (Kunshan) =

Shanghai Metro station and Suzhou Rail Transit station in Kunshan, Jiangsu

Huaqiao 花桥
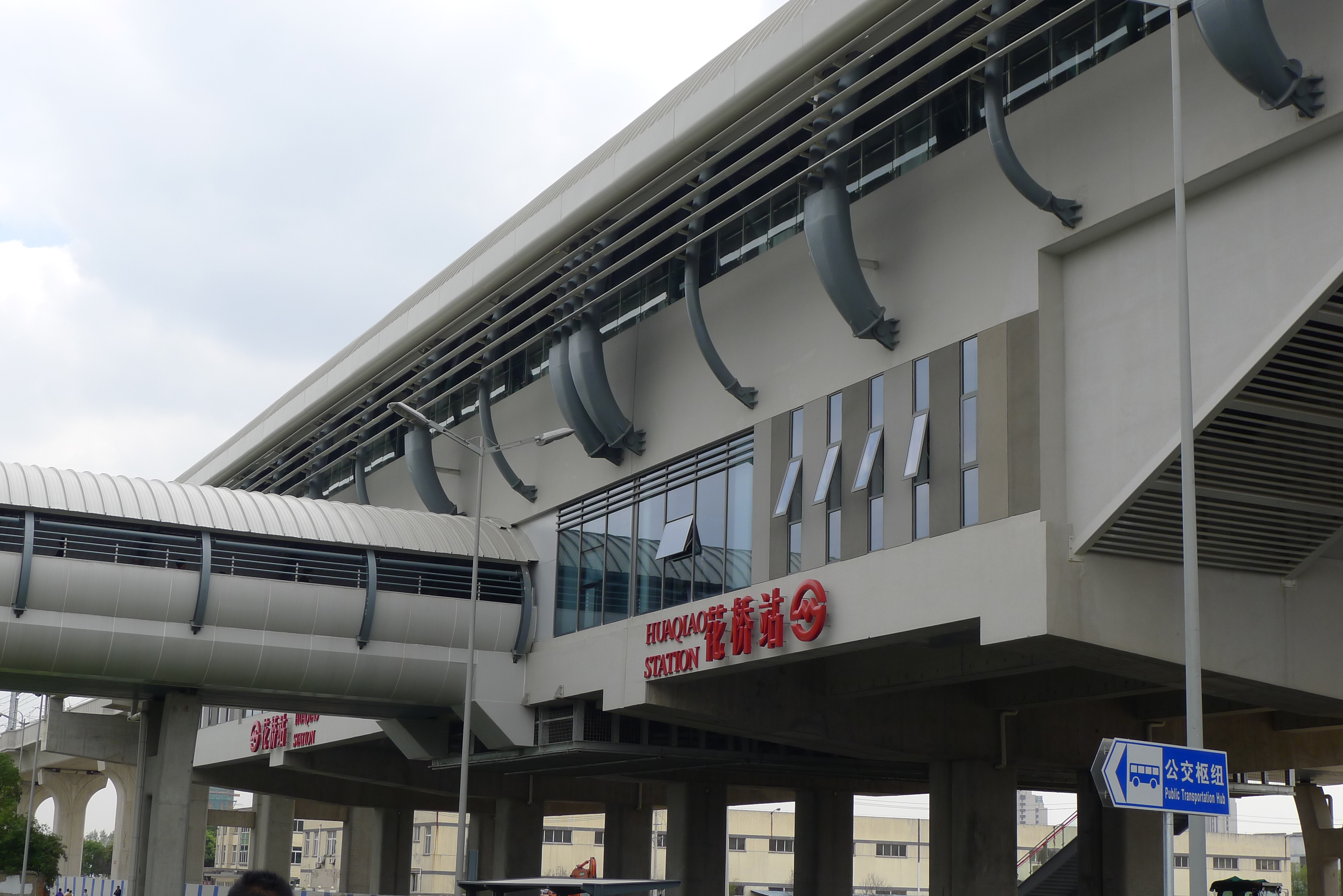

Chinese name
- Simplified Chinese: 花桥
- Traditional Chinese: 花橋
Transcriptions
Standard Mandarin
- Hanyu Pinyin: Huāqiáo
Yue: Cantonese
- Jyutping: faa1 kiu4

General information
- Location: Guangming Road (光明路) and Yanhu Avenue (沿沪大道); Huaqiao, Kunshan, Suzhou, Jiangsu; China
- Coordinates: 31.3006°N 121.0998°E
- Operator: Shanghai No. 2 Metro Operation Co. Ltd. (Shanghai Metro Line 11) Suzhou Rail Transit Group (Suzhou Rail Transit Line 11)
- Line: Line 11 (Shanghai Metro); Line 11 (Suzhou Metro)
- Platforms: 4 (4 platforms)
- Tracks: 4

Construction
- Structure type: Elevated (Shanghai Metro Line 11); Underground (Suzhou Metro Line 11)
- Accessible: Yes

History
- Opened: 16 October 2013 (Shanghai Metro Line 11); 24 June 2023 (Suzhou Metro Line 11)

Services
Preceding station	Shanghai Metro	Following station
Terminus	Line 11 branch	Guangming Road towards Disney Resort
Preceding station	Suzhou Metro	Following station
Huaxigongyuan towards Weiting	Line 11	Terminus
Location

Huaqiao (simplified Chinese: 花桥; traditional Chinese: 花橋; pinyin: Huāqiáo) is a metro station on Line 11 of the Shanghai Metro and Line 11 of the Suzhou Metro. Located at the intersection of Guangming Road and Yanhu Avenue in Huaqiao, Kunshan, Suzhou, Jiangsu, it serves as the current western terminus on the branch line of Shanghai Metro Line 11 and the Eastern terminus of the Suzhou Metro Line 11.

== History ==
=== Shanghai Metro ===
The station for Shanghai Metro Line 11 opened on 16 October 2013. It is an elevated station. It is one of three stations in the Shanghai Metro system that is not located in the municipality of Shanghai itself, the other two being Guangming Road and Zhaofeng Road, which are adjacent on the line.

From 26 January 2020 to 24 March 2020, and from 14 February 2022 to 3 April 2022, services on a segment of Shanghai Metro Line 11 between Huaqiao and Anting stations were suspended due to the COVID-19 pandemic.

=== Suzhou Metro ===
The station for Suzhou Metro Line 11 opened on 24 June 2023 as an underground station, which makes it an interchange between two rail systems.

== Structure ==
Huaqiao Station of Shanghai Metro is an elevated station with two side platforms, with one concourse that is composed of two individual paid zones. Huaqiao Station of Suzhou Metro is an underground station with one island platform.

There are three transfer channels between the two parts: one for the east paid zone of Shanghai Metro Huaqiao concourse, one for the west zone, and another (in the middle) for the unpaid zone. When transferring through these transfer channels except the middle one, no extra security check is needed.

The transfer channels connects Shanghai Metro and Suzhou Metro, which use different pricing systems. Passengers who use specified mobile applications and have enabled "senseless transfer" may transfer without getting out and again getting in the gates. Other passengers, including those using public transportation cards or single journey tickets, should get out and in through the gates of different systems.

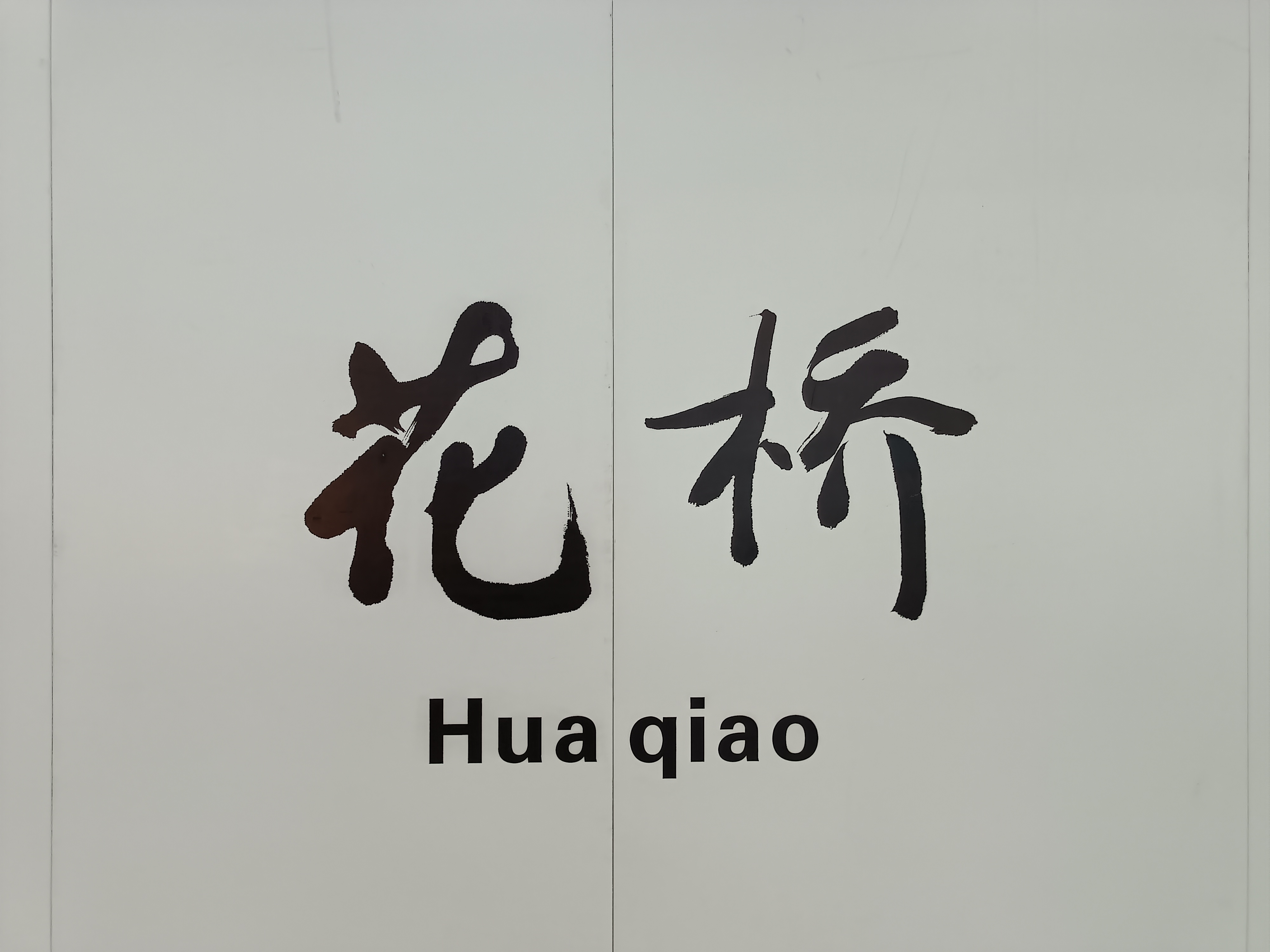
The name wall of Huaqiao Station of Suzhou Metro Line 11

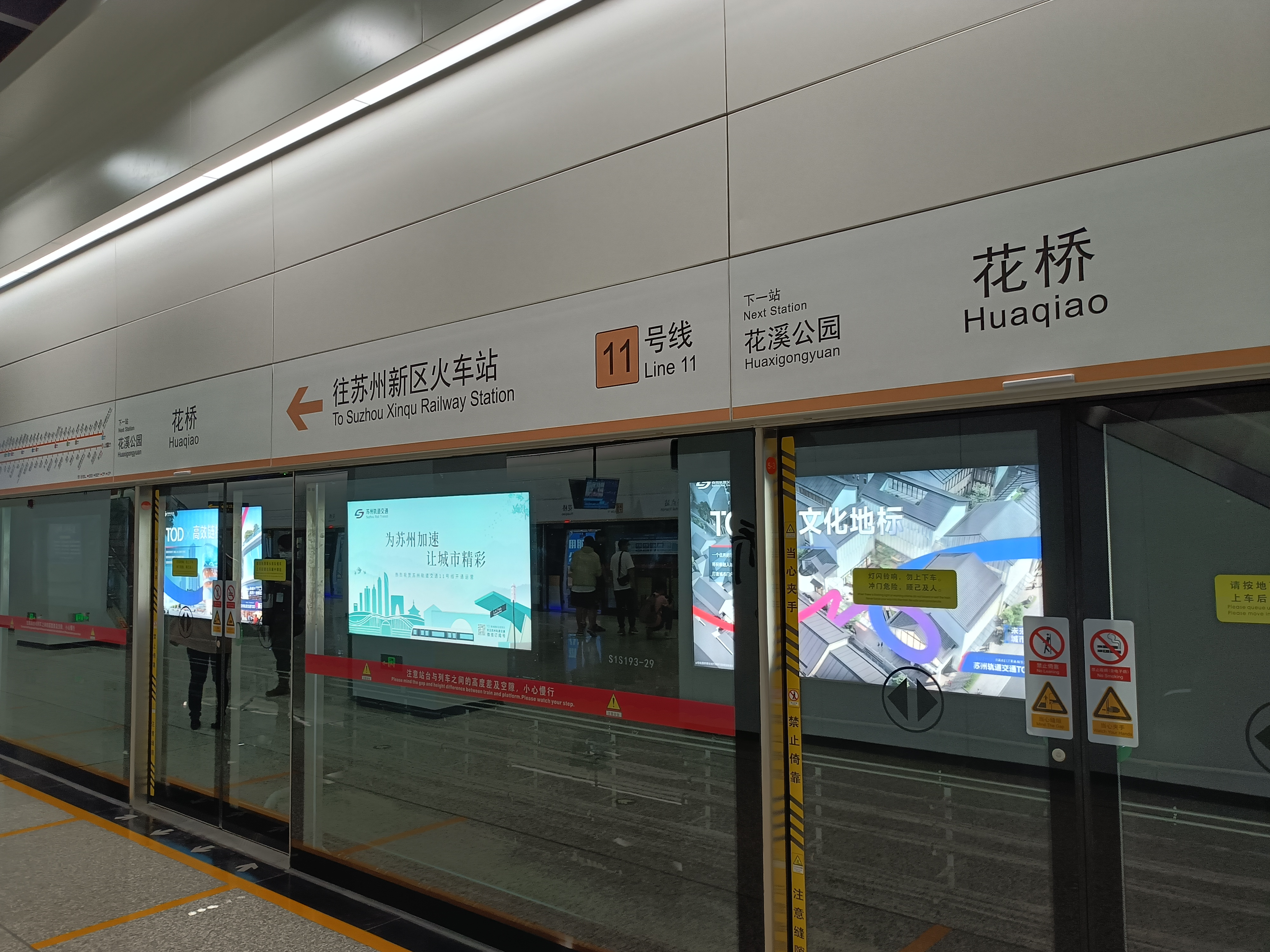
The platform of Huaqiao Station of Suzhou Metro Line 11

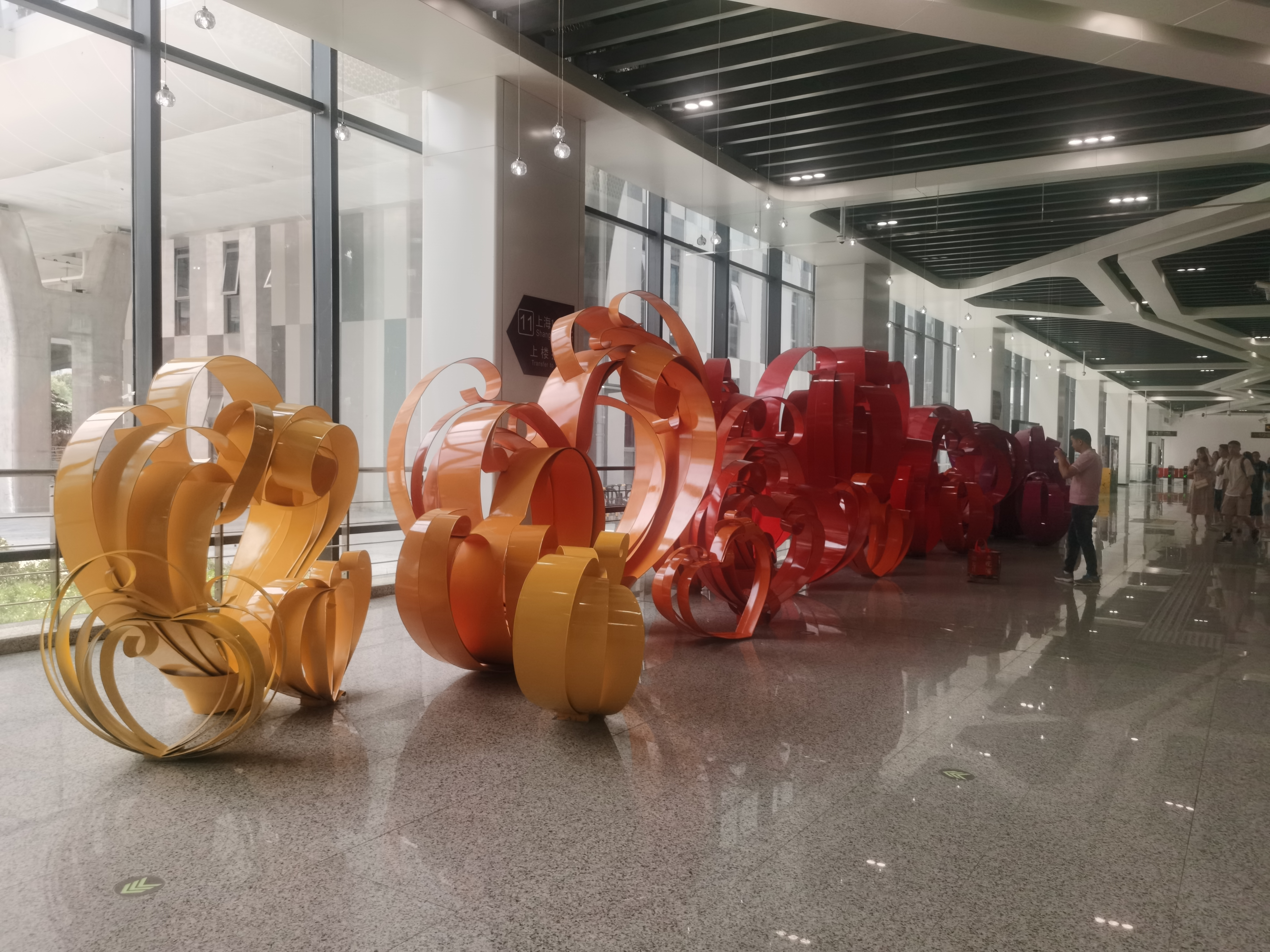
The sculpture in the concourse of Huaqiao of Suzhou Metro Line 11

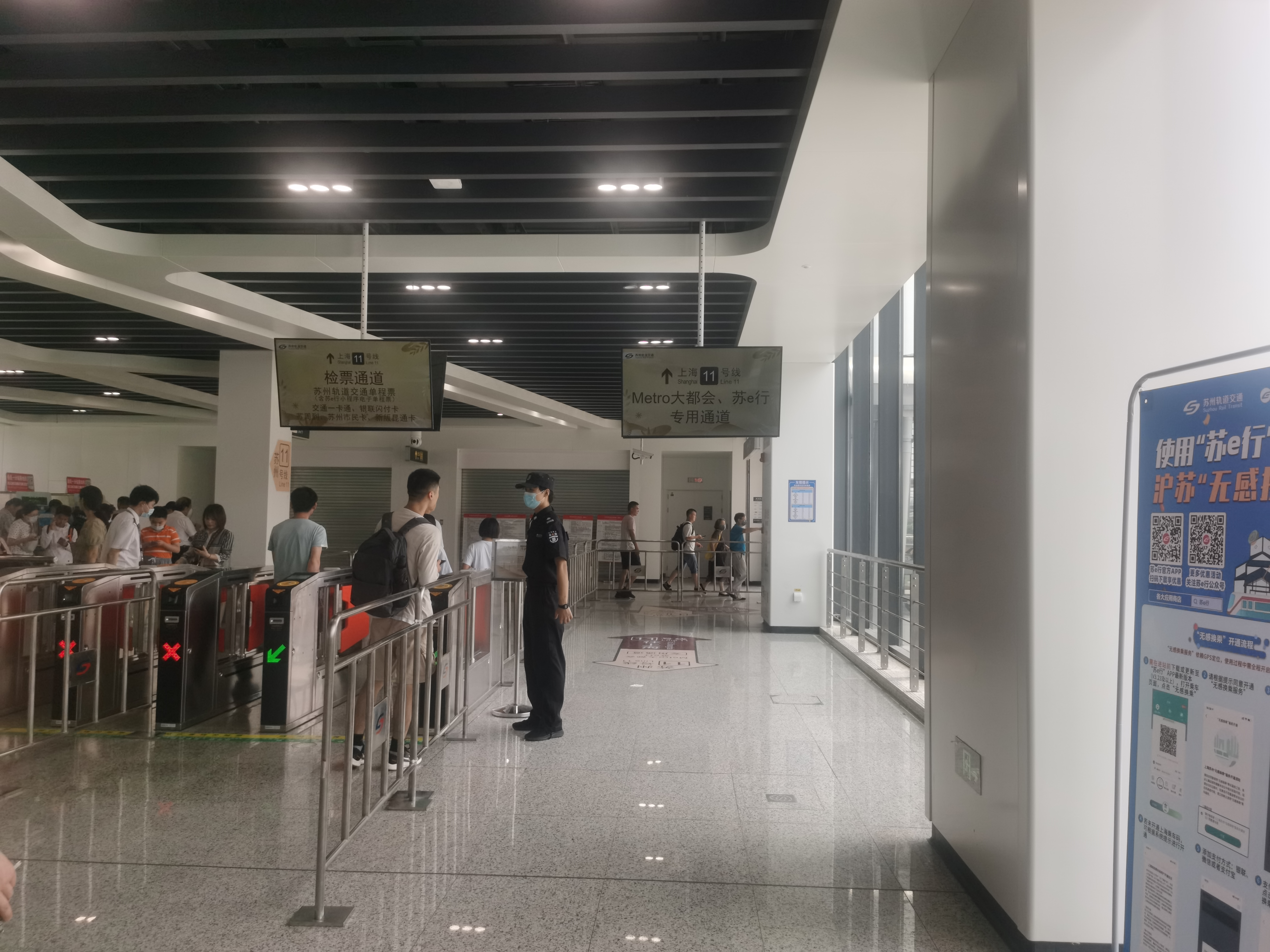
Transfer booth of Shanghai Metro

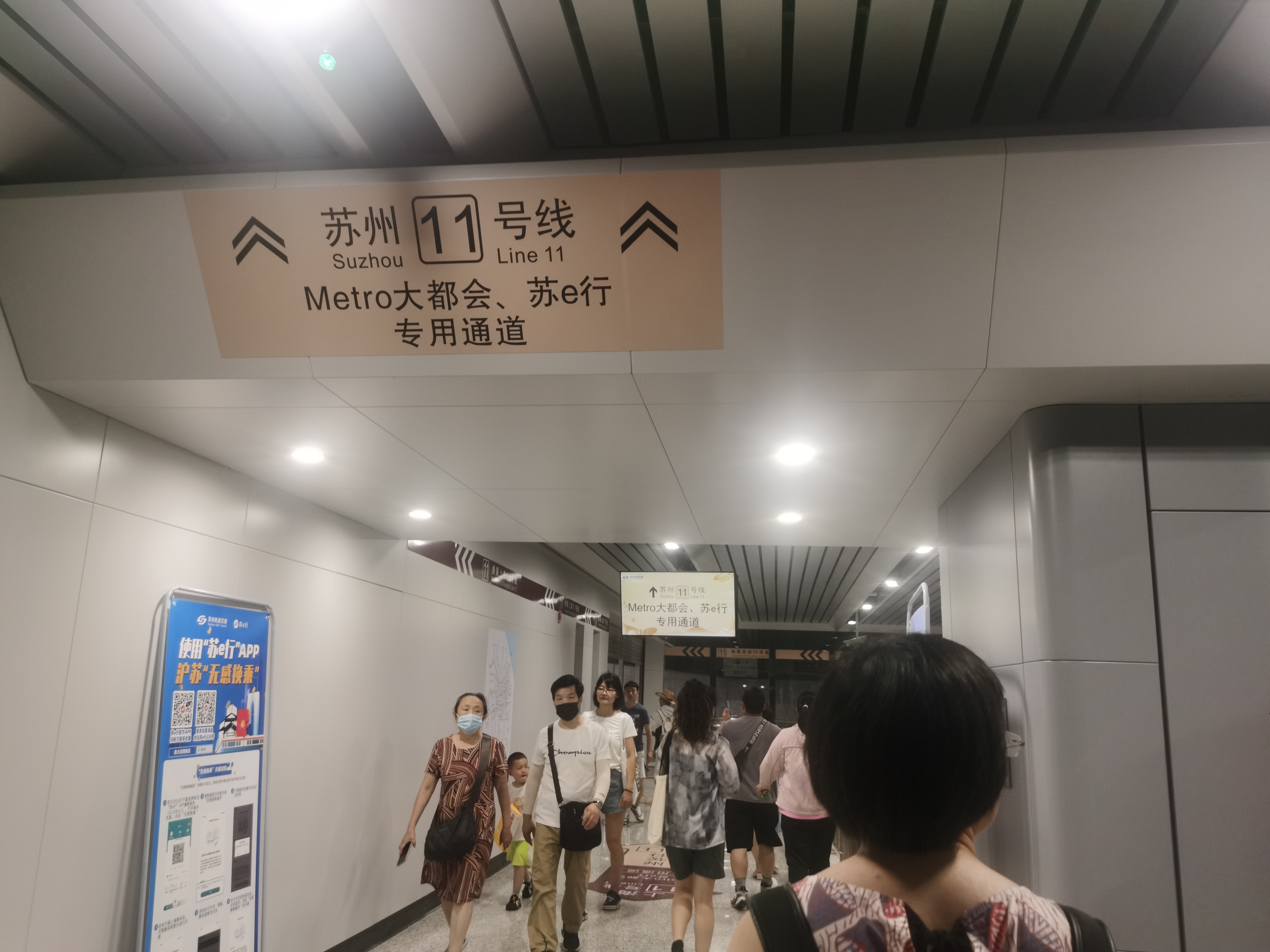
Transfer booth of Suzhou Metro
