= Disney Resort station =

Shanghai Metro Station

Disney Resort 迪士尼
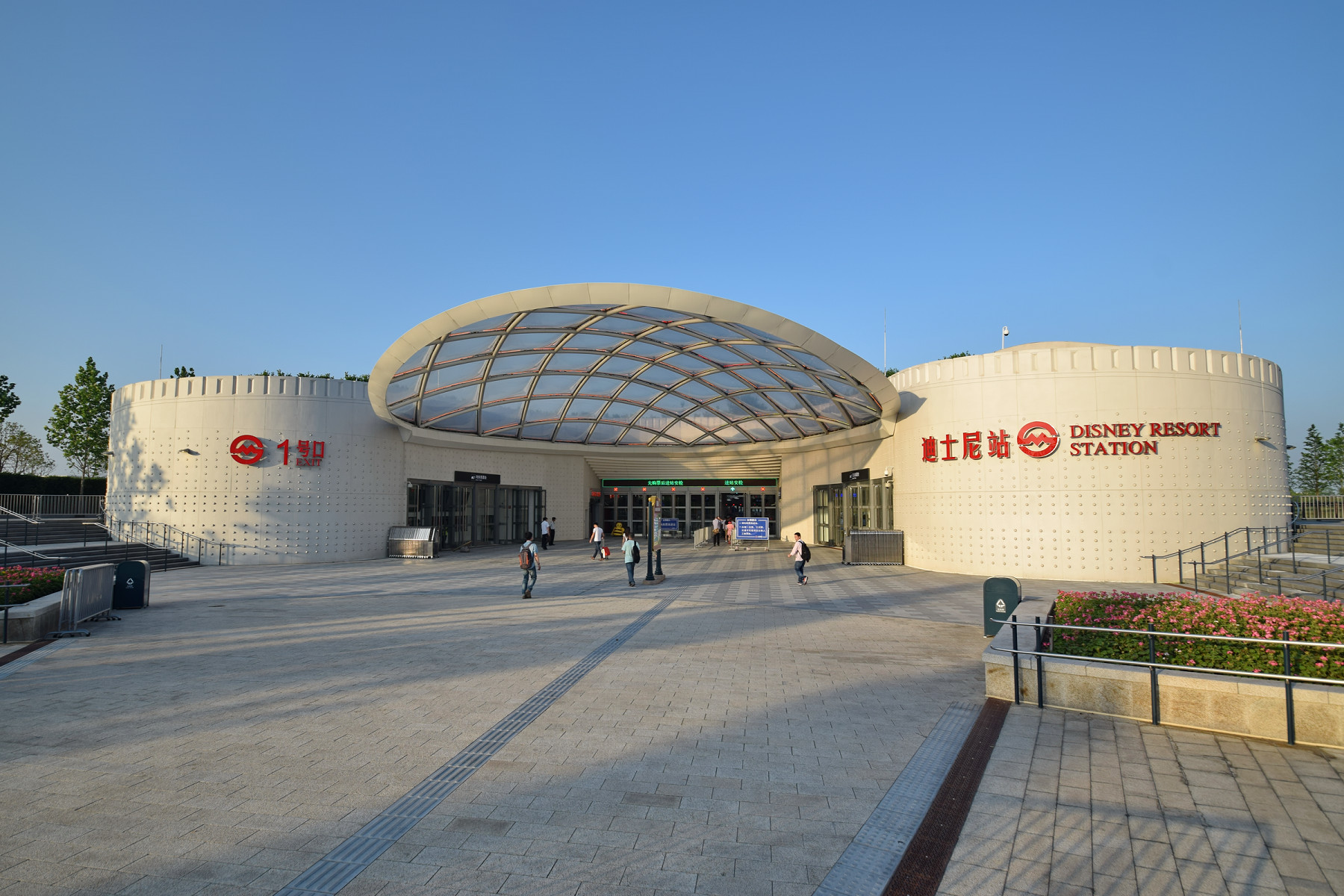
- Station exterior

Chinese name
- Chinese: 迪士尼
- Literal meaning: Disney
Transcriptions
Standard Mandarin
- Hanyu Pinyin: Díshìní
Yue: Cantonese
- Jyutping: dik6 si6 nei4

General information
- Location: North side of Wishing Star Lake (星愿湖), Shanghai Disney Resort, Chuansha, Pudong New Area, Shanghai; China
- Coordinates: 31.143429°N 121.663737°E
- Operator: Shanghai No. 2 Metro Operation Co. Ltd.
- Line: Line 11
- Platforms: 2 (1 island platform)
- Tracks: 2

Construction
- Structure type: Underground
- Accessible: Yes

History
- Opened: April 26, 2016; 10 years ago (operational); June 16, 2016; 10 years ago (official)

Services
Preceding station	Shanghai Metro	Following station
Kangxin Highway towards North Jiading or Huaqiao	Line 11	Terminus
South Shenjiang Road towards Dongjing Road	Line 21 Future service	Tanghuang Road towards Shanghai East Railway Station
Route map
Location
- Location within Shanghai

Disney Resort (Chinese: 迪士尼; pinyin: Díshìní) is a station on Line 11 of the Shanghai Metro in Shanghai's Pudong New Area. Located within the Shanghai Disney Resort complex, it serves as the eastern terminus of Line 11 and also a transportation hub for travel to and within the resort area. The station opened on April 26, 2016, and is known for its design, including a blue color scheme, fantasy elements, and skylight roof, and is fully accessible.

== History ==
The station opened for "soft" passenger trial operation on April 26, 2016, two months prior to the opening of the Shanghai Disney Resort. During the trial period, due to the continuing construction around the metro station, passengers were suggested to avoid using the station. The station was ready for full passenger operation with the opening of the resort complex on June 16, 2016.

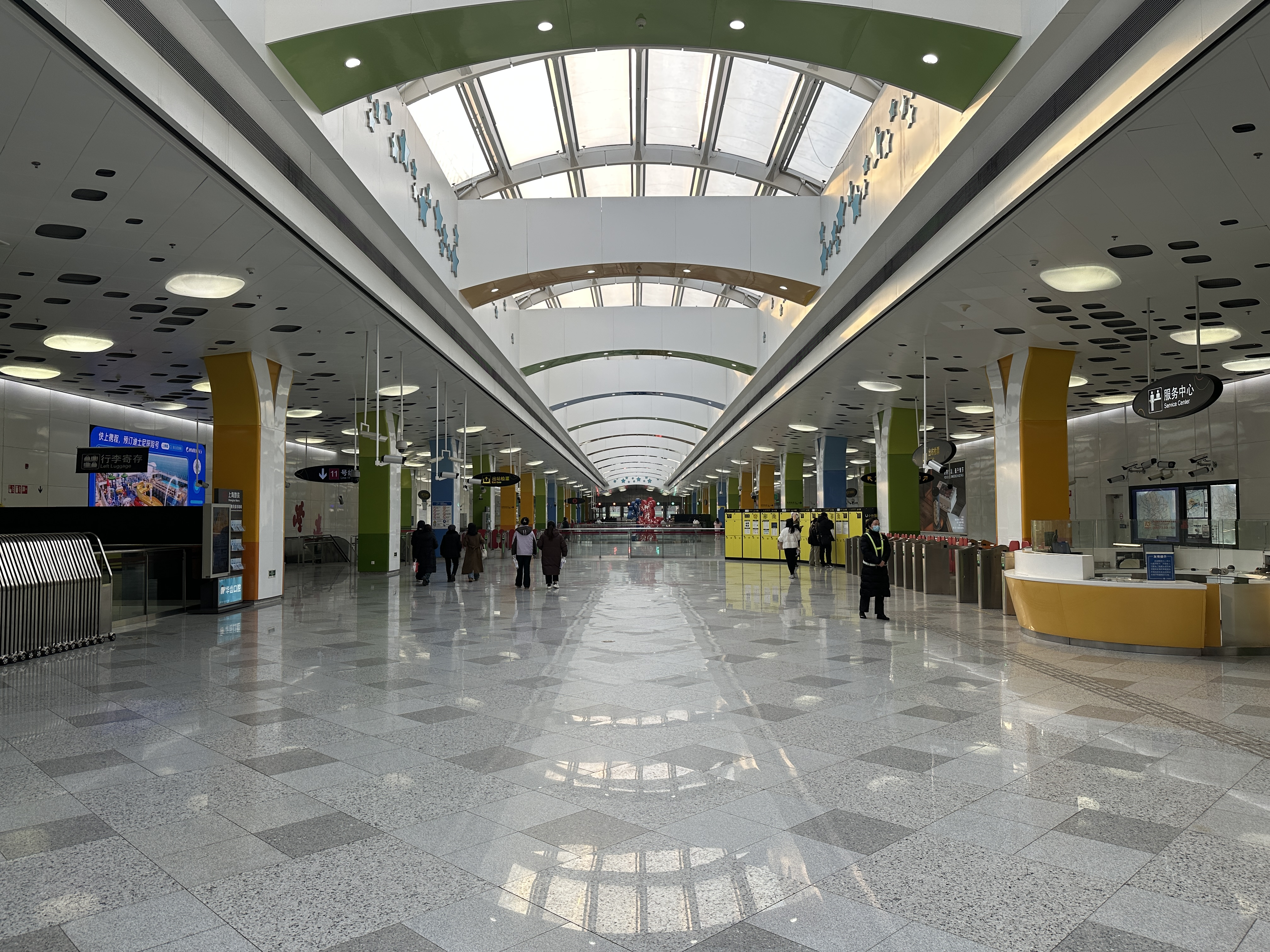
Concourse

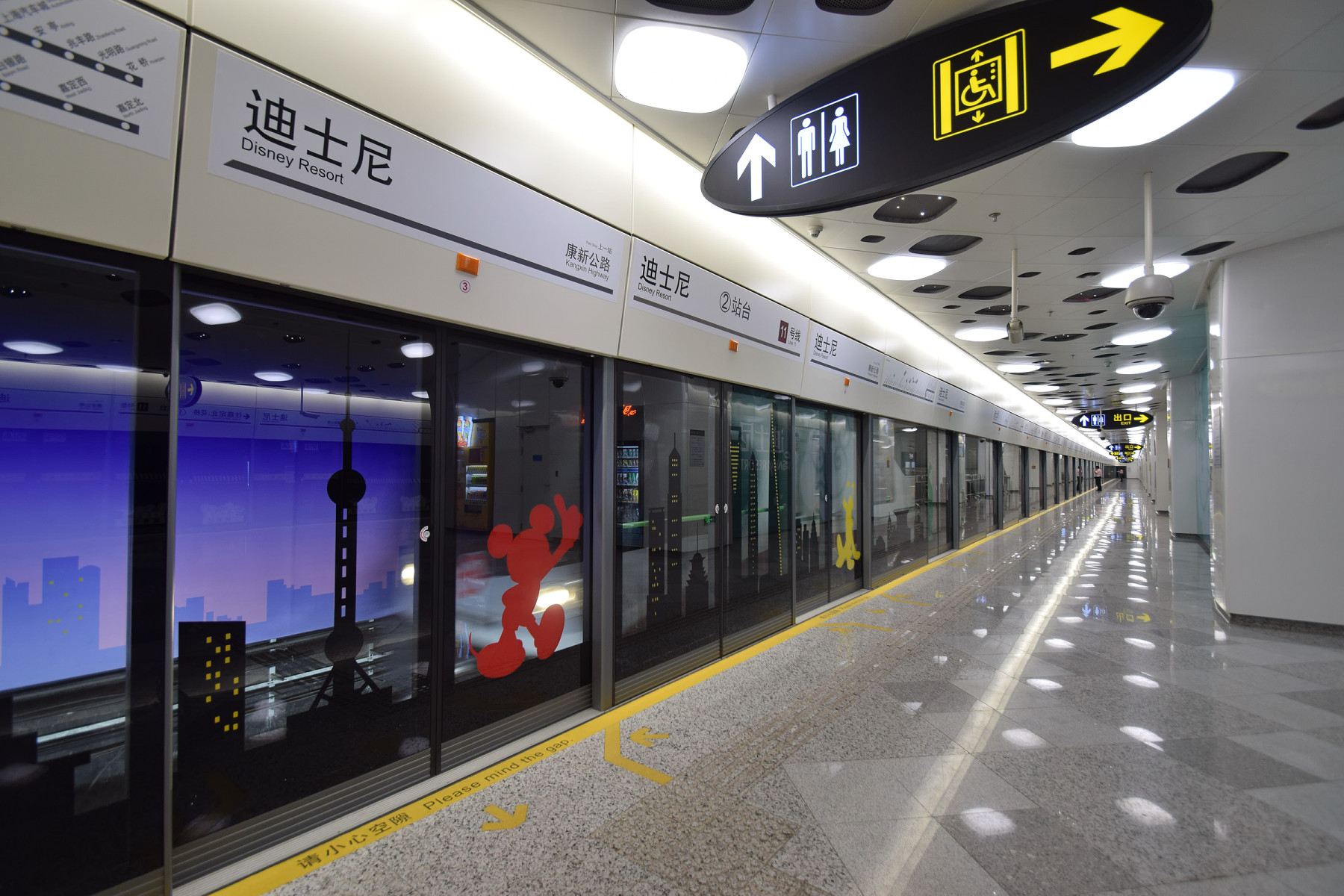
Platform

== Description ==
The station is located within the Shanghai Disney Resort complex, just east of the gates to Shanghai Disneyland Park and north of Wishing Star Park and overlooking the Wishing Star Lake. On the north side of the station is a bus terminal which provides bus services to areas throughout the park.

The station structure itself is semi-underground, with the concourse located at street level and the platform one level below. Located at concourse level are ticket machines, fare gates, and customer service counters. There are four entrances to the station. Toilets are available on the platform level, at the west end, within the fare-paid zone. Like all stations on Line 11, Disney Resort Station is fully accessible. There are two elevators which connect the concourse level to the platform.

For the extension to this station, three of Line 11's 60 trains have been decorated with Disney elements, similar to the Hong Kong Disneyland Resort line. However, unlike its Hong Kong counterpart, the line's Disney livery is not as extensive, since the line is primarily a commuter metro line that serves other suburban districts of Shanghai, as opposed to a dedicated line servicing mostly resort guests. The station itself incorporates a blue color scheme that highlights fantasy elements, which was selected by a public poll. A skylight ceiling above the concourse level brings natural light indoors.

=== Service ===
Service is provided daily at this station from 06:00 to 22:30. During the weekday morning and evening rush hour period, all trains departing Disney Resort station head for North Jiading. At all other times, both North Jiading and Huaqiao-bound trains begin their trips at the station.

=== Exits ===
There are four exits of the station:

- Exit 1: Disneyland, west side
- Exit 2: Wishing Star Park, south side
- Exit 3: East Shendi Road, east side
- Exit 4: Bus terminal, north side

== See also ==
- Shanghai International Resort station, an underground suburban rail station that is 2 kilometres (1.2 mi) northeast of this station on the Airport Link Line of Shanghai Suburban Railway
- Rail transport in Walt Disney Parks and Resorts
