= Shanghai Bus Route 55 =

Bus route in Shanghai, China

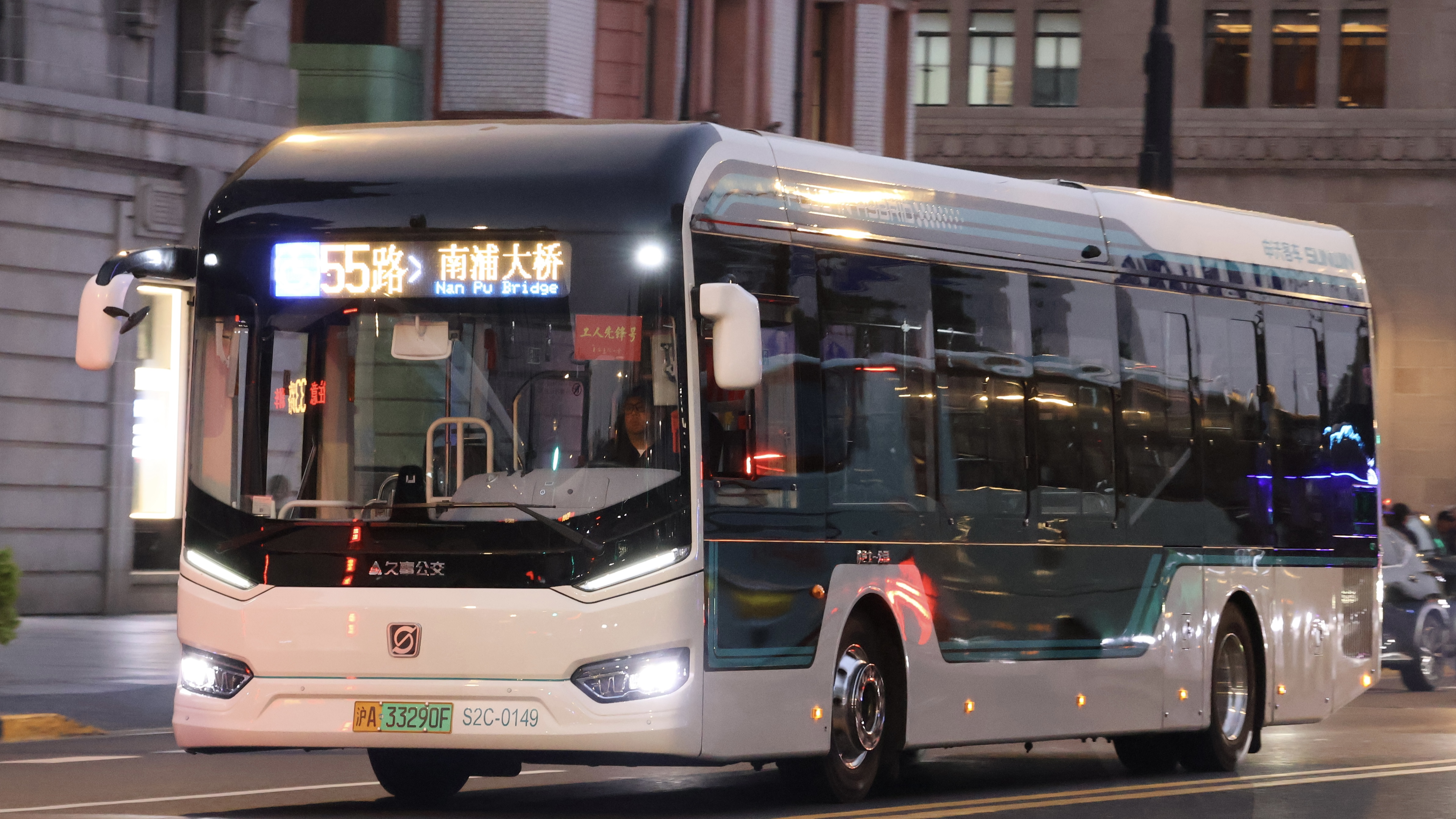
- A Sunwin iHEV12LE at The Bund in November 2024.

Overview
- Operator: Shanghai Ba-Shi No.1 Public Transport Co. Ltd (巴士一公司)
- Began service: 15 June 1952

Route
- Route type: Bus route
- Start: Nanpu Bridge
- Via: The Bund, Siping Road, Songhu Road, Shiguang Road, Guohe Road
- End: Xinjiangwancheng Estate (Shijie Road)
- Length: 17.4 kilometres (10.7 mi)

Service
- Frequency: 3-5 minutes (peak hours); 8-12 minutes (non-peak hours)

Route 55 is a bus route in Shanghai, China. Operated by Shanghai Ba-Shi No.1 Public Transportation Co. Ltd, a subsidiary of Jiushi Group, it runs between Nanpu Bridge and Xinjiangwancheng Estate (Shijie Road), via The Bund and Siping Road. Route 55 originally started operations on 15 June 1952, with a special line designated route ZX55 and later renumbered 910 introduced in the 1990s. On 25 March 2012, the two routes were merged together, with the original route 55 cancelled and route 910 renumbered as 55. It was designated as a trunk bus route along Siping Road in 2017.

== History ==
=== Route 55 (1952 – 2012) ===
In 1950, the Shanghai Municipal Bus Company opened a new bus route from Wujiaochang to the city center. The initial terminus in the city was set at Shanghai North railway station, before moving to various other locations, including North Sichuan Road and Tiantong Road. The route was finalized as running between Wujiaochang and Guangdong Road & The Bund and numbered as route 55 on 15 June 1952.

Following the widening of Siping Road in 1983, several roads on which route 55 runs were renamed, such as Liyang Road becoming part of Siping Road. During this period, route 55 was the main method of transport from Wujiaochang to the city center, with demand so high that people had to stand on the road while waiting for the bus.

=== Route ZX55/910 (1992 – 2012) ===
In 1992, Shanghai Ba-Shi Public Transport Company (present day Jiushi Public Transport) launched 23 special bus routes (Chinese: 专线公交) with route numbers starting with "ZX", including route ZX55. Buses used on these routes are equipped with high-backed soft seats, and are more comfortable than ordinary buses, but ticket fares for these routes are higher and monthly bus passes cannot be used. Route ZX55 ran along the same path as the ordinary route 55 at launch, before being extended to Nanpu Bridge on 27 January 1994. In February that year, route ZX55 became the first bus route in Shanghai to introduce Chinese-made double-decker buses.

In 1997, route ZX55 was renumbered as 910 and had its special bus route status removed, becoming a regular bus route with its path unchanged. In 2002, both routes 55 and 910 introduced air-conditioned buses. In 2004, route 910 was extended to Xinjiangwancheng Estate (Shijie Road). With the addition of electronic bus stop signages along Siping Road, all buses on routes 55 and 910 were installed with onboard GPS to enable real-time bus arrival notifications.

During the 2010 Shanghai Expo, route 910 was selected to become part of the Expo bus route network, with a route variant named Expo Line 23 launched. Initially an express service skipping numerous stops along the regular route 910, Expo Line 23 was eventually merged with the regular route in late May due to lack of ridership.

=== Re-numbering of route 910 as new route 55 ===
On 16 March 2012, Oriental Morning Post reported that route 55 would be withdrawn from the 25th of the same month and replaced by route 147. Following this announcement, discussions on the sentimental value of route 55 took place on Weibo, with some voicing their opposition to the amendments. On 20 March, in a follow-up announcement, the Shanghai Municipal Transportation and Port Authority reaffirmed plans to withdraw the original route 55 as scheduled, but added that route 910 would be renumbered as the new route 55 simultaneously in order to meet the "strong emotional needs" of commuters. The authority also committed to "retain the older route numbers as much as possible" in future.

In September 2017, as part of the "one road, one trunk bus route" amendments along Siping Road, route 55 was designated as the trunk bus route, with the number of buses allocated increased to 35 from the original 29. In addition, a limited-stop variant of route 55 was introduced during peak hours on weekdays.

== Route information ==
Route 55 charges a flat fare of RMB2. The frequency of the route is 3–5 minutes during peak hours, and 8–12 minutes during non-peak hours.

The route passes by the following landmarks:

- 8 Shiguang Road station
- Jiangwan Stadium & 10 Jiangwan Stadium station
- Wujiaochang & 10 Wujiaochang station
- Shanghai Open University
- 10 18 Guoquan Road station
- Tongji University & 10 Tongji University station
- 8 10 Siping Road station
- 10 Youdian Xincun station
- 4 10 Hailun Road station
- Shanghai General Hospital
- The Bund
- Nanjing Road
- Yu Garden
- Nanpu Bridge & 4 Nanpu Bridge station
