= Sanmen Road station =

Shanghai Metro station

Sanmen Road 三门路
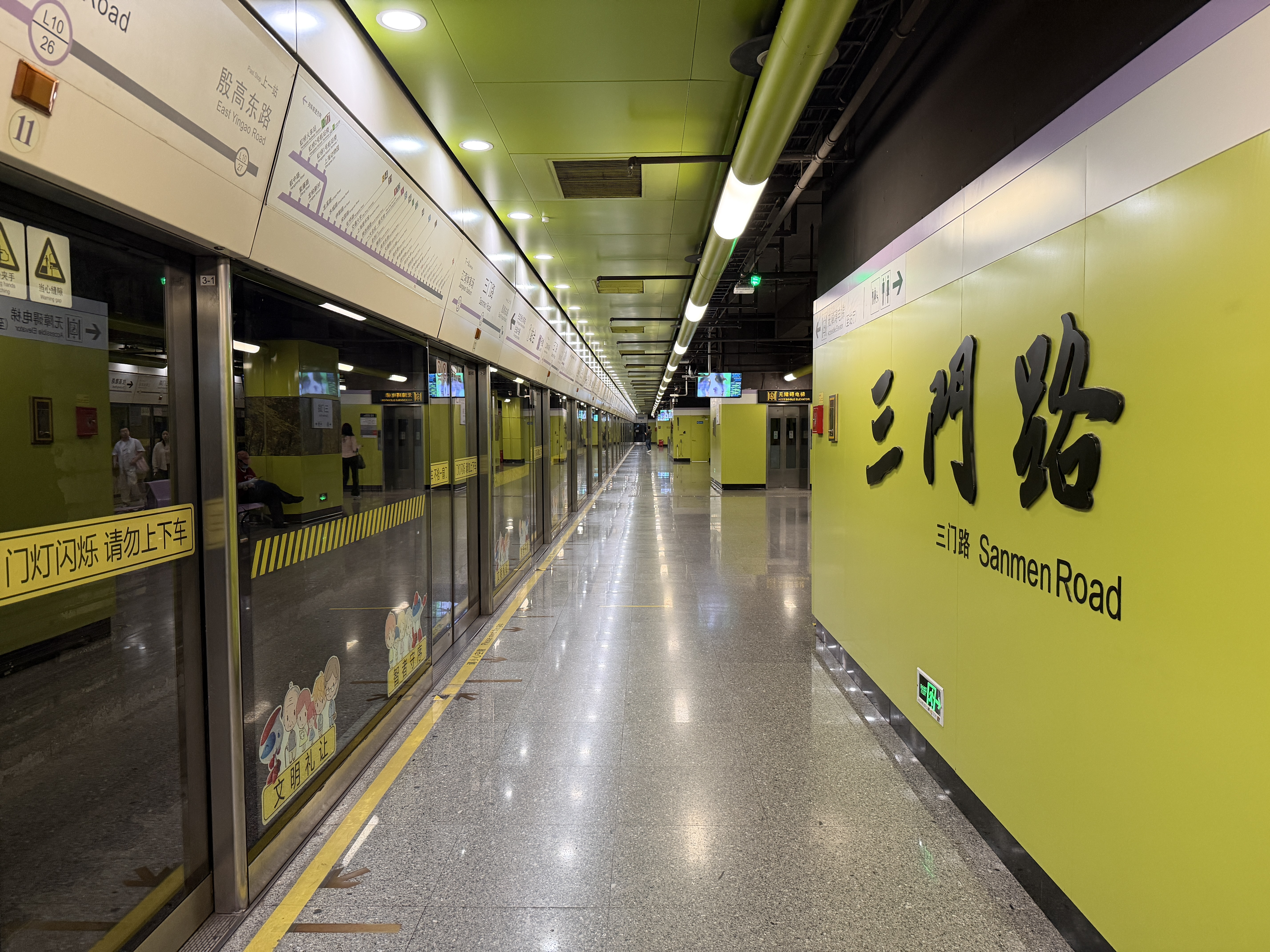
- Station platform

General information
- Location: Sanmen Road at Songhu Road and Zhayin Road; Yangpu District, Shanghai; China
- Coordinates: 31.3153°N 121.503°E
- Operated by: Shanghai No. 1 Metro Operation Co. Ltd.
- Line: Line 10
- Platforms: 2 (1 island platform)
- Tracks: 2

Construction
- Structure type: Underground
- Accessible: Yes

Other information
- Station code: L10/26

History
- Opened: 10 April 2010

Services
Preceding station	Shanghai Metro	Following station
Jiangwan Stadium towards Hongqiao Railway Station or Hangzhong Road	Line 10	East Yingao Road towards Jilong Road
Location

Sanmen Road (simplified Chinese: 三门路; traditional Chinese: 三門路; pinyin: Sānmén Lù) is a station on Line 10 of the Shanghai Metro. The station is located north of the intersection of Sanmen Road with Songhu Road and Zhayin Road in the city's Yangpu District. It opened with the first phase of Line 10 on 10 April 2010.

== History ==
The station opened for passenger trial operations on 10 April 2010, concurrent with the opening of the first phase of Line 10 between Xinjiangwancheng and Hangzhong Road. During passenger trial operations, the first and last trains at this station were 9:03 and 16:03 respectively, and all through trains at this station initially terminated at Xinjiangwancheng or Hangzhong Road. Full service with extended hours began on 3 July 2010.

With the opening of the segment of Line 10 between Longxi Road and Hongqiao Railway Station on 30 November 2010, Line 10 commenced services on two branches west of Longxi Road, and thus southbound trains departing this station (toward Jiangwan Stadium) either terminate at Hongqiao Railway Station or Hangzhong Road, while all northbound trains (toward East Yingao Road) continue to terminate at Xinjiangwancheng.

== Description ==
The station is located just north of the intersection of Sanmen Road with Songhu Road and Zhayin Road in the Yangpu District of Shanghai. An underground station, the station consists of three floors. From street level, passengers descend to a concourse level with fare gates, ticket machines, and a customer service counter. The platform level, which consists of a single island platform, is located one level beneath the concourse level. Toilets are available at the south end of the platform, within the fare-paid zone.

In addition, this station is fully accessible. An elevator connects the street level to the concourse level near Exit 3. Within the fare-paid zone, an elevator connects the concourse level to the platform level.

=== Exits ===
There are two opened exits of the station, numbered and signed as follows:

- Exit 3: Songhu Road, Zhayin Road (south side of the station)
- Exit 6: Songhu Road (north side of the station)

== Nearby landmarks ==
- Jiangwan Mosque
