= Shanghai Zoo station =

Shanghai Metro station

Shanghai Zoo 上海动物园
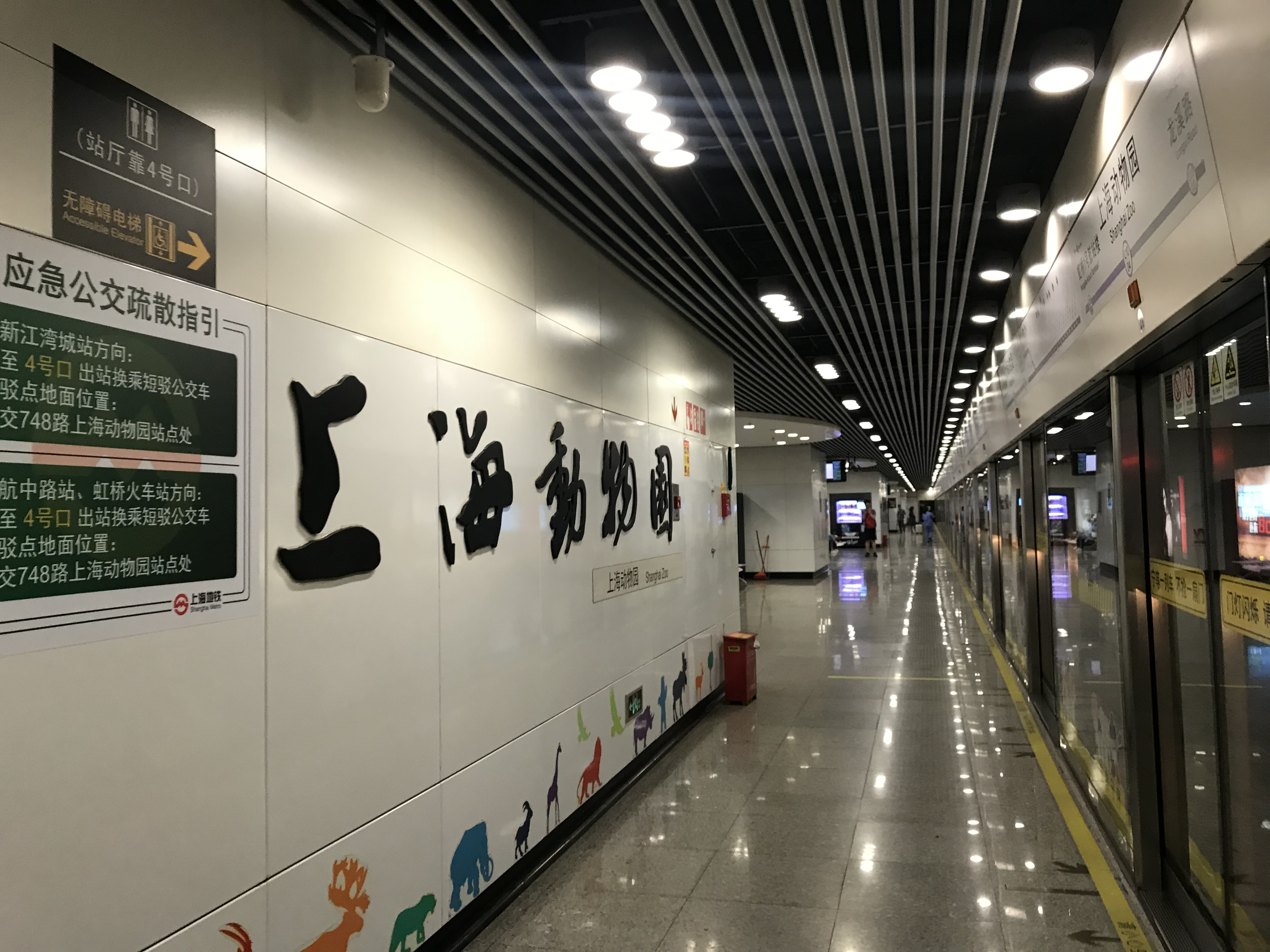
- Station platform

General information
- Location: Shanghai Zoo, Hongqiao Road; Changning District, Shanghai; China
- Coordinates: 31°11′32″N 121°21′47″E
- Line: Line 10
- Platforms: 2 (1 island platform)
- Tracks: 2

Construction
- Structure type: Underground
- Accessible: Yes

Other information
- Station code: L10/04

History
- Opened: 30 November 2010

Services
Preceding station	Shanghai Metro	Following station
Hongqiao Airport Terminal 1 towards Hongqiao Railway Station or Hangzhong Road	Line 10	Longxi Road towards Jilong Road
Location

Shanghai Zoo (Note: simplified Chinese: 上海动物园; traditional Chinese: 上海動物園; pinyin: Shànghǎi Dòngwùyuán) is a station on Line 10 of the Shanghai Metro, located in Changning District adjacent to the Shanghai Zoo. It opened in 2010.
