= North Sichuan Road station =

Shanghai Metro station

North Sichuan Road 四川北路
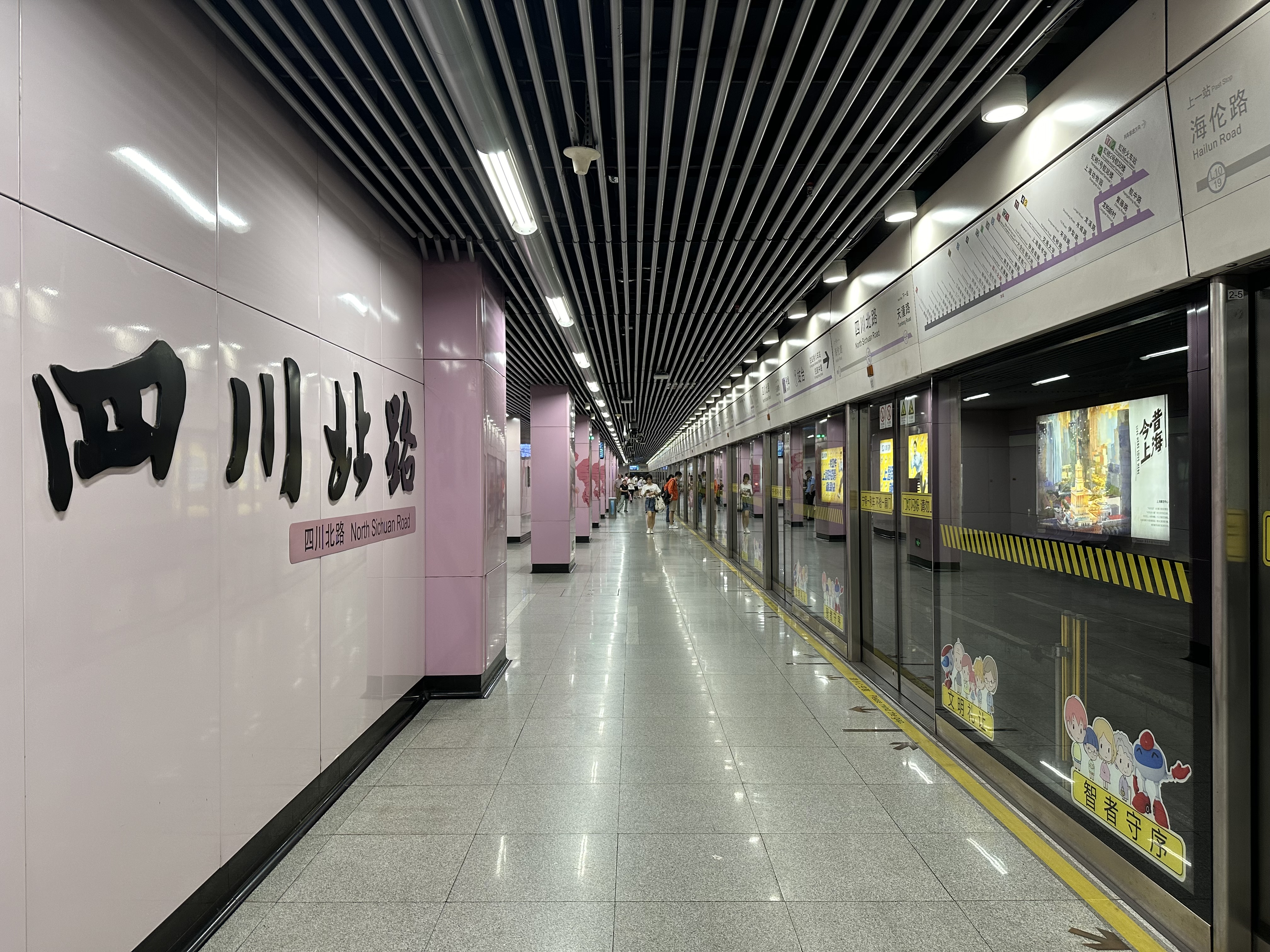
- Station platform

General information
- Location: North Sichuan Road and Wujin Road; Hongkou District, Shanghai; China
- Coordinates: 31.251956°N 121.483984°E
- Operated by: Shanghai No.1 Metro Operation Co. Ltd.
- Line: Line 10
- Platforms: 2 (2 side platforms)
- Tracks: 2

Construction
- Structure type: Underground
- Accessible: Yes

Other information
- Station code: L10/18

History
- Opened: 10 April 2010

Services
Preceding station	Shanghai Metro	Following station
Tiantong Road towards Hongqiao Railway Station or Hangzhong Road	Line 10	Hailun Road towards Jilong Road
Location

North Sichuan Road (Chinese: 四川北路; pinyin: Sìchuān Běi Lù) is a station on Line 10 of the Shanghai Metro. It began operation on 10 April 2010 and is located on North Sichuan Road.
