= Songyuan Road station =

Shanghai Metro station

Songyuan Road 宋园路
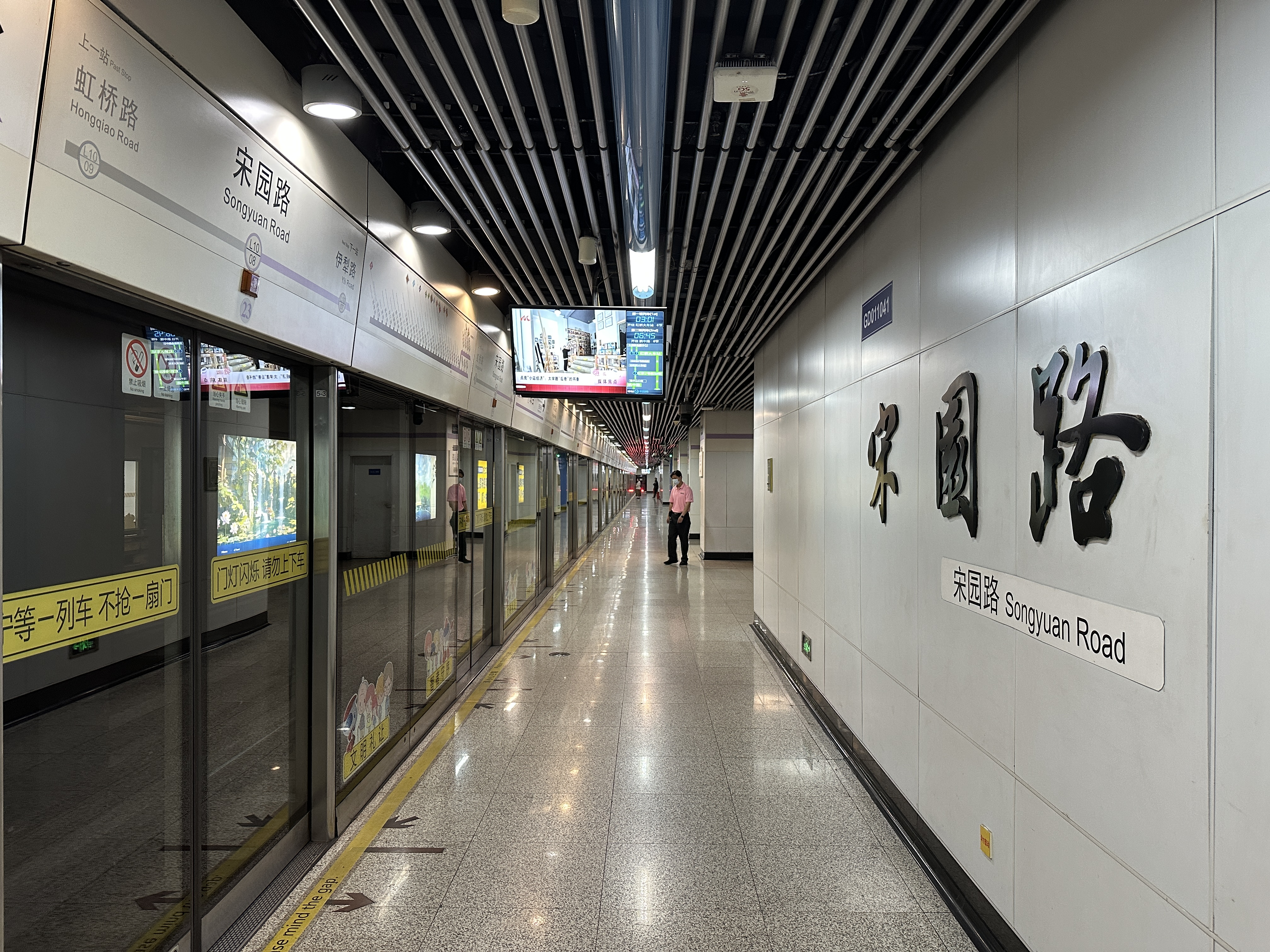
- Side platform for Hongqiao Railway Station or Hangzhong Road-bound trains

General information
- Location: Hongqiao Road and Songyuan Road (宋园路); Changning District, Shanghai; China
- Coordinates: 31°11′54″N 121°24′26″E
- Operated by: Shanghai No. 1 Metro Operation Co. Ltd.
- Line: Line 10
- Platforms: 2 (2 side platforms)
- Tracks: 2

Construction
- Structure type: Underground
- Accessible: Yes

Other information
- Station code: L10/08

History
- Opened: 10 April 2010

Services
Preceding station	Shanghai Metro	Following station
Yili Road towards Hongqiao Railway Station or Hangzhong Road	Line 10	Hongqiao Road towards Jilong Road
Location

Songyuan Road (simplified Chinese: 宋园路; traditional Chinese: 宋園路; pinyin: Sòngyuán Lù) is a station on Line 10 of the Shanghai Metro. It began operation on 10 April 2010.
