= Siping Road station =

Shanghai Metro interchange station

Siping Road 四平路
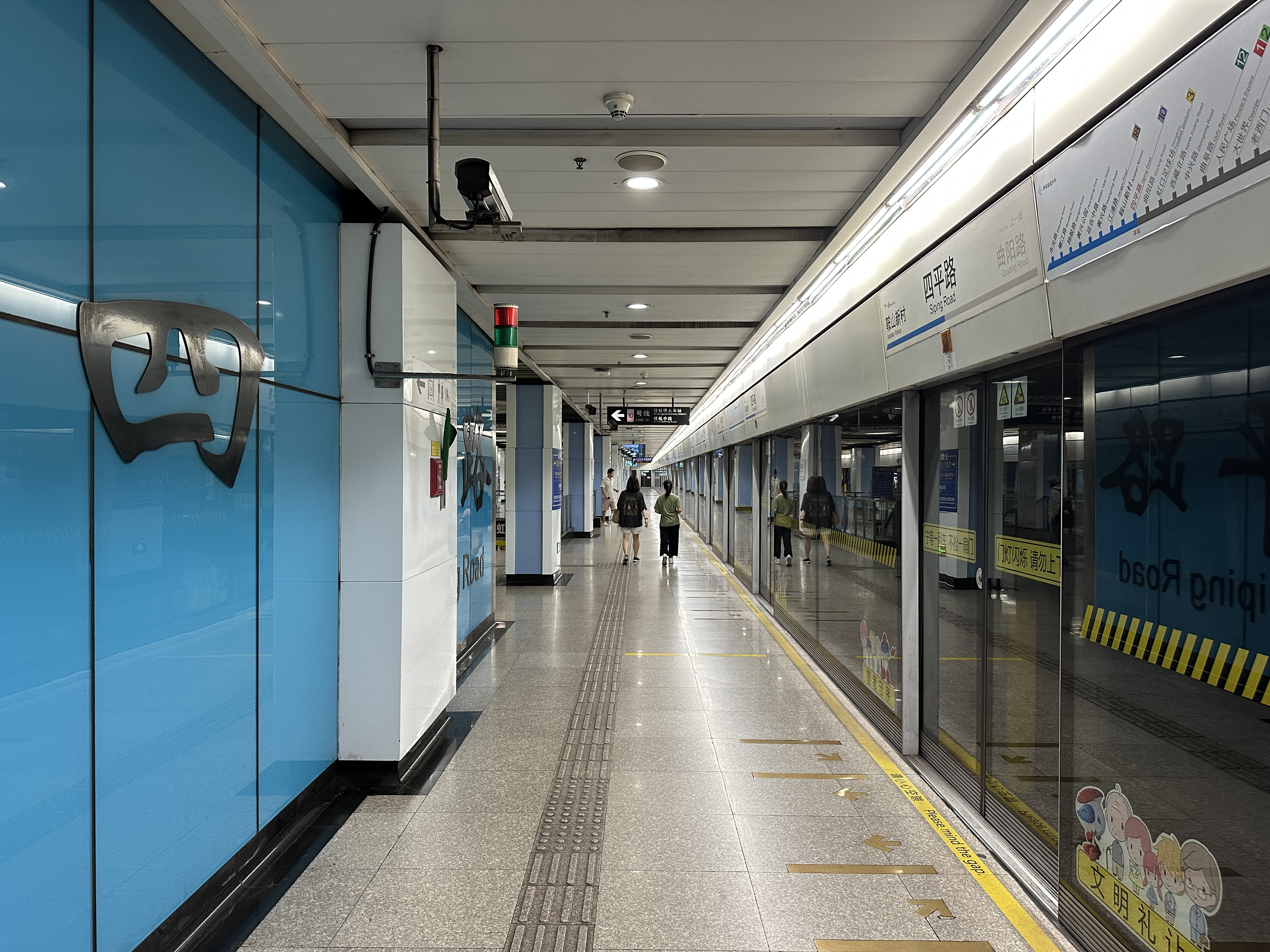
- Line 8 platform

General information
- Location: Shanghai; China
- Coordinates: 31.2769°N 121.497°E
- Operated by: Shanghai No. 1/4 Metro Operation Co. Ltd.
- Lines: Line 8; Line 10
- Platforms: 4 (1 island platform for Line 8 and 2 side platforms for Line 10)
- Tracks: 4

Construction
- Structure type: Underground
- Accessible: Yes

Other information
- Station code: L10/21 (Line 10)

History
- Opened: 29 December 2007 (Line 8); 10 April 2010 (Line 10)

Services
| Preceding station | Shanghai Metro | Following station |
|---|---|---|
| Anshan Xincun towards Shiguang Road | Line 8 | Quyang Road towards Shendu Highway |
| Youdian Xincun towards Hongqiao Railway Station or Hangzhong Road | Line 10 | Tongji University towards Jilong Road |
Location

Siping Road (Chinese: 四平路; pinyin: Sìpíng Lù) is an interchange station between Lines 8 and 10 on the Shanghai Metro. It began operation on 29 December 2007. It became an interchange with Line 10 when it opened on 10 April 2010.

The station is located on the boundary between Yangpu District and Hongkou District in Shanghai.

== Station Layout ==
| G | Entrances and Exits | Exits 1-4 |
| B1 | Concourse | Faregates, Station Agent |
| B2 | Northbound | ← Line 8 towards Shiguang Road (Anshan Xincun) |
| B2 | Island platform, doors open on the left |
| B2 | Southbound | Line 8 towards Shendu Highway (Quyang Road) → |
| B3 | Side platform, doors open on the right |
| B3 | Westbound | ← Line 10 towards Hongqiao Railway Station or Hangzhong Road (Youdian Xincun) |
| B3 | Eastbound | Line 10 towards Jilong Road (Tongji University) → |
| B3 | Side platform, doors open on the right |
