= Gaoqiao station =

Gaoqiao station (simplified Chinese: 高桥站; traditional Chinese: 高橋站; pinyin: Gāoqiáo Zhàn) may refer to:

- Gaoqiao station (Ningbo Rail Transit) in Ningbo, Zhejiang, China
- Gaoqiao station (Shanghai Metro), in Shanghai, China
- Gaoqiao station (Hangzhou Metro), in Hangzhou, Zhejiang, China

== See also ==
- Gaoqiao West station, another station in Ningbo
- West Gaoqiao station, another station in Shanghai
- Takahashi Station, Japanese romanization
