= Longxi Road station =

Shanghai Metro station

Longxi Road 龙溪路
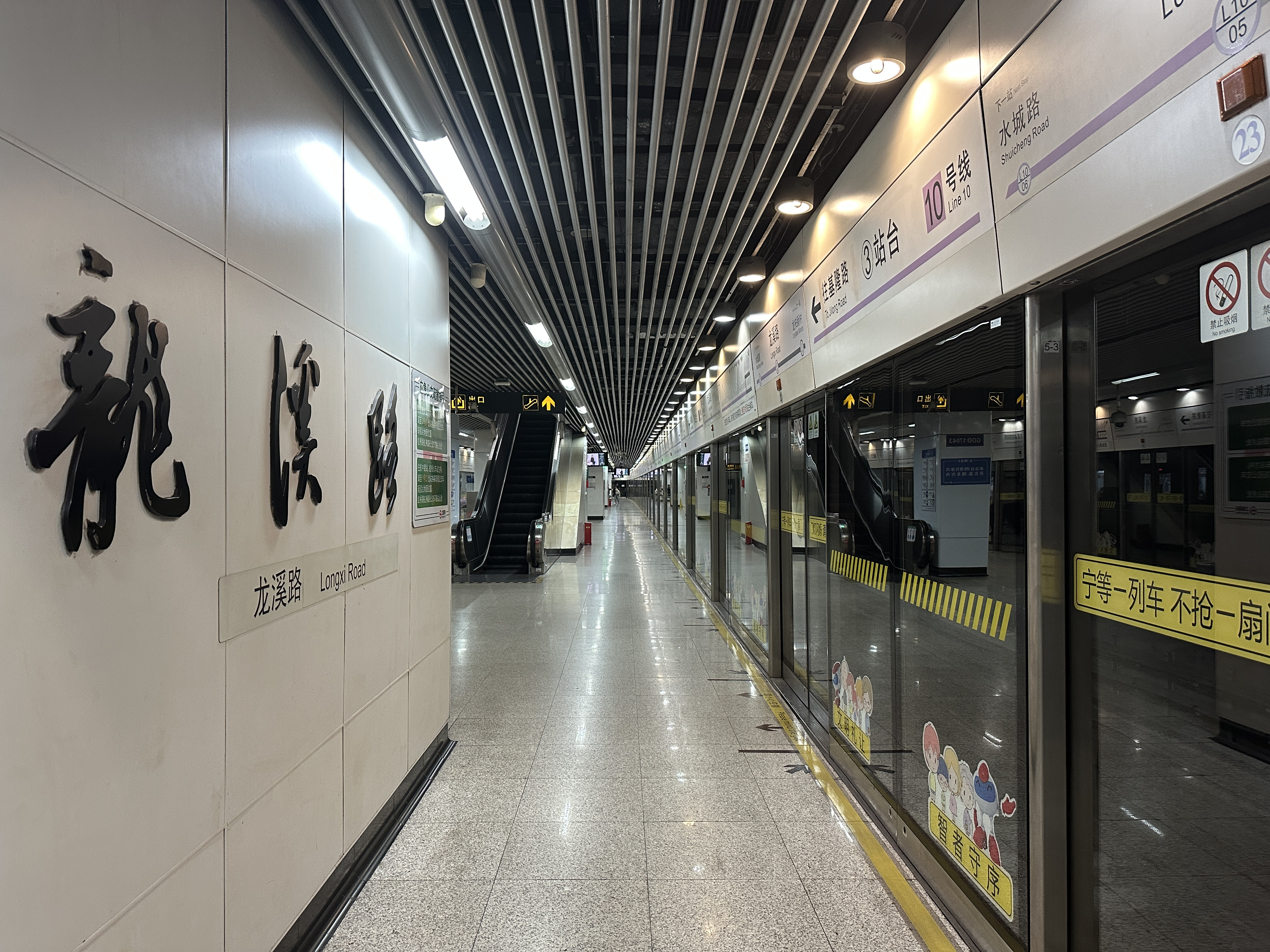
- Station platform

General information
- Location: Changning District, Shanghai; China
- Coordinates: 31°11′45″N 121°22′30″E
- Operated by: Shanghai No. 1 Metro Operation Co. Ltd.
- Line: Line 10
- Platforms: 3 (1 island platform and 1 side platform)
- Tracks: 3

Construction
- Structure type: Underground
- Accessible: Yes

Other information
- Station code: L10/05

History
- Opened: 10 April 2010

Services
Preceding station	Shanghai Metro	Following station
Shanghai Zoo towards Hongqiao Railway Station	Line 10	Shuicheng Road towards Jilong Road
Longbai Xincun towards Hangzhong Road	Line 10 branch	Shuicheng Road towards Jilong Road
Location

Longxi Road (simplified Chinese: 龙溪路; traditional Chinese: 龍溪路; pinyin: Longxi Lù) is a station on Line 10 of the Shanghai Metro. The station began operation on 10 April 2010. It is the last station westbound before Line 10 splits into two branches.
