= Hongqiao Airport Terminal 1 station =

Shanghai Metro station

Hongqiao Airport Terminal 1 虹桥1号航站楼
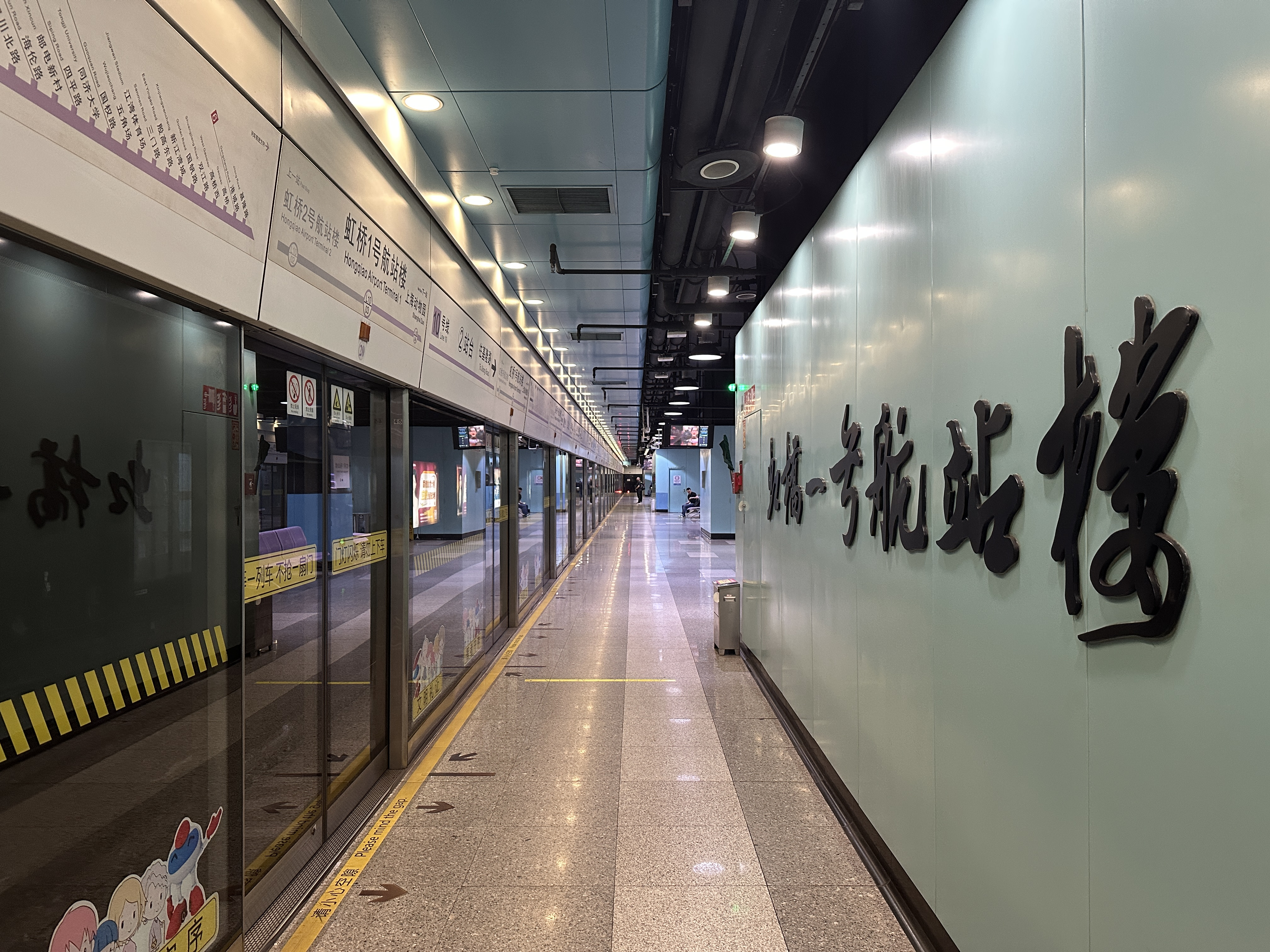
- Station platform

General information
- Location: Hongqiao Airport Terminal 1, Changning District, Shanghai; China
- Coordinates: 31.1933°N 121.342°E
- Operated by: Shanghai No. 1 Metro Operation Co. Ltd.
- Line: Line 10
- Platforms: 2 (1 island platform)
- Tracks: 2
- Connections: Hongqiao Airport (SHA)

Construction
- Structure type: Underground
- Accessible: Yes

Other information
- Station code: L10/03

History
- Opened: 30 November 2010

Services
Preceding station	Shanghai Metro	Following station
Hongqiao Airport Terminal 2 towards Hongqiao Railway Station	Line 10	Shanghai Zoo towards Jilong Road
Location

Hongqiao Airport Terminal 1 (simplified Chinese: 虹桥1号航站楼; traditional Chinese: 虹橋1號航站樓; pinyin: Hóngqiáo Yīhào Hángzhànlóu) is a station on Line 10 of the Shanghai Metro. It is located south of Terminal 1 of Hongqiao International Airport.
