= Tongji University station =

Shanghai Metro station

Tongji University 同济大学
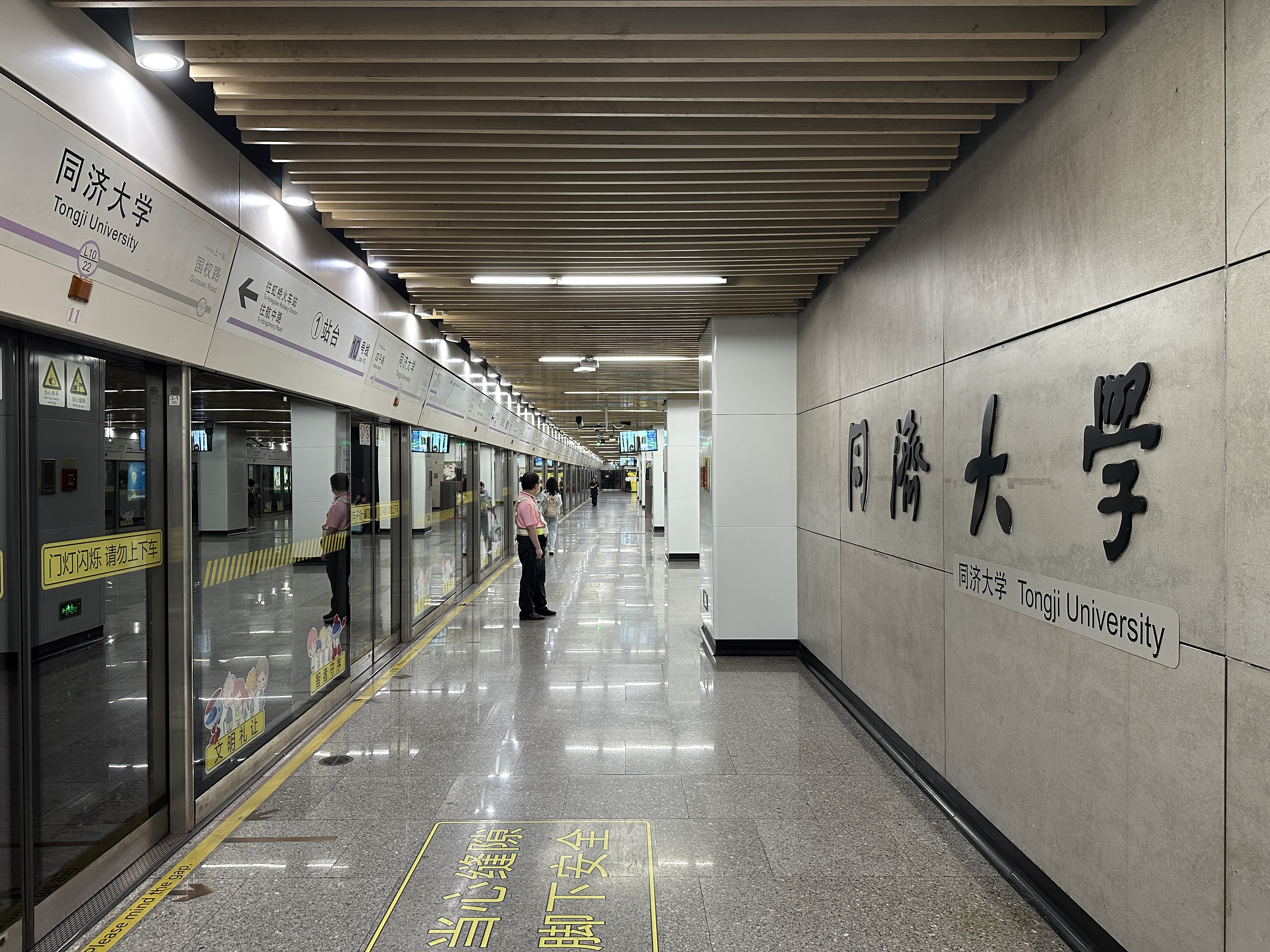
- Station platform

General information
- Location: Siping Road and Guokang Road (国康路); Yangpu District, Shanghai; China
- Coordinates: 31°17′4″N 121°30′8″E
- Operated by: Shanghai No.1 Metro Operation Co. Ltd.
- Line: Line 10
- Platforms: 2 (1 island platform)
- Tracks: 2

Construction
- Structure type: Underground
- Accessible: Yes

Other information
- Station code: L10/22

History
- Opened: 10 April 2010

Services
| Preceding station | Shanghai Metro | Following station |
|---|---|---|
| Siping Road towards Hongqiao Railway Station or Hangzhong Road | Line 10 | Guoquan Road towards Jilong Road |
Location

Tongji University (simplified Chinese: 同济大学; traditional Chinese: 同濟大學; pinyin: Tóngjì Dàxué), is a station on Line 10 of the Shanghai Metro. It began operation on 10 April 2010. It is named after the nearby Tongji University.
