= Youdian Xincun station =

Shanghai Metro station

Youdian Xincun 邮电新村
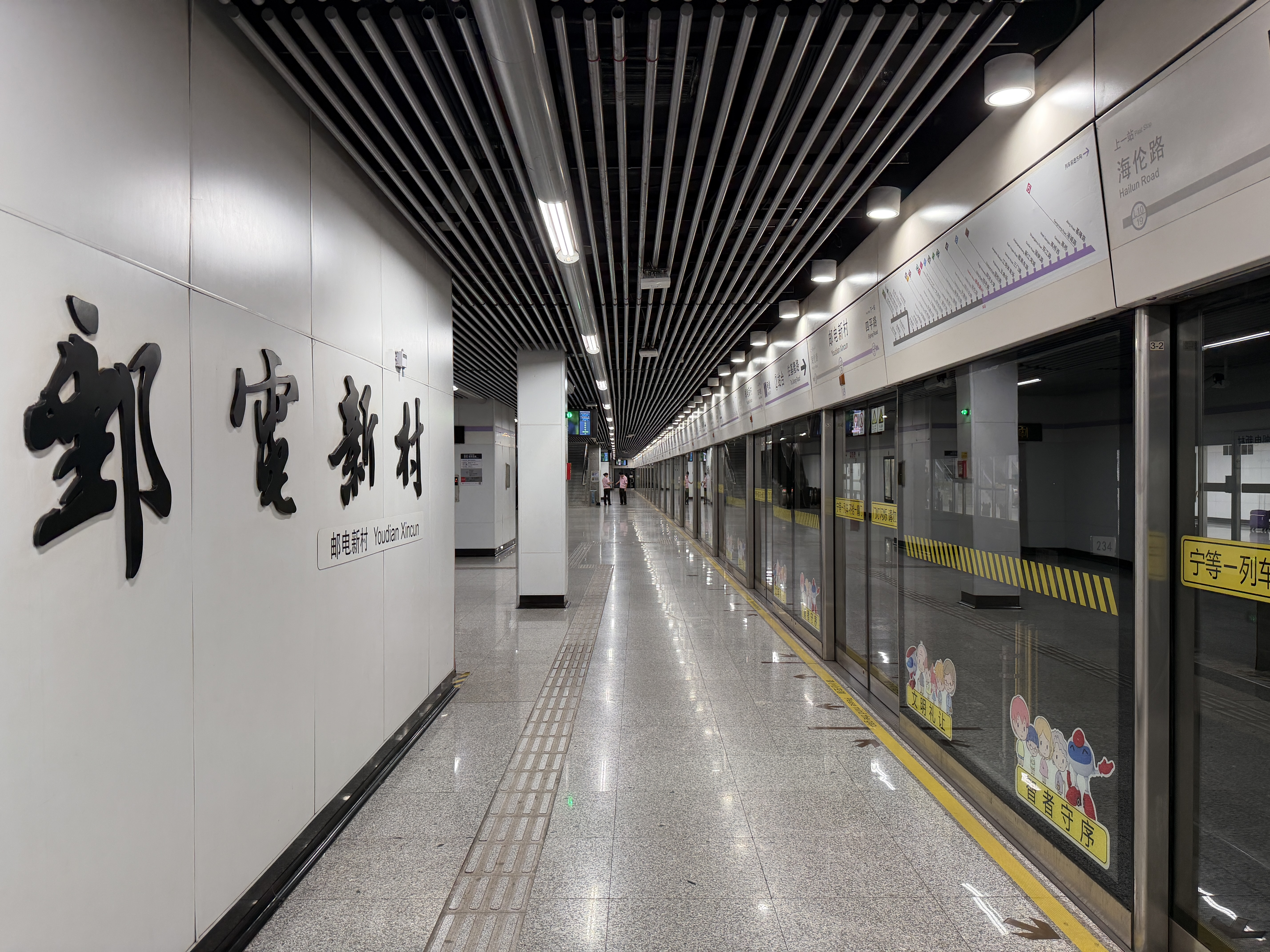
- Station platform

General information
- Location: Siping Road and Quyang Road (曲阳路); Hongkou District, Shanghai; China
- Coordinates: 31°16′13″N 121°29′23″E
- Operated by: Shanghai No. 1 Metro Operation Co. Ltd.
- Line: Line 10
- Platforms: 2 (2 side platforms)
- Tracks: 2

Construction
- Structure type: Underground
- Accessible: Yes

Other information
- Station code: L10/20

History
- Opened: 10 April 2010

Services
Preceding station	Shanghai Metro	Following station
Hailun Road towards Hongqiao Railway Station or Hangzhong Road	Line 10	Siping Road towards Jilong Road
Location

Youdian Xincun (simplified Chinese: 邮电新村; traditional Chinese: 郵電新村; pinyin: Yóudiàn Xīncūn) is a station on Line 10 of the Shanghai Metro. It began operation on 10 April 2010. It is located at Siping Road and Quyang Road.
