= Gaoqiao station (Shanghai Metro) =

Shanghai Metro station

Gaoqiao 高桥
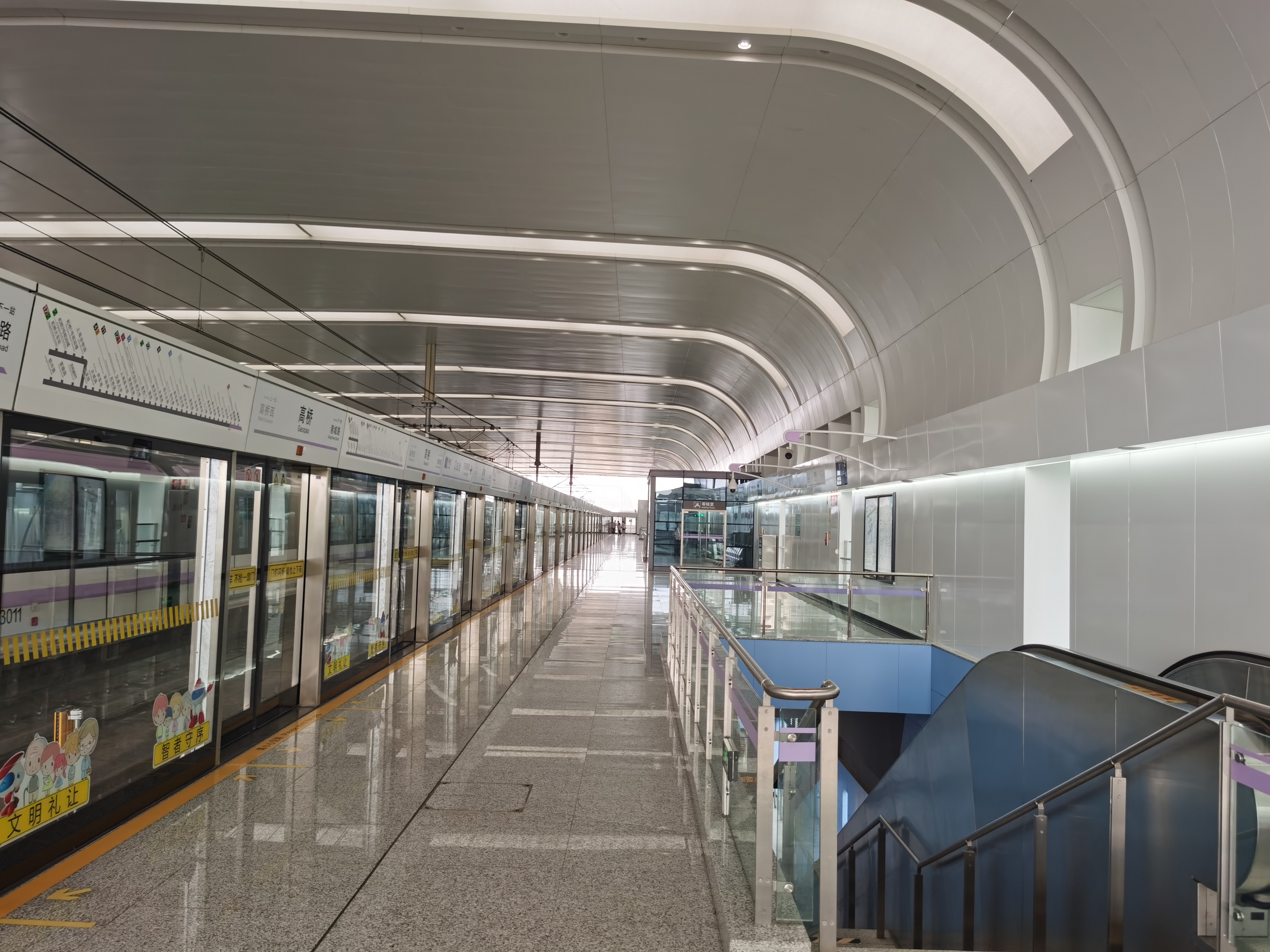
- Platform towards Jilong Road

General information
- Location: East of North Pudong Road and Gangcheng Road; Gaoqiao, Pudong, Shanghai; China
- Coordinates: 31.354714°N 121.558645°E
- Operated by: Shanghai No. 1 Metro Operation Co. Ltd.
- Line: Line 10
- Platforms: 2 (2 side platforms)
- Tracks: 2

Construction
- Structure type: Elevated
- Accessible: Yes

Other information
- Station code: L10/32

History
- Opened: 26 December 2020

Services
Preceding station	Shanghai Metro	Following station
West Gaoqiao towards Hongqiao Railway Station or Hangzhong Road	Line 10	Gangcheng Road towards Jilong Road
Location

Gaoqiao (Chinese: 高桥; pinyin: Gāoqiáo) is a Shanghai Metro station located on Line 10 within the town of Gaoqiao in Pudong, Shanghai. Located east of the intersection of North Pudong Road and Gangcheng Road, it was scheduled to open with the rest of the northern extension of Line 10 in 2018, however, due to construction delays, the station opened on 26 December 2020. It is an elevated station with two side platforms.
