= West Gaoqiao station =

Shanghai Metro station

West Gaoqiao 高桥西
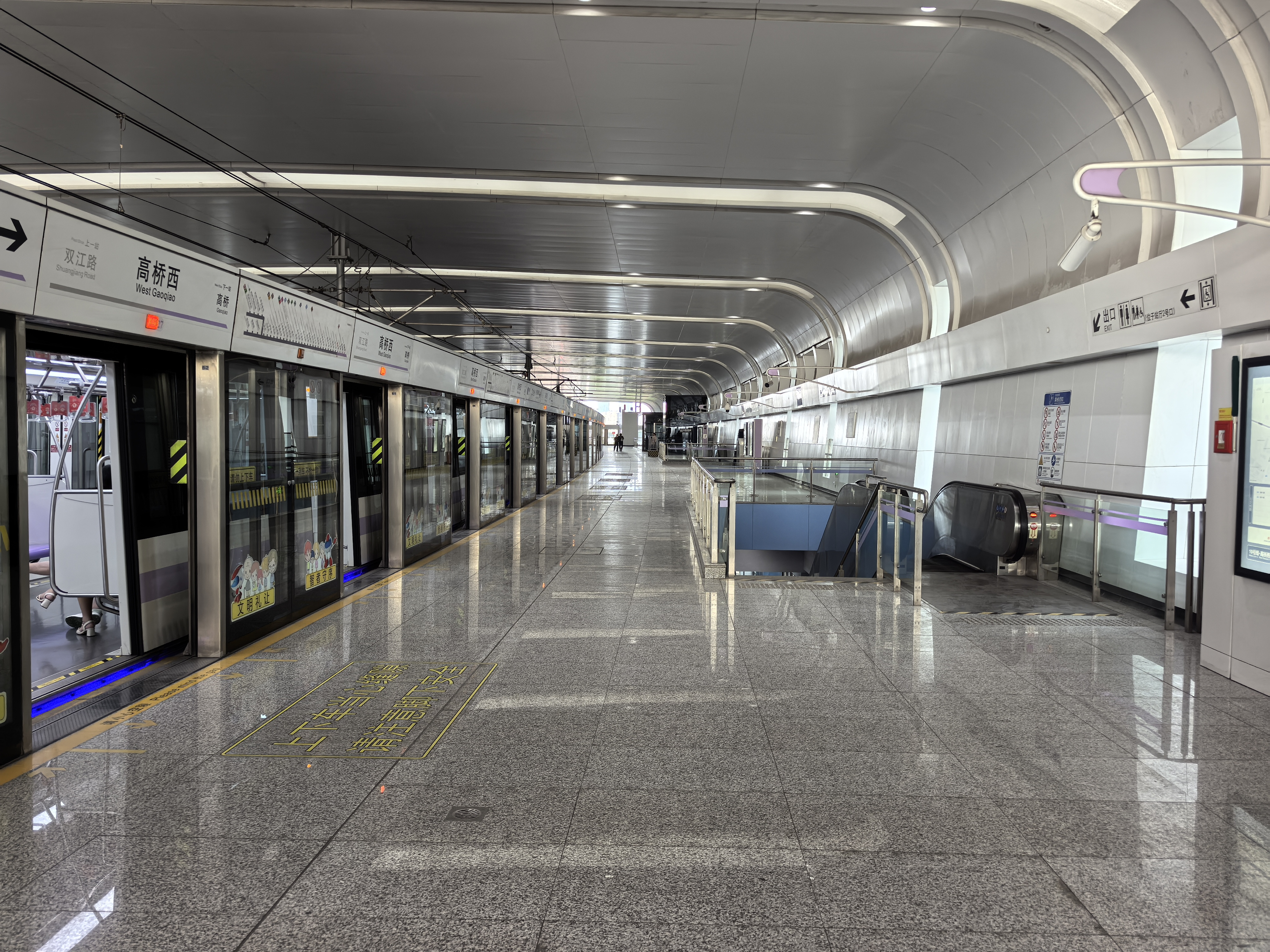
- Platform towards Jilong Road

General information
- Location: Zhonggao Highway and Gangcheng Road; Pudong, Shanghai; China
- Coordinates: 31.353580°N 121.545039°E
- Operated by: Shanghai No. 1 Metro Operation Co. Ltd.
- Line: Line 10
- Platforms: 2 (2 side platforms)

Construction
- Structure type: Elevated
- Accessible: Yes

Other information
- Station code: L10/31

History
- Opened: 26 December 2020

Services
Preceding station	Shanghai Metro	Following station
Shuangjiang Road towards Hongqiao Railway Station or Hangzhong Road	Line 10	Gaoqiao towards Jilong Road
Location

West Gaoqiao (Chinese: 高桥西; pinyin: Gāoqiáo Xī) is a Shanghai Metro station located on Line 10 within Pudong, Shanghai. Located near the intersection of Zhonggao Highway and Gangcheng Road, it was expected to open with the rest of the northern extension of Line 10 in 2018, however, due to construction delays, the station opened on 26 December 2020. It is an elevated station with side platforms.
