= Wujiaochang station =

Shanghai Metro station

Wujiaochang 五角场
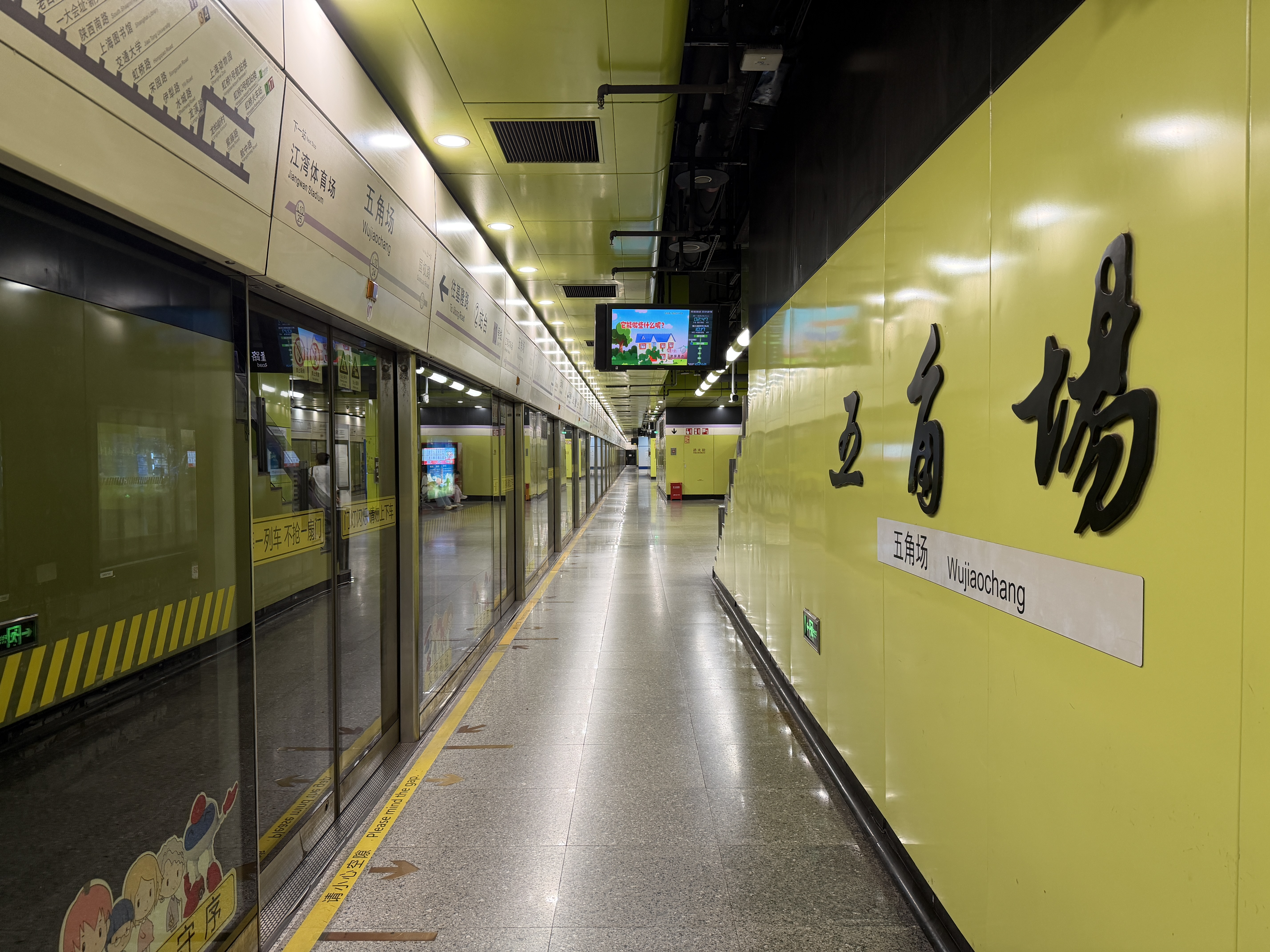
- Station platform

General information
- Location: Siping Road at Wujiaochang; Yangpu District, Shanghai; China
- Coordinates: 31°18′01″N 121°30′38″E
- Operated by: Shanghai No. 1 Metro Operation Co. Ltd.
- Line: Line 10
- Platforms: 2 (1 island platform)
- Tracks: 2

Construction
- Structure type: Underground
- Accessible: Yes

Other information
- Station code: L10/24

History
- Opened: 10 April 2010

Services
Preceding station	Shanghai Metro	Following station
Guoquan Road towards Hongqiao Railway Station or Hangzhong Road	Line 10	Jiangwan Stadium towards Jilong Road
Location

Wujiaochang (simplified Chinese: 五角场; traditional Chinese: 五角場; pinyin: Wǔjiǎochǎng) is a station on Line 10 of the Shanghai Metro. It is located on Siping Road just south of the Wujiaochang roundabout in the city's Yangpu District. The station began operation on 10 April 2010.
