= Ziteng Road station =

Shanghai Metro station

Coordinates: 31°10′16″N 121°21′34″E

Ziteng Road 紫藤路
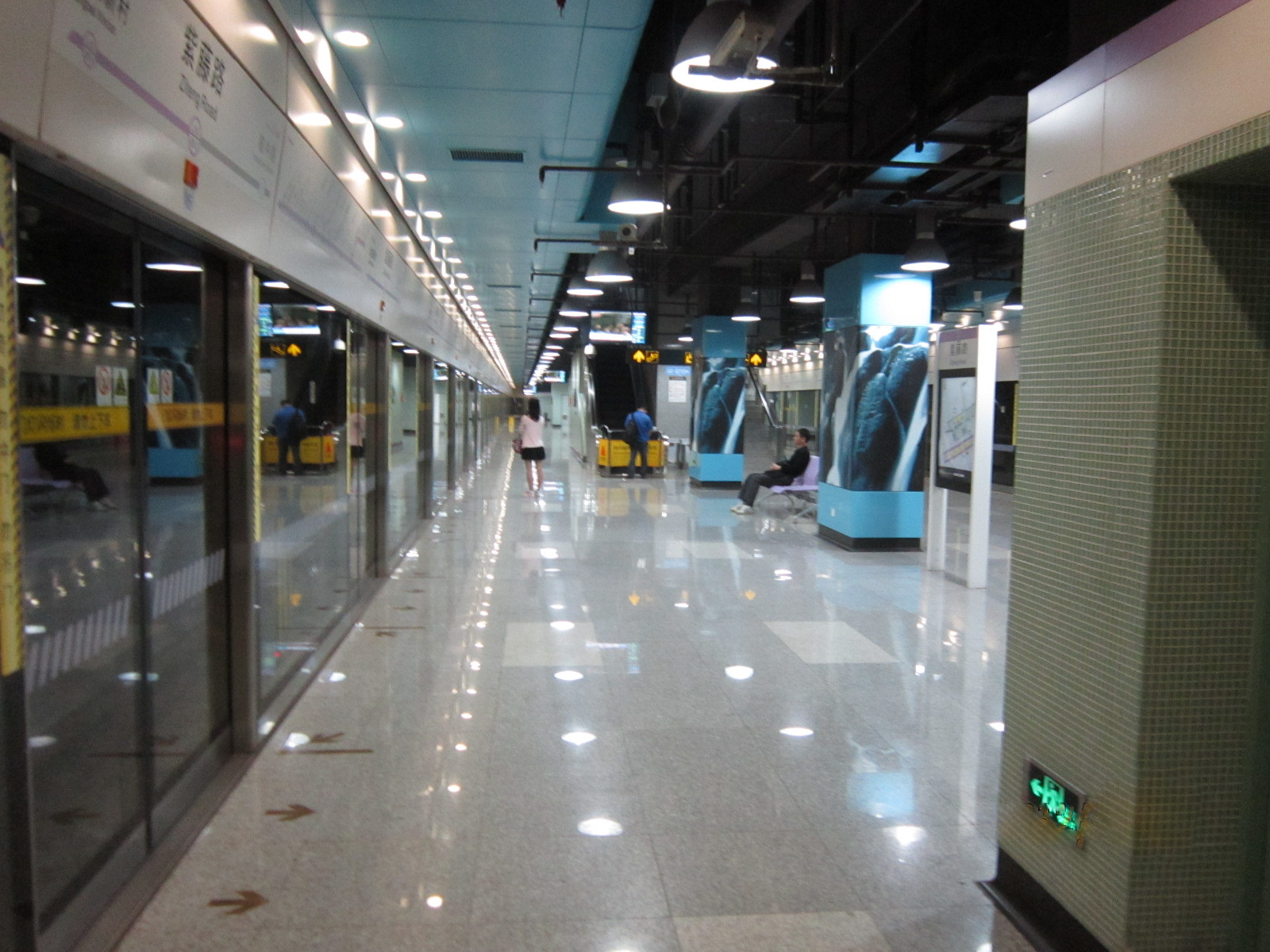
- Station platform

General information
- Location: Wuzhong Road (吴中路) and Ziteng Road (紫藤路); Minhang District, Shanghai; China
- Operated by: Shanghai No. 1 Metro Operation Co. Ltd.
- Line: Line 10
- Platforms: 2 (1 island platform)
- Tracks: 2

Construction
- Structure type: Underground
- Accessible: Yes

Other information
- Station code: L10/05-2

History
- Opened: 10 April 2010

Services
| Preceding station | Shanghai Metro | Following station |
|---|---|---|
| Hangzhong Road Terminus | Line 10 branch | Longbai Xincun towards Jilong Road |
Location

Ziteng Road (Chinese: 紫藤路; pinyin: Zǐténg Lù) is a station on the branch line of Line 10 of the Shanghai Metro. It is close to the Shanghai Metro Museum.
