= Wujiaochang =

Roundabout-centered area in Yangpu District, Shanghai, China

Wujiaochang (Chinese: 五角场, Shanghainese: Ng-koh-zan) is an area in Yangpu District, Shanghai, China. Wujiaochang means "five-cornered plaza", and the name originates from the area being centered on a roundabout of five roads. It is divided in half by the Middle Ring Road, which cuts straight above the roundabout. It is one of the ten designated business hubs in Shanghai.

== History ==
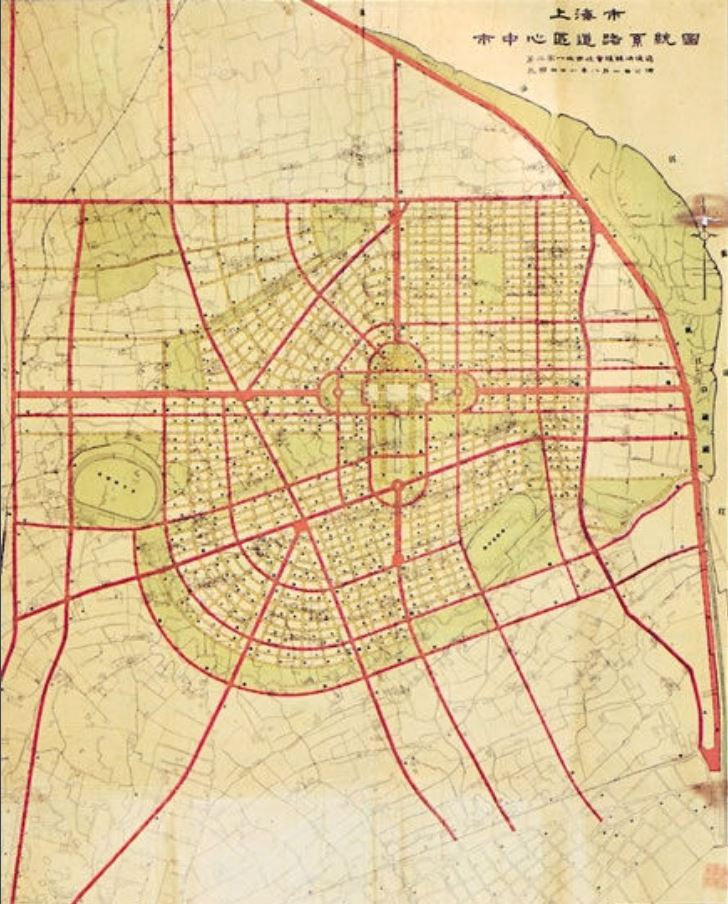
The plan of Wujiaochang in the 1930s

Wujiaochang was first created in the 1930s as the heart of the 'Great Shanghai' plan drawn up by the newly formed Republic of China. However, the Japanese Invasion of China in 1937 forced the construction to stop. When the war was over, the Chinese government was too poor to continue the project, so it was left to stand until the 21st century, when infrastructure and buildings were added and made the area a major business hub.

== Roads interchanging at Wujiaochang ==
As its name suggests, there are five roads interchanging at Wujiaochang. Those are (clockwise from north): Songhu Road (淞沪路) in the North, Xiangyin Road (翔殷路) in the east, Huangxing Road (黄兴路) in the southeast, Siping Road (四平路) in the southwest, and Handan Road (邯郸路) in the west. There are several universities located near Wujiaochang, including Fudan University, Tongji University and Shanghai University of Finance and Economics.

== Businesses ==
There are many businesses in Wujiaochang, such as the Wanda Plaza, Bailian Youyicheng Shopping Mall, Suning Electrical Appliances Market, Hopson One and Paris Spring, which makes Wujiaochang a fantastic shopping destination. In the 2000s, the central roundabout was renovated to contain an underground plaza that directly connects to all five streets and multiple aboveground and underground shopping malls at each street corner. It is possible to walk between Wujiaochang station and Jiangwan Stadium station on Line 10 of the Shanghai Metro without exiting the complex.

== See also ==
Xujiahui, a shopping area similar to Wujiaochang.
