= Xinjiangwancheng station =

Shanghai Metro station

Xinjiangwancheng 新江湾城
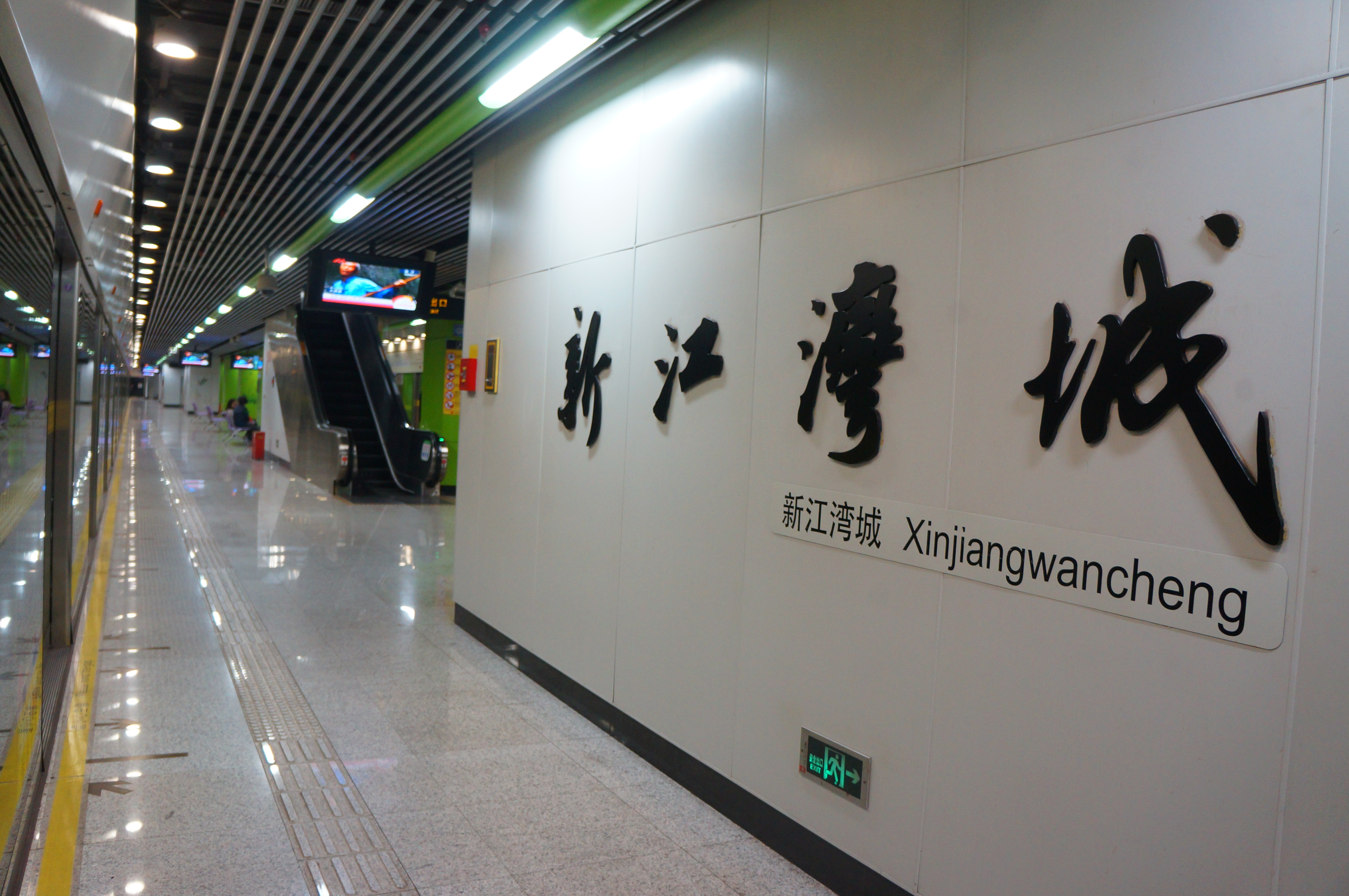
- Station platform

General information
- Location: Songhu Road (淞沪路) and Yinhang Road (殷行路); Yangpu District, Shanghai; China
- Coordinates: 31.3303°N 121.502°E
- Operator: Shanghai No. 1 Metro Operation Co. Ltd.
- Line: Line 10
- Platforms: 4 (2 island platforms)
- Tracks: 3

Construction
- Structure type: Underground
- Platform levels: B2
- Accessible: Yes

Other information
- Station code: L10/28

History
- Opened: 10 April 2010

Services
Preceding station	Shanghai Metro	Following station
East Yingao Road towards Hongqiao Railway Station or Hangzhong Road	Line 10	Guofan Road towards Jilong Road
Location
- Location within Shanghai

Xinjiangwancheng (simplified Chinese: 新江湾城; traditional Chinese: 新江灣城; pinyin: Xīnjiāngwānchéng; lit. 'New Jiangwan City'), is a Shanghai Metro station located on Line 10 in Yangpu District, Shanghai. Located at the intersection of Songhu Road and Yinhang Road, it is named after the nearby residential community of New Jiangwan City, which was built on the former Jiangwan Airport lands. It opened with the rest of the first phase of Line 10 on 10 April 2010. It served as the northern terminus of the line until 26 December 2020, when phase two of Line 10 opened, extending the line further north to Jilong Road station.

== Station layout ==
The station has three tracks, with four platforms on two islands. The central track is used for short-turn trains which terminate at Xinjiangwancheng station or westbound trains towards Hangzhong Road, while the tracks on either side of the station are used for through trains. Prior to the opening of phase 2 of Line 10, all trains used the central track and the southbound platform.

G	Entrances and exits	Exits 1-7
B1	Concourse	Fare gates, station agent
B2	Westbound	← Line 10 towards Hongqiao Railway Station (East Yingao Road)
B2	Island platform, doors open on the left, right
B2	Westbound/Eastbound	← Line 10 towards Hangzhong Road (East Yingao Road); Line 10 termination track →
B2	Island platform, doors open on the left, right
B2	Eastbound	Line 10 towards Jilong Road (Guofan Road) →
