= Jiangwan Stadium station =

Shanghai Metro station

Jiangwan Stadium 江湾体育场
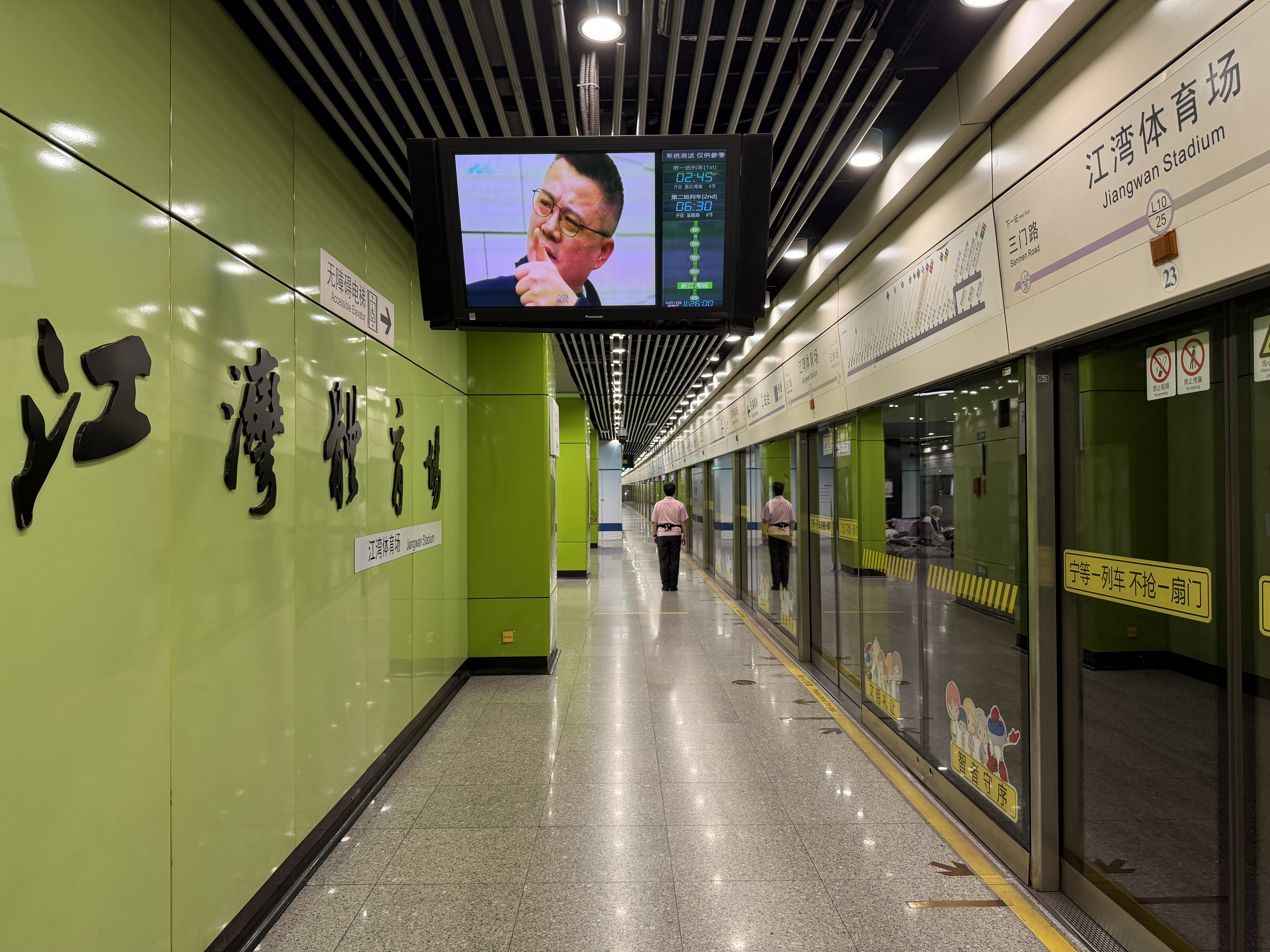
- Station platform

General information
- Location: Zhengtong Road (政通路) and Songhu Road (淞沪路); Wujiaochang Subdistrict, Yangpu District, Shanghai; China
- Coordinates: 31°18′21″N 121°30′34″E
- Operated by: Shanghai No. 1 Metro Operation Co. Ltd.
- Line: Line 10
- Platforms: 2 (1 island platform)
- Tracks: 2

Construction
- Structure type: Underground
- Accessible: Yes

Other information
- Station code: L10/25

History
- Opened: 10 April 2010

Services
Preceding station	Shanghai Metro	Following station
Wujiaochang towards Hongqiao Railway Station or Hangzhong Road	Line 10	Sanmen Road towards Jilong Road
Location

Jiangwan (simplified Chinese: 江湾体育场; traditional Chinese: 江灣體育場; pinyin: Jiāngwān Tǐyùchǎng) is a station on Line 10 of the Shanghai Metro. Located at the intersection of Zhengtong Road and Songhu Road in the city's Yangpu District, the station began operation on 10 April 2010. It is named after the nearby Jiangwan Stadium.

== Nearby landmarks ==
- Jiangwan Mosque
- Jiangwan Stadium

== See also ==
- Rail transport in China
