= Line 10 (Shanghai Metro) =

Metro line of the Shanghai Metro

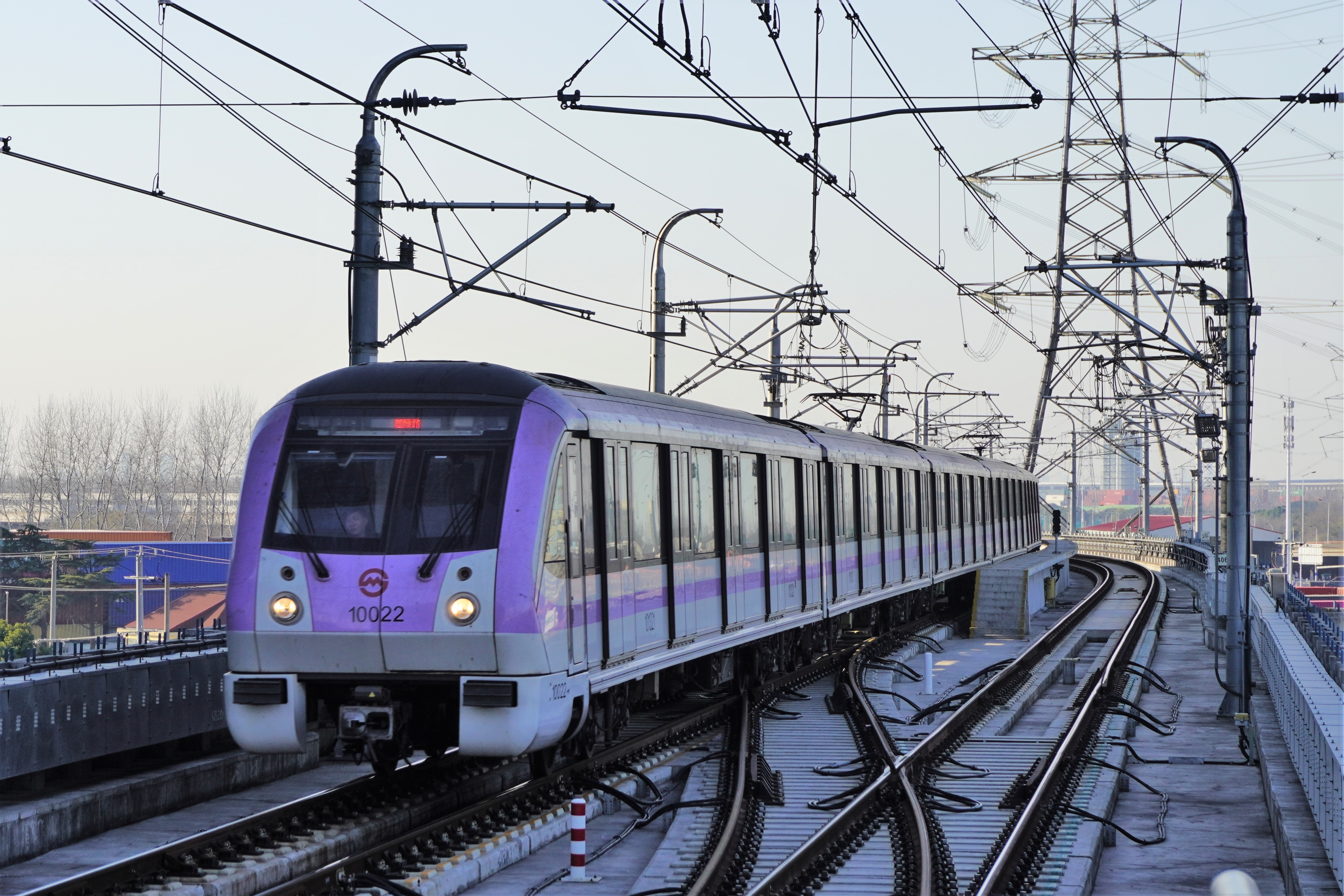
- An AC13 train at Jilong Road station

Overview
- Other names: M1 (planned name); Golden line (nickname)
- Native name: 上海地铁10号线
- Status: Operational
- Owner: Shanghai Rail Transit Line 10 Development Co., Ltd.
- Locale: Minhang, Changning, Xuhui, Huangpu, Jing'an, Hongkou, Yangpu, and Pudong districts, Shanghai, China
- Termini: Jilong Road; Hangzhong Road / Hongqiao Railway Station
- Stations: 37

Service
- Type: Rapid transit
- System: Shanghai Metro
- Operator(s): Shanghai No. 1 Metro Operation Co. Ltd.
- Depot(s): Wuzhong Road Depot; Gangcheng Road Yard
- Rolling stock: 10A01; 10A02
- Daily ridership: 1.085 million (2019 peak)

History
- Commenced: December 30, 2005; 20 years ago
- Opened: April 10, 2010; 16 years ago
- Last extension: December 26, 2020; 5 years ago

Technical
- Line length: 45 km (27.96 mi)
- Number of tracks: 2
- Character: Underground and elevated
- Track gauge: 1,435 mm (4 ft 8 1/2 in)
- Electrification: Overhead lines (1500 volts DC)
- Operating speed: 80 km/h (50 mph); Average speed: 31.8 km/h (20 mph)
- Signalling: ALSTOM/CASCO Urbalis 888 CBTC
Route map
Route on the Shanghai map:
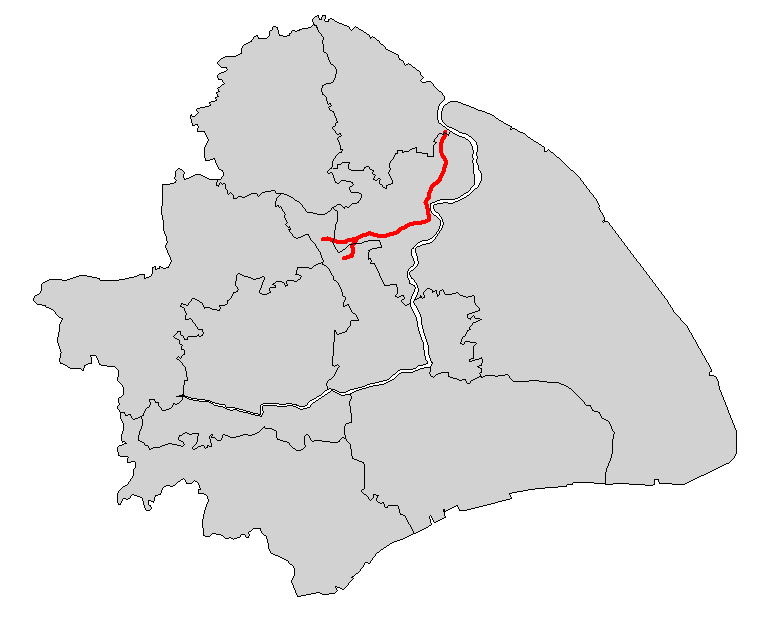
To scale geographic map:

Line 10 is a southwest–northeast line of the Shanghai Metro network that opened for service on April 10, 2010. The line runs from Jilong Road to Hongqiao Railway Station, with a branch line from Longxi Road to Hangzhong Road. It has been given the unofficial nickname “Golden Line” as it links many of the city's tourist attractions like Yuyuan and Xintiandi. It connects the Hongqiao International Airport with the downtown core of Shanghai, and also the dense residential districts of Yangpu and Hongkou. It is the only line in the system with numbered station codes. It is the first high-density and high-volume fully automatic subway line in mainland China, operating with GoA4 unattended train operation. The line is colored lilac on system maps.

== History ==
The first phase opened on 10 April 2010 and extended on 30 November 2010. The second phase of the line, a northern extension from Xinjiangwancheng to Jilong Road, which crosses underneath the Huangpu River and provide residents of northern Pudong with easier access to parts of Yangpu District and Hongkou District, opened on 26 December 2020.

Shanghai Metro Line 10 opening history
Segment	Commencement	Opened	Length	Station(s)	Name	Investment
Longxi Road — Xinjiangwancheng	11 May 2005	10 Apr 2010	24.76 km (15.39 mi)	24	Phase 1 (first section)	¥23.784 billion
Hangzhong Road — Longxi Road	11 May 2005	10 Apr 2010	4.84 km (3.01 mi)	3	Phase 1 (first section)	¥23.784 billion
Hongqiao Railway Station — Longxi Road	11 May 2005	30 Nov 2010	5.8 km (3.60 mi)	4	Phase 1 (second section)	¥23.784 billion
Xinjiangwancheng — Jilong Road	8 Jan 2015	26 Dec 2020	10.0 km (6.21 mi)	6	Phase 2	¥7.325 billion

== Stations ==
=== Service routes ===
Shanghai Metro Line 10 service routes
M - Mainline: Hongqiao Railway Station ↔ Jilong Road; B - Branch line: Hangzhong Road ↔ Xinjiangwancheng; C - Core: Longxi Road ↔ Jiangwan Stadium (operates only during AM peak); P - Partial Mainline: Hongqiao Railway Station ↔ Jiangwan Stadium; E - Extra trains: Hongqiao Railway Station ↔ Wujiaochang (limited stops) (Note: On Sunday to Thursday, there are two trains taking passengers from Hongqiao Railway Station (at 22:45 and 23:00) and airport after normal operation time and only stop at selected stations.)
Routes				Station №	Station name		Connections	Distance			Location	Open- ing	Plat- form
M	B	P	E	Station №	English	Chinese	Connections	km		min	Location	Open- ing	Plat- form
Mainline
●		●	●	L10/01	Hongqiao Railway Station	虹桥火车站	2 17 AOH	0.00	0.00	0	Minhang	30 Nov 2010	Underground Island
●		●	●	L10/02	Hongqiao Airport Terminal 2	虹桥2号航站楼	2 Airport Link (Note: Virtual transfer with line 2 – passengers who hold the Shanghai Public Transportation Card and transfer within 30 minutes of exiting the station are able to transfer to other lines without exiting the system. In-system cross-platform interchange available between eastbound trains toward Pudong Airport Terminal 1&2 and Jilong Road. However, with the help of spanish solution for platforms, it's the de facto case that westbound passengers of both lines 10 and 2 may transfer in-system by acrossing train doors. Out-of-system transfer with Airport Link Line.); SHA	0.56	0.56	2	Minhang	30 Nov 2010	Underground Island
●		●	●	L10/03	Hongqiao Airport Terminal 1	虹桥1号航站楼	SHA	1.93	2.49	5	Minhang	30 Nov 2010	Underground Island
●		●	｜	L10/04	Shanghai Zoo	上海动物园		1.96	4.45	8	Changning	30 Nov 2010	Underground Island
Branch
｜	●	｜	｜	L10/05-3	Hangzhong Road	航中路		1.03	5.48	0	Minhang	10 April 2010	Underground Island
｜	●	｜	｜	L10/05-2	Ziteng Road	紫藤路		1.19	6.67	3	Minhang	10 April 2010	Underground Island
｜	●	｜	｜	L10/05-1	Longbai Xincun	龙柏新村		2.38	9.05	6	Minhang	10 April 2010	Underground Island
Mainline
●	●	●	｜	L10/05	Longxi Road	龙溪路		1.27	10.32	10	Changning	10 April 2010	Underground Side & Island
●	●	●	｜	L10/06	Shuicheng Road	水城路		1.27	11.59	13	Changning	10 April 2010	Underground Island
●	●	●	｜	L10/07	Yili Road	伊犁路	(Note: Out-of-station virtual transfer between line 15 (Hongbaoshi Road) and line 10 (Yili Road). This transfer will be counted as two separate journeys requiring two fares.)	1.25	12.84	15	Changning	10 April 2010	Underground Island
●	●	●	｜	L10/08	Songyuan Road	宋园路		0.81	13.65	17	Changning	10 April 2010	Underground Side
●	●	●	◒	L10/09	Hongqiao Road	虹桥路	3 4	0.99	14.64	19	Xuhui	10 April 2010	Underground Island
●	●	●	｜	L10/10	Jiao Tong University	交通大学	11	1.27	15.91	21	Xuhui	10 April 2010	Underground Island
●	●	●	｜	L10/11	Shanghai Library	上海图书馆		1.18	17.09	24	Xuhui	10 April 2010	Underground Island
●	●	●	◒	L10/12	South Shaanxi Road	陕西南路	1 12	1.54	18.63	26	Huangpu	10 April 2010	Underground Island
●	●	●	｜	L10/13	Site of the First CPC National Congress · Xintiandi	一大会址·新天地	13	1.68	20.31	29	Huangpu	10 April 2010	Underground Side
●	●	●	｜	L10/14	Laoximen	老西门	8	0.86	21.17	31	Huangpu	10 April 2010	Underground Island
●	●	●	｜	L10/15	Yuyuan Garden	豫园	14	1.35	22.52	34	Huangpu	10 April 2010	Underground Island
●	●	●	◒	L10/16	East Nanjing Road	南京东路	2	1.17	23.69	36	Huangpu	10 April 2010	Underground Island
●	●	●	｜	L10/17	Tiantong Road	天潼路	12	0.71	24.40	38	Hongkou	10 April 2010	Underground Island
●	●	●	｜	L10/18	North Sichuan Road	四川北路		0.92	25.32	40	Hongkou	10 April 2010	Underground Side
●	●	●	◒	L10/19	Hailun Road	海伦路	4	0.92	26.24	42	Hongkou	10 April 2010	Underground Island
●	●	●	｜	L10/20	Youdian Xincun	邮电新村		1.19	27.43	44	Hongkou	10 April 2010	Underground Side
●	●	●	◒	L10/21	Siping Road	四平路	8	1.01	28.44	46	Hongkou	10 April 2010	Underground Side
●	●	●	｜	L10/22	Tongji University	同济大学		0.97	29.41	48	Yangpu	10 April 2010	Underground Island
●	●	●	｜	L10/23	Guoquan Road	国权路	18	0.84	30.25	50	Yangpu	10 April 2010	Underground Island
●	●	●	◒	L10/24	Wujiaochang	五角场		1.02	31.27	52	Yangpu	10 April 2010	Underground Island
●	●	●		L10/25	Jiangwan Stadium	江湾体育场		0.60	31.87	54	Yangpu	10 April 2010	Underground Island
●	●			L10/26	Sanmen Road	三门路		1.26	33.13	56	Yangpu	10 April 2010	Underground Island
●	●			L10/27	East Yingao Road	殷高东路		1.00	34.13	58	Yangpu	10 April 2010	Underground Island
●	●			L10/28	Xinjiangwancheng	新江湾城		0.79	34.92	60	Yangpu	10 April 2010	Underground Double Island
●				L10/29	Guofan Road	国帆路		1.54	36.46	62	Yangpu	26 Dec 2020	Underground Island
●				L10/30	Shuangjiang Road	双江路		3.25	39.71	67	Pudong	26 Dec 2020	Elevated Side
●				L10/31	West Gaoqiao	高桥西		1.35	41.06	69	Pudong	26 Dec 2020	Elevated Side
●				L10/32	Gaoqiao	高桥		1.20	42.26	71	Pudong	26 Dec 2020	Elevated Side
●				L10/33	Gangcheng Road	港城路	6	0.99	43.25	73	Pudong	26 Dec 2020	Elevated Side
●				L10/34	Jilong Road	基隆路		1.69	44.94	76	Pudong	26 Dec 2020	Elevated Side

=== Important stations ===
- Hongqiao Railway Station - located within Hongqiao Railway Station, interchange with lines 2 and 17.
- Hongqiao Airport Terminal 2 - located within Hongqiao International Airport, interchange with line 2 (Shanghai Public Transport Card required).
- Shanghai Zoo - Located near the Shanghai Zoo in Changning District.
- South Shaanxi Road - Interchange with lines 1 and 12, also the location of train guard changes.
- Site of the First CPC National Congress · Xintiandi - Located in the Xintiandi shopping area. Interchange with line 13
- Laoximen - Interchange with line 8.
- Yuyuan Garden - Located near the famous Yuyuan Garden. Interchange with line 14
- East Nanjing Road - Located under the pedestrianised Nanjing Road and close to The Bund. Interchange with line 2.
- Tongji University station - Located near the Tongji University.

=== Station name change ===
- In October 2006, Middle Henan Road was renamed as the East Nanjing Road (before line 10 began serving the station).
- On June 20, 2021, Xintiandi was renamed as the Site of the First CPC National Congress · Xintiandi.

== Headways ==
Shanghai Metro Line 10 headway
Time		Hangzhong Road - Longxi Road	Hongqiao Railway Station - Longxi Road	Longxi Road - Jiangwan Stadium	Jiangwan Stadium - Xinjiangwancheng	Xinjiangwancheng - Jilong Road
Monday - Friday (Working Days)
AM peak	7:30-9:00	About 9 min	About 4 min and 17 sec	Eastbound: 3 min Westbound: 2 min and 30 sec	4 min and 30 sec
Off-peak	9:00–17:30	About 12 min	About 6 min	About 4 min	About 6 min
PM peak	17:30–20:00	About 9 min	About 4 min and 30 sec	About 3 min	About 4 min and 30 sec
Other hours	Before 7:30 After 20:00	About 6 min - 14 min		About 5 min - 8 min	About 6 min - 12 min
Saturday and Sunday (Weekends)
Peak	7:00–22:30	About 10 min	About 6 min	About 3 min and 45 sec	About 5 min	About 10 min
Other hours	Before 7:00 After 22:30	About 6 - 14 min		About 5 - 8 min		About 6 - 12 min
Extended operation (Friday and Saturday)
	After 22:30		About 20 min

== Technology ==
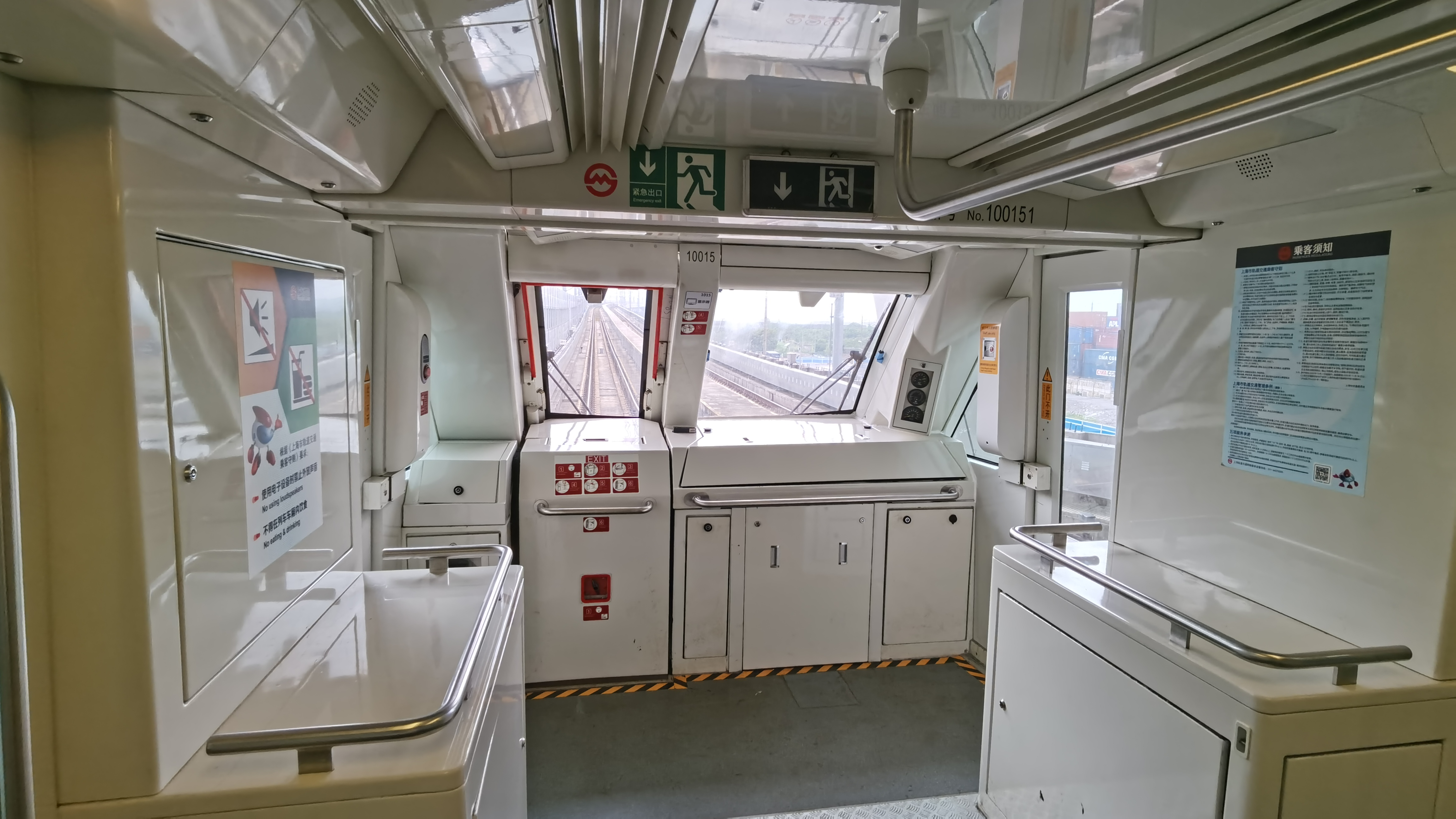
10A01 train with operator cabs removed in 2021

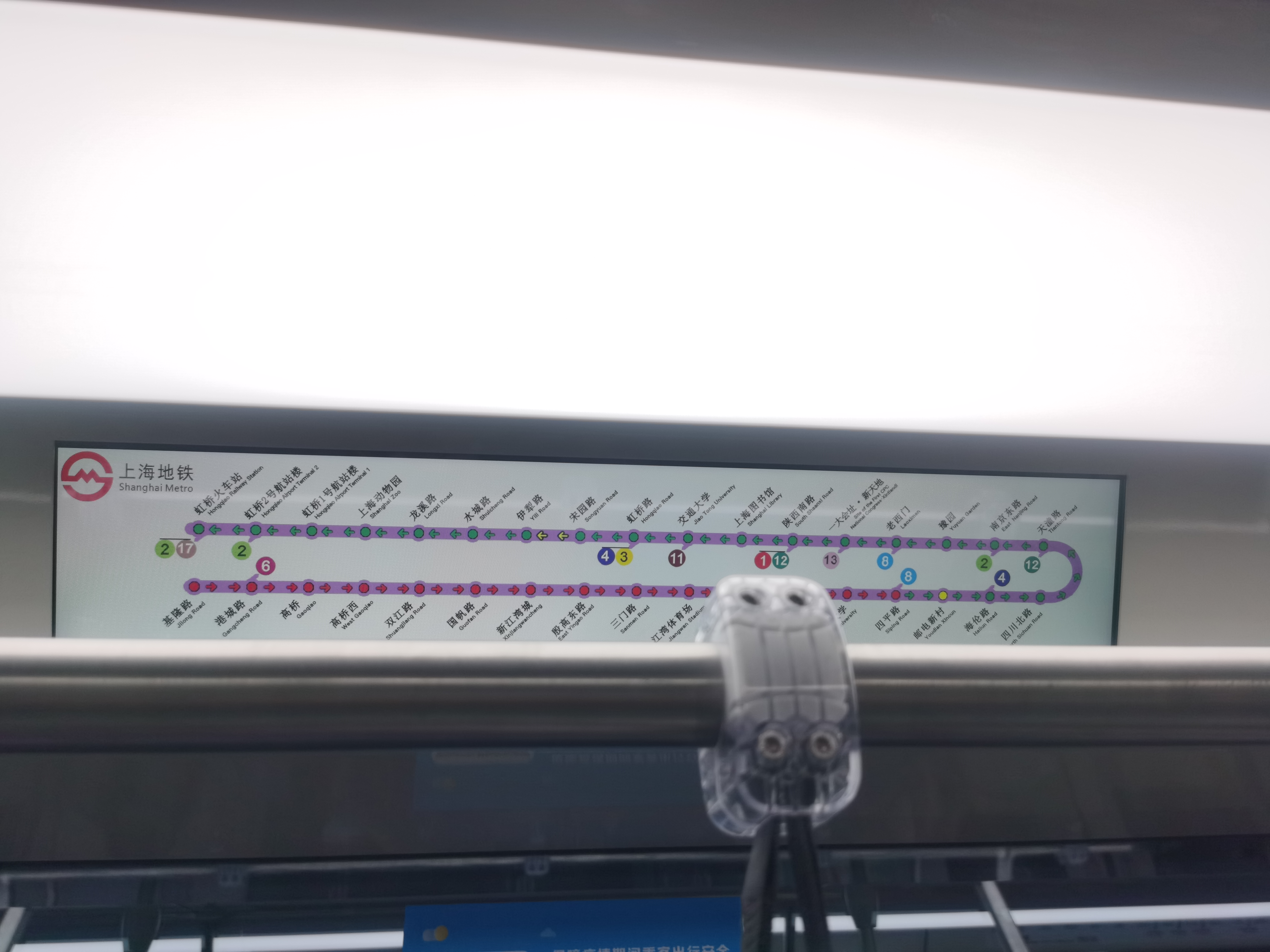
Retrofitted LCD passenger information screens on 10A02 trains

=== Signaling ===
Line 10 is one of the first lines in China capable of automatic train operation. However, upon opening it was operated with drivers on board. In 2020, the line started transitioning into GoA4 unattended train operation with driver cabs being gradually removed for the entire Line 10 fleet. Train guards are positioned at the front end of the train to oversee train operations and to drive the train manually in case of malfunction of the automatic train control system.

=== Rolling stock ===
Between December 2020 and January 2021, SATEE supplied its OptONIX and ONIX metro traction systems for 156 metro cars of Shanghai Line 10, with support from Xi'an Alstom Yongji Electric Equipment Co. Ltd (XAYEECO). It was also responsible for the train control monitoring system (TCMS) of Shanghai Line 10, and the line's train electrical design. During the same period, CASCO has successfully put into service its Urbalis 888 signalling solution on six of these metro lines in Chengdu and Shanghai.

The line uses 6-car Class A (Note: Class A carriage: 21-24m in length, 3.0m in width and 3.8m in height; Capacity: about 310 people.) trains.

Shanghai Metro Line 10 rolling stock
Fleet numbers	Manufacturer	Time of manufacturing	Class	No of car	Assembly (Note: Tc: Trailer with cab; Mp: EMU with pantograph; M: EMU without pantograph.)	Rolling stock	Number	Notes
246	Odd numbers: SATCO (Note: SATCO (Shanghai Alstom Transportation Equipment Co., Ltd.) is a joint venture between Alstom Metropolis and Shanghai Electric.); Even numbers: Nanjing Puzhen Rolling Stock Co., Ltd.	2009-2010	A	6	Tc+Mp+M+M+Mp+Tc	10A01	1001-1041 (100011-102461)	Between 26 December 2020 and the spring of 2022 the operator cabs have the wall of driver cab removed. Original name: AC13. 100251 and 100961 wrecked on September 27, 2011. They were repaired and returned to service.
104	Odd numbers: SATCO; Even numbers: Nanjing Puzhen Rolling Stock Co., Ltd.	2017-2019	A	6	Tc+Mp+M+M+Mp+Tc	10A02	10042-10067 (102471-104021)

== Incidents and Accidents ==
=== Construction incidents ===
There have been a number incidents during the construction of Line 10 but none lead to reported deaths or major injuries. On April 20, 2007, a crane on the Songyuan Road construction site collapsed into a five-story building causing some external damage. On June 25, 2008, during tunnel boring between Liyang Road and Quyang Road, a blowout occurred, letting water and sand enter the tunnel and creating minor sinkholes nearby. On July 21, at the intersection of South Shaanxi Road and Nanchang Road, Line 10 tunnel boring caused a sinkhole with a diameter of 1.8 meters (5 ft 11 in) and a depth of about 6 meters (19 ft 8 in) to appear. On May 18, 2009, a fire broke out on the construction site of Tongji University, covering an area of 100 square meters (1,100 sq ft) and burning down more than ten workers’ dormitories. No deaths were caused by this incident, as the workers were all evacuated in time. On January 6, 2010, a crane at Songyuan Road suddenly lost control during operation, causing a 5 meters (16 ft 5 in)-long boom to crash on the roofs of two construction vehicles.

=== 2011 collision ===
On September 27, 2011, at 14:37 local time, set 1005 collided with the stalled set 1016 between Yuyuan Garden station and Laoximen station, resulting in 271 injuries, 20 of which is serious. The cause was due to human error.
