= Hangzhong Road station =

Shanghai Metro station

Hangzhong Road 航中路
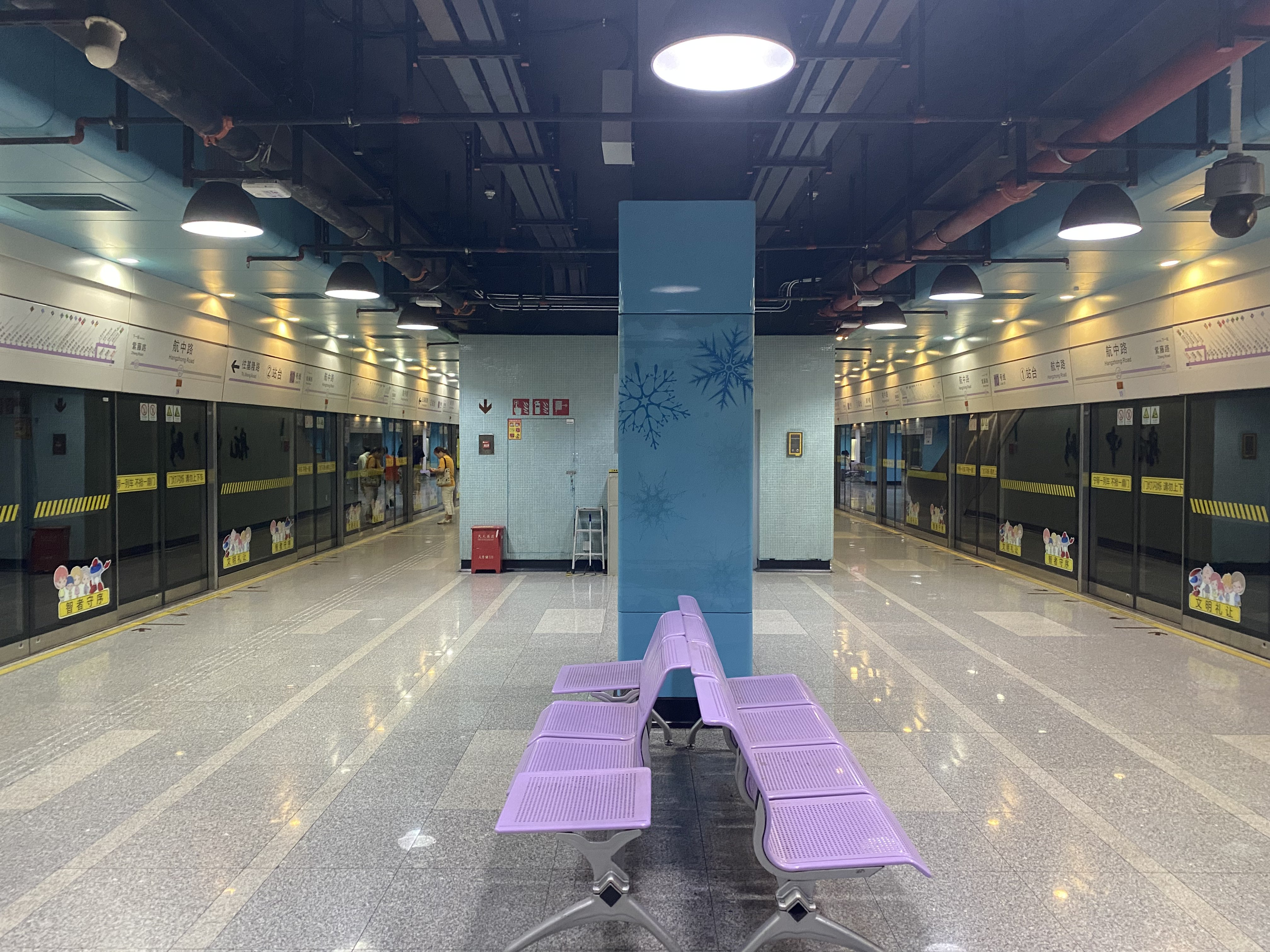
- Station platform

General information
- Location: Wuzhong Road (吴中路) and Hangzhong Road (航中路); Minhang District, Shanghai; China
- Coordinates: 31°10′01″N 121°20′57″E
- Operator: Shanghai No. 1 Metro Operation Co. Ltd.
- Line: Line 10
- Platforms: 2 (1 island platform)
- Tracks: 2

Construction
- Structure type: Underground
- Accessible: Yes

Other information
- Station code: L10/05-3

History
- Opened: 10 April 2010

Services
Preceding station	Shanghai Metro	Following station
Terminus	Line 10 branch	Ziteng Road towards Jilong Road
Location

Hangzhong Road (Chinese: 航中路; pinyin: Hángzhōng Lù) is a station on Line 10 of the Shanghai Metro. It began operation in April 2010 and is the western terminus of the branch line of Line 10.

This station has 2 platforms, but only one is in regular service.
