= Hongqiao Railway Station metro station =

Shanghai Metro interchange station

Hongqiao Railway Station 虹桥火车站
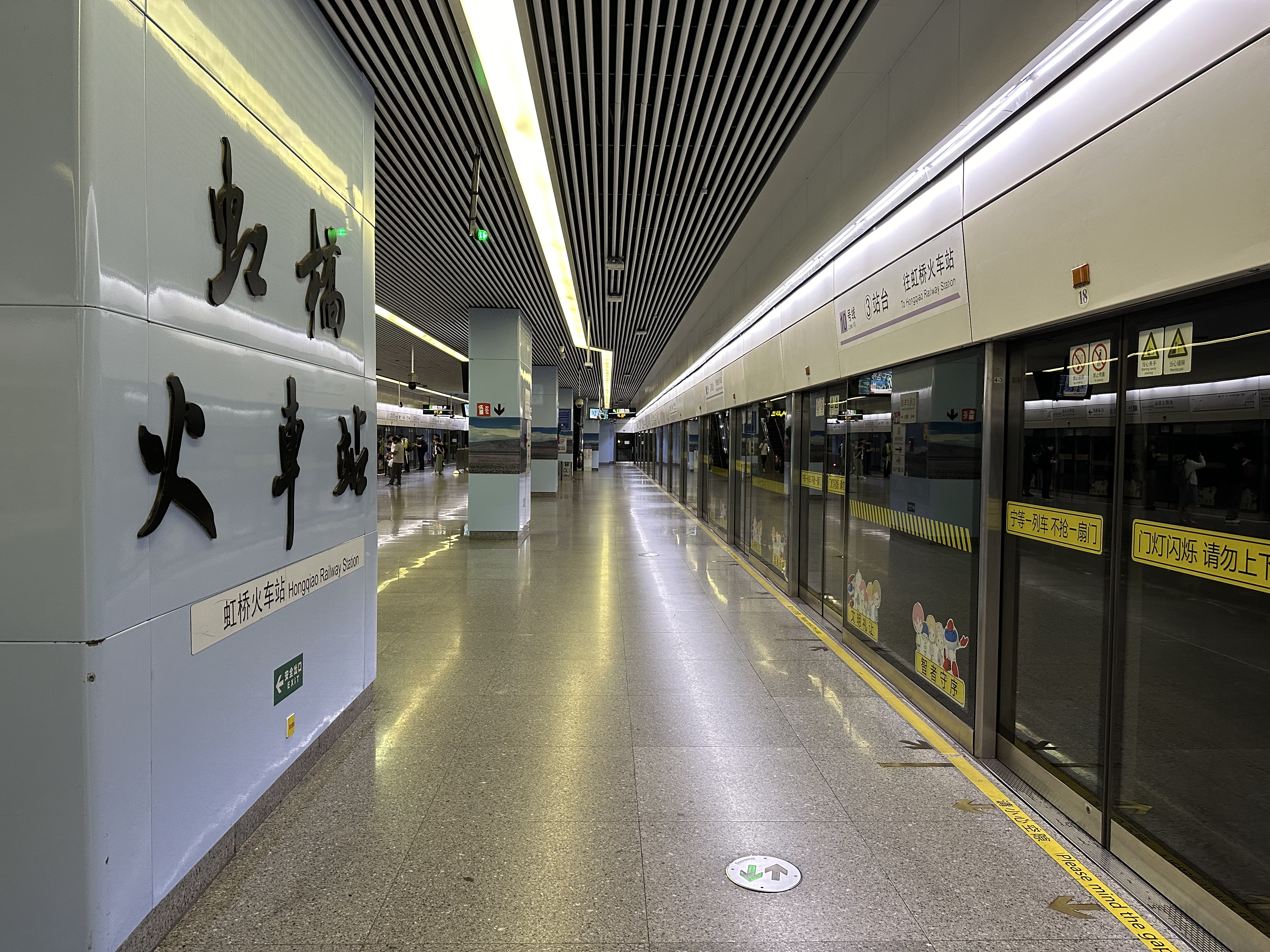
- Line 10 platform

General information
- Location: Shanghai Hongqiao railway station, Minhang District, Shanghai; China
- Coordinates: 31°11′38″N 121°19′08″E
- Operator: Shanghai No. 2 Metro Operation Co. Ltd.
- Lines: Line 2; Line 10; Line 17
- Platforms: 6 (3 island platforms)
- Tracks: 6
- Connections: Hongqiao Railway station (AOH)

Construction
- Structure type: Underground
- Accessible: Yes

Other information
- Station code: L02/29 (Line 2); L10/01 (Line 10)

History
- Opened: 1 July 2010 (Line 2); 30 November 2010 (Line 10); 30 December 2017 (Line 17)

Services
| Preceding station | Shanghai Metro | Following station |
|---|---|---|
| National Exhibition and Convention Center towards Panxiang Road · Shanghai National Accounting Institute | Line 2 | Hongqiao Airport Terminal 2 towards Pudong Airport Terminal 1&2 |
| Terminus | Line 10 | Hongqiao Airport Terminal 2 towards Jilong Road |
| National Exhibition and Convention Center towards Xicen | Line 17 | Terminus |
Location
- Location within Shanghai

Hongqiao Railway Station (simplified Chinese: 虹桥火车站; traditional Chinese: 虹橋火車站; pinyin: Hóngqiáo Huǒchēzhàn) is a Shanghai Metro station located within the Shanghai Hongqiao railway station complex in the city's Minhang District. As part of a major transportation hub, it serves as an interchange between Lines 2, 10, and 17. It additionally serves as the western terminus the mainline service of Line 10, as well as the eastern terminus of Line 17. The station first opened as a Line 2 station on 1 July 2010, with Line 10 operations commencing on 30 November 2010. More than seven years later, Line 17 service was introduced with the opening of that line on 30 December 2017. With three island platforms totaling six platforms, the station is one of the largest in the system and features a cross-platform interchange between Lines 2 and 17.

The station is unique in which it is the only station to feature left-hand running through an island platform, in which case this applies to Line 10. For this line, doors open on the right instead of on the left.

== History ==
The westward extension of Line 2 toward Hongqiao railway station was completed in March 2010, however the station itself did not open until four months later, on 1 July 2010. Line 10 services commenced on 30 November of the same year, providing another subway line into downtown Shanghai. Line 17, which serves the western suburb of Qingpu District, began operations at the station on 30 December 2017, concurrent with the opening of the line.

== Description ==
Hongqiao Railway Station, located under the railway station of the same name, is an interchange station connecting lines 2, 10, and 17. The concourse level of the metro station is connected directly to the arrivals hall of the railway station and below the departures hall. There are staffed ticket counters and automatic ticket machines, restroom facilities, eight exits and two entrances. The exits are labeled after six zones, named alphabetically from A to F. Zones A and B are closest to the train ticketing booths. Zones A through D are labeled for the departure halls, while Zones E and F are closest to the long-distance bus terminal.

The metro station itself consists of three island platforms serving six tracks, and all platforms are fully accessible from the concourse via elevator. The southernmost island platform serves Line 10 trains, with the south side (Platform 3) serving arriving trains only, while the north side (Platform 4) handles departing trains for Xinjiangwancheng. The middle island platform functions as an eastbound (downtown Shanghai-bound) cross-platform interchange between Line 17 and 2. On the north side (Platform 6), Line 17 trains disembark all passengers at its terminal station, while the south side (Platform 2) handles Line 2 eastbound trains. This provides an easy interchange for passengers continuing from Line 17 to Line 2 eastbound, allowing them to transfer without changing platforms. The northernmost island platform performs a similar function for westbound passengers changing from Line 2 to Line 17. Westbound Line 2 trains bound for East Xujing serve the north side (Platform 1), while departing westbound Line 17 trains serve the south side (Platform 5). Toilets are available on the east side of the middle island platform.

=== Station layout ===
| B1 | Concourse | Entrances and exits, Tickets, Service Center |
| B2 | Platform 1 | ← Line 2 towards Panxiang Road · Shanghai National Accounting Institute (National Exhibition and Convention Center) |
| B2 | Island platform, doors open on the left for Line 2, right for Line 17 |
| B2 | Platform 5 | ← Line 17 towards Xicen (National Exhibition and Convention Center) |
| B2 | Platform 6 | Line 17 termination platform → |
| B2 | Island platform, doors open on the left for Line 2, right for Line 17 |
| B2 | Platform 2 | Line 2 towards Pudong Airport Terminal 1&2 (Hongqiao Airport Terminal 2) → |
| B2 | Platform 4 | Line 10 towards Jilong Road (Hongqiao Airport Terminal 2) → |
| B2 | Island platform, doors open on the right |
| B2 | Platform 3 | ← Line 10 termination platform |

== Nearby landmarks ==
- Shanghai Hongqiao railway station, directly connected to the metro station
- Terminal 2 of Shanghai Hongqiao International Airport, also connected via an underground walkway, however Hongqiao Airport Terminal 2, the adjacent metro station eastbound on both Lines 2 and 10, serve the terminal directly

== Gallery ==
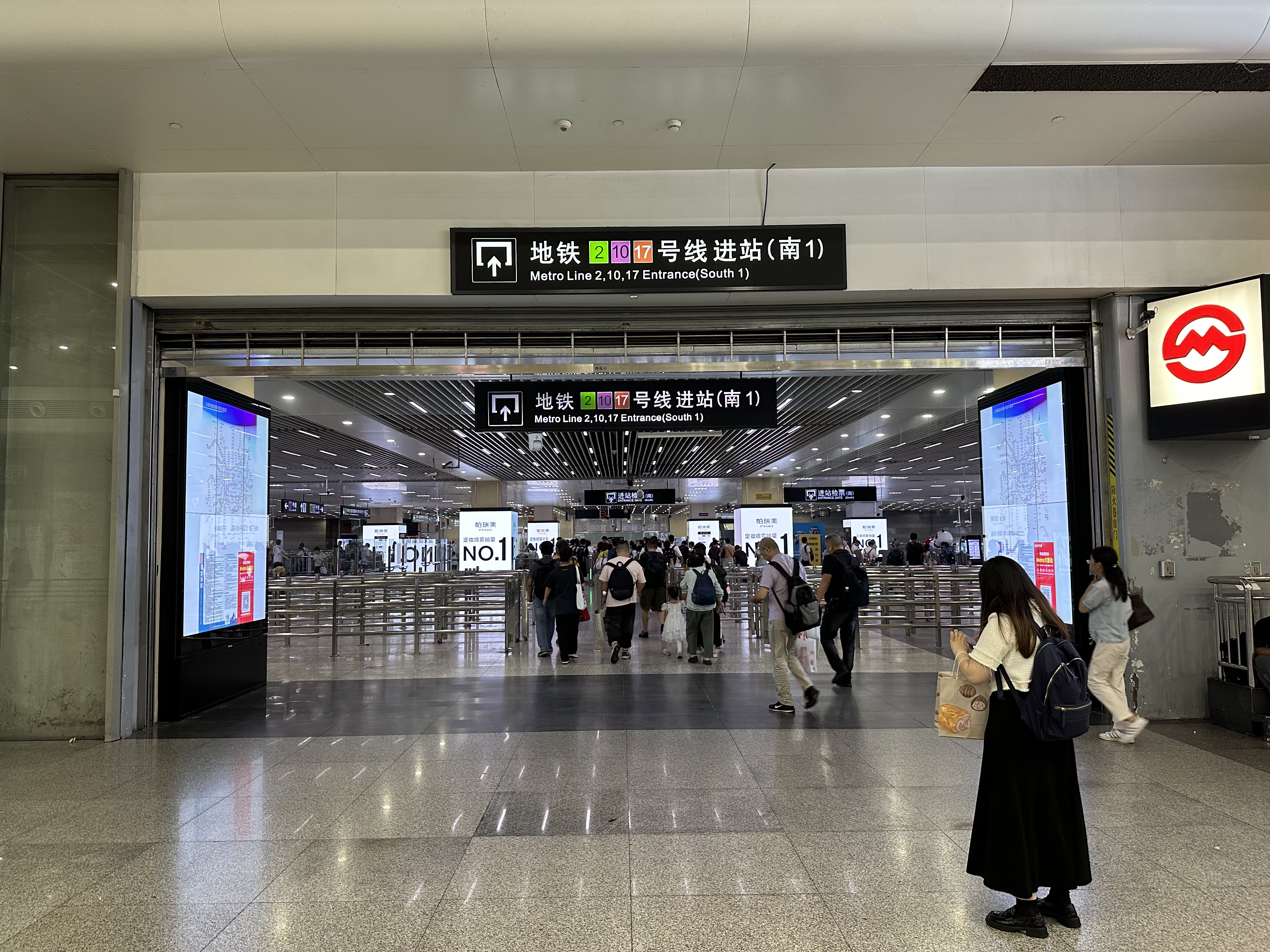
South 1 Entrance

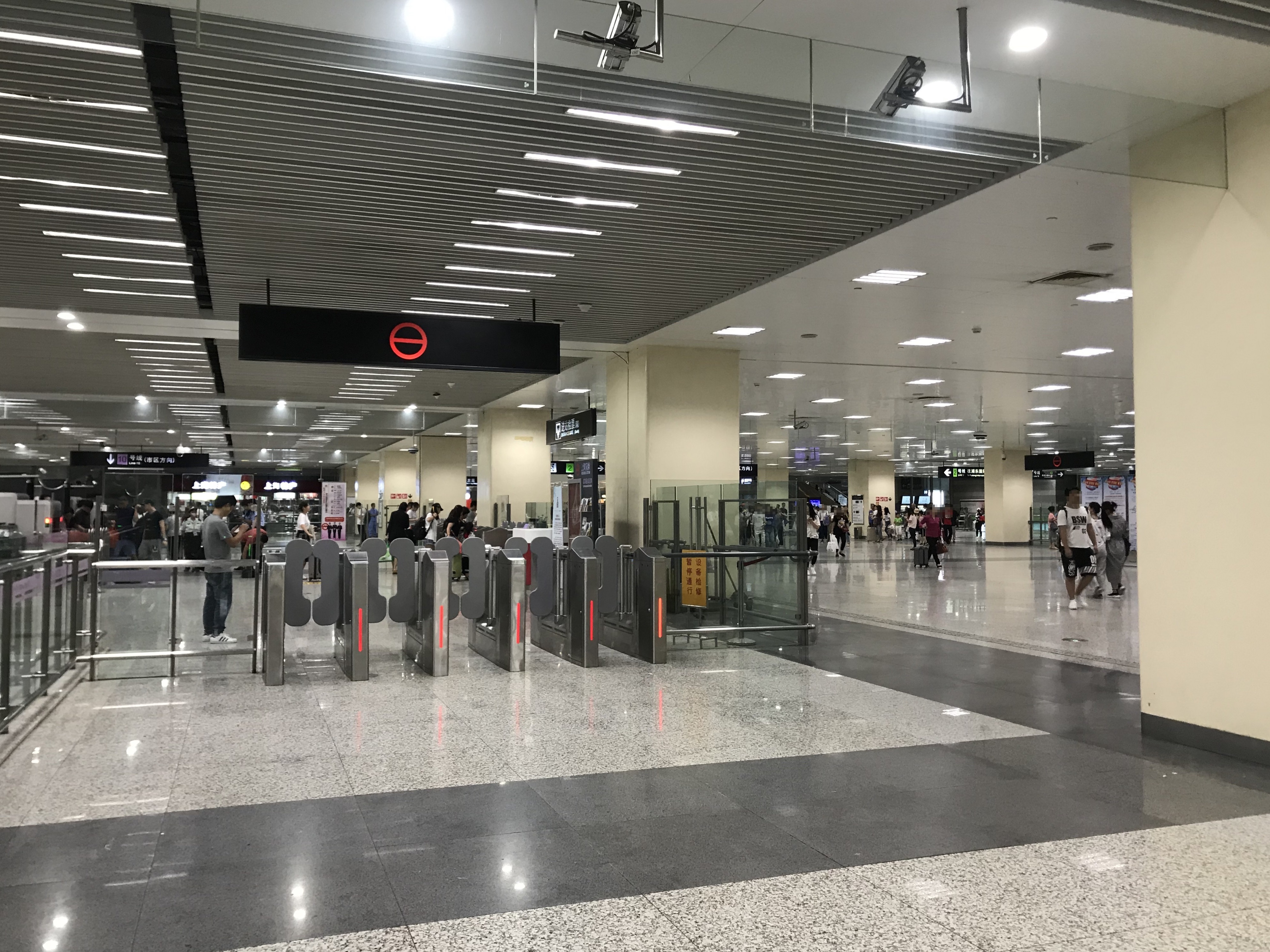
Concourse

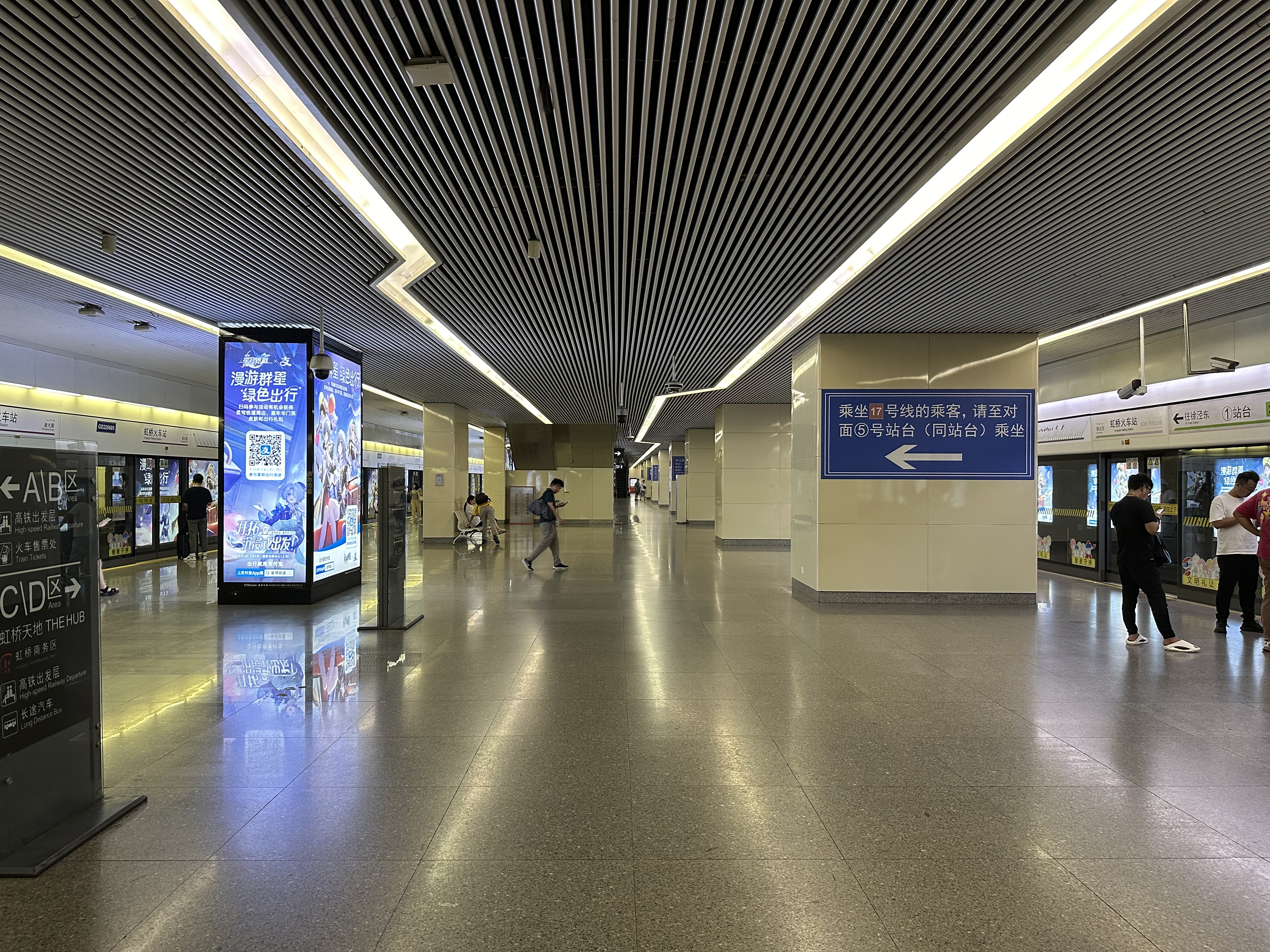
Cross-platform interchange between Lines 2 and 17

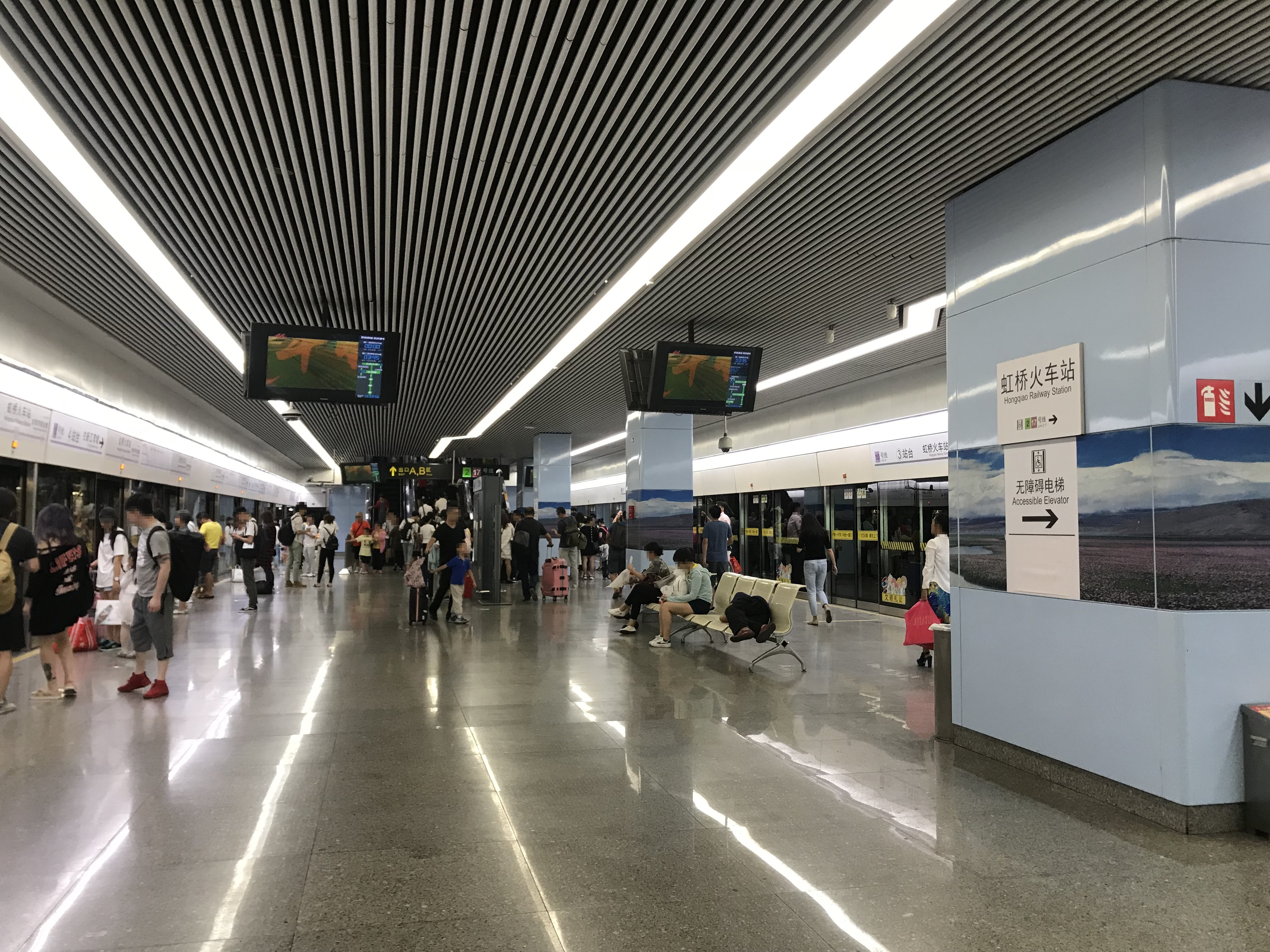
Line 10 platform
