= Jilong Road station =

Shanghai Metro station

Jilong Road 基隆路
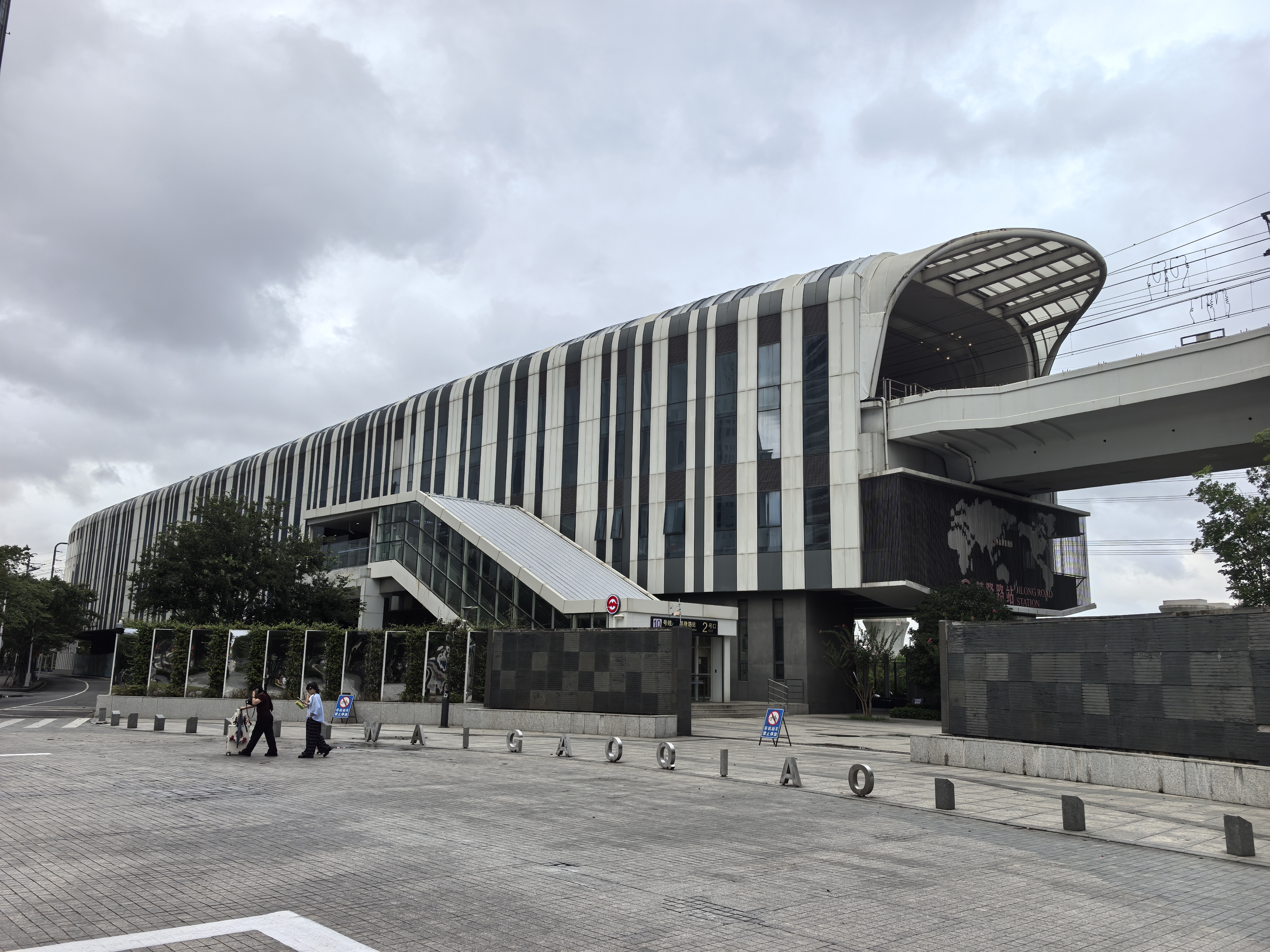
- Exterior

General information
- Location: North Fute Road and Jilong Road, Shanghai Free-Trade Zone (Waigaoqiao); Pudong New Area, Shanghai; China
- Coordinates: 31.353580°N 121.586101°E
- Operated by: Shanghai No. 1 Metro Operation Co. Ltd.
- Line: Line 10
- Platforms: 2 (2 side platforms)
- Tracks: 2

Construction
- Structure type: Elevated
- Accessible: Yes

Other information
- Station code: L10/34

History
- Opened: 26 December 2020

Services
Preceding station	Shanghai Metro	Following station
Gangcheng Road towards Hongqiao Railway Station or Hangzhong Road	Line 10	Terminus
Location

Jilong Road (Chinese: 基隆路; pinyin: Jīlóng Lù) is a Shanghai Metro station located on Line 10 in Pudong, Shanghai, China. Located at North Fute Road and Jilong Road, within the Shanghai Waigaoqiao Free Trade Zone section of the Shanghai Free-Trade Zone, it serves as a terminus of Line 10, and opened as part of the second phase extension of the line into Pudong. The extension was expected to open in 2018, but due to construction delays, the station, along with the rest of the extension, opened on 26 December 2020. The station is the first Shanghai Metro station to be located within a free-trade zone in the country.

== Exits ==
There are 2 exits in this station.

- Exit 1: North Fute Road, Gangjiu Road
- Exit 2: North Fute Road, Jilong Road
