= Trolleybuses in Shanghai =

Public transport system in Shanghai, China

Coordinates: 31°12′N 121°30′E

Shanghai trolleybus system
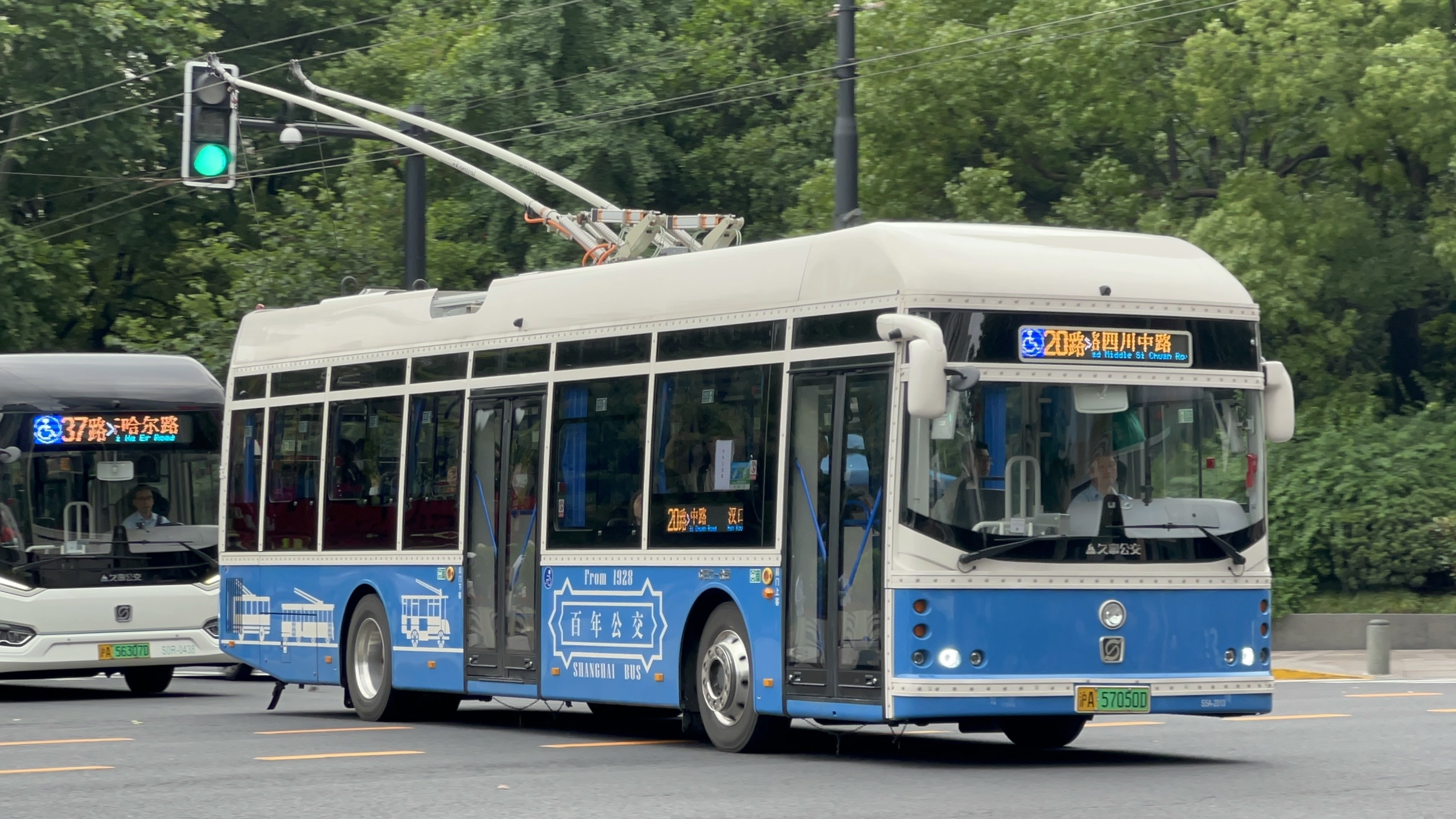
- A Sunwin SWB5129BEV77G trolleybus on route 20 in May 2023.

Operation
- Locale: Shanghai, China
- Open: 15 November 1914; 111 years ago
- Status: Open
- Operators: Shanghai Jiushi Public Transportation Group Company Limited: Shanghai Ba-Shi No.1 Public Transportation Co. Ltd (Former Shanghai Ba-Shi Trolleybus Co. Ltd, Chinese: 巴士电车, all lines except Route 71); Shanghai Ba-Shi No.3 Public Transportation Co. Ltd (Route 71)

Statistics
- Website: http://www.84000.com.cn Shanghai Jiushi Public Transportation Group Company Limited (Ba-Shi Group) (in Chinese)

The Shanghai trolleybus system is a system of trolleybuses forming part of the public transport network in the city of Shanghai, China. Of more than 300 trolleybus systems in operation worldwide (as of 2011), the Shanghai system is the oldest. The system turned 100 years old in November 2014 and was the first trolleybus system anywhere in the world to reach that milestone.

For many years, the Shanghai system was also one of the largest in the world, once comprising more than 20 routes and more than 900 vehicles in 1994, accounting for 30% of Shanghai's bus ridership. However the system started to decline in scale and service levels in the late 90s and throughout the 2000s with the fleet shrinking to 150 vehicles in 2012. Those smaller figures still make it one of the largest systems in operation outside the former Soviet Union countries. Since then, the trolleybus network is being expanded with a new expanded fleet of 300 trolleybuses for the 12 surviving lines and the introduction of new eBRT lines using trolleybuses in reserved lanes.

== History ==
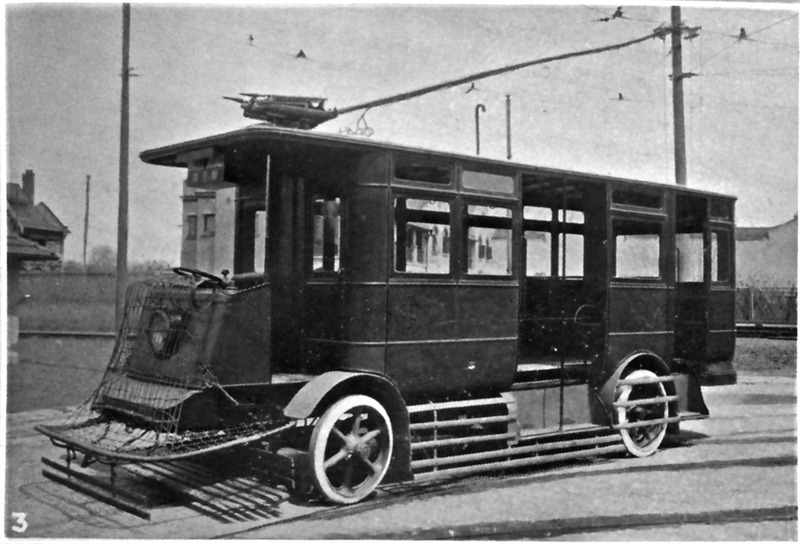
One of Shanghai's original Railless trolleybuses in 1917

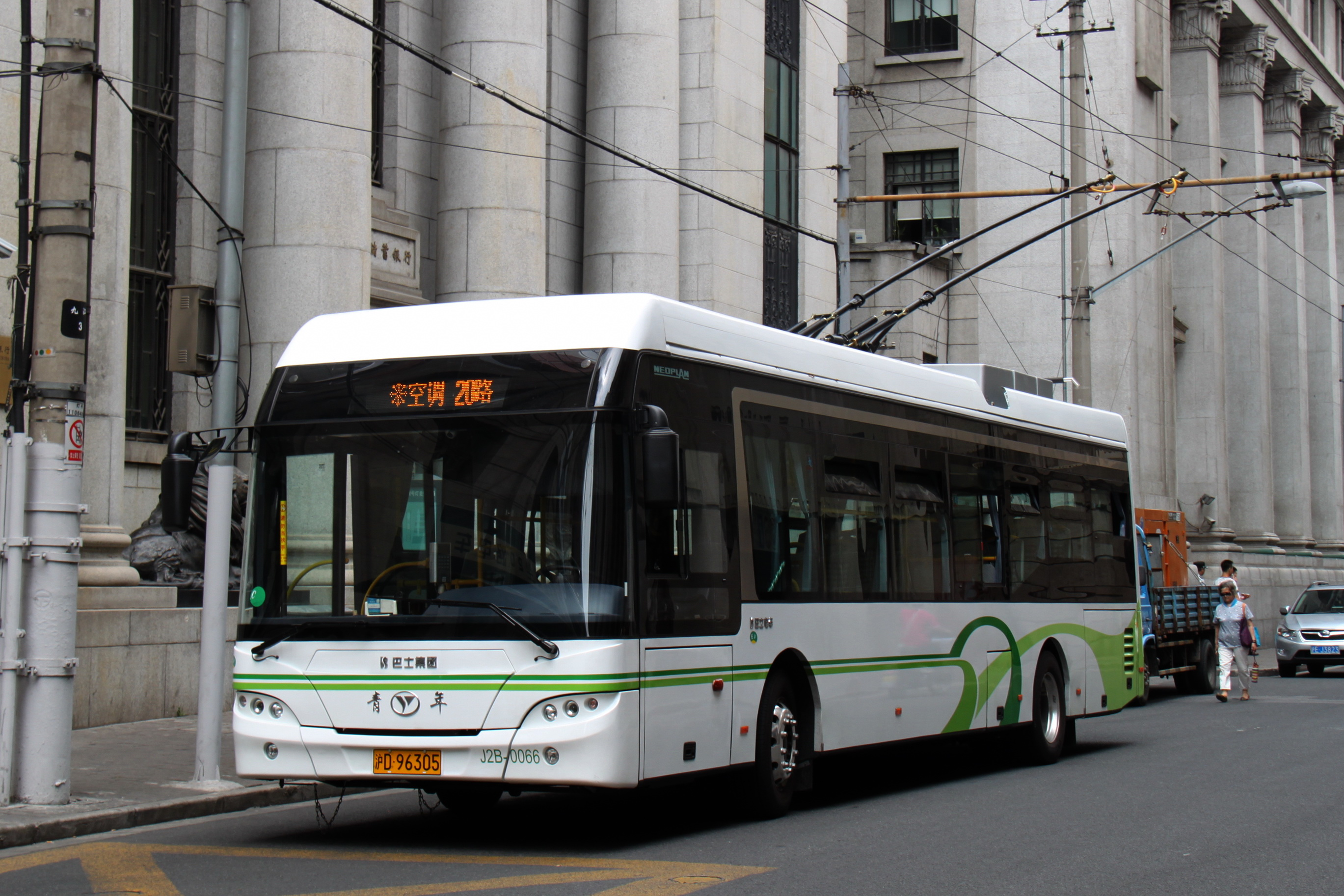
A Youngman trolleybus operating Route 20 in 2014

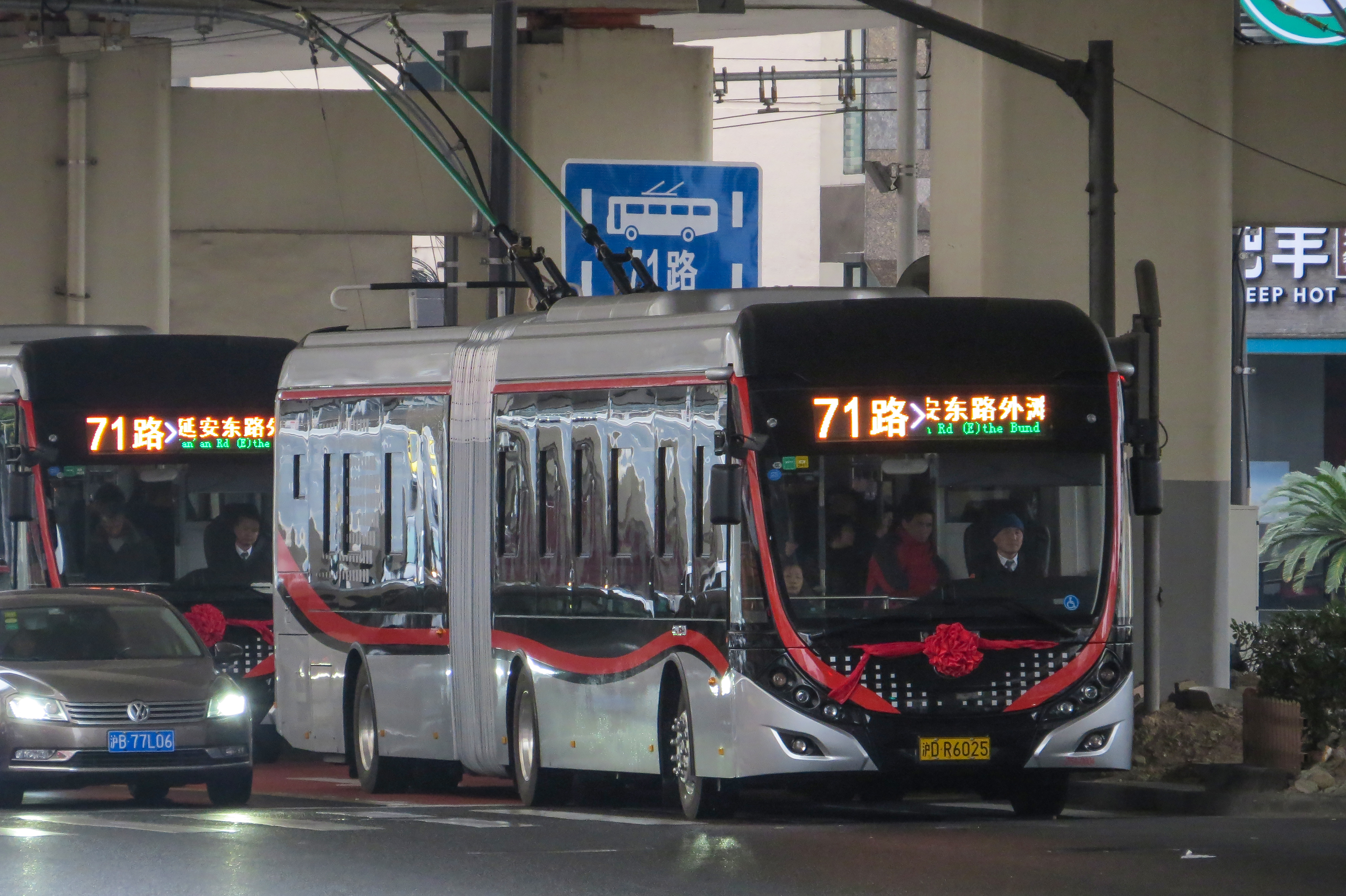
Yutong ZK5180A articulated trolleybuses operating on Route 71

The system's original operator was the Shanghai Electric Construction Company, which also operated trams in what was then the city's International sector. In its early years, the system had two routes, served by seven vehicles.

The first trolleybus service, route 14, which began operation on 15 November 1914, was along Fokien Road (now Fujian Road, or Fujian lu); service along Pekin Road (now Beijing Road, or Beijing lu) was introduced in 1915.

As of 1984, and still in 2003, the two original sections were still covered by portions of existing routes 14 and 16, respectively.

In its first 13 days of operation, the system carried 200,000 passengers, and came to be regarded as eminently suited to Shanghai's busy streets. However, the service then had to be temporarily abandoned while the roads on which they operated were strengthened, as the trolleybuses had been pressing down the surface stones with which the roads were paved.

A major expansion approved by the municipal council in 1924 would soon see the network expand from 3.5 km (2.2 mi) to 33.0 km (20.5 mi), and the company purchased 100 new trolleybuses for this expansion.

As of 1985, more than 40 percent of all passenger journeys on the Shanghai City Transport Company's system were made on trolleybuses, even though trolleybuses only made up about 20 percent of the company's fleet (the remainder were diesel buses). There were 19 trolleybus routes at that time, served by 860 articulated vehicles.

In 1994, the system was reported to comprise more than 20 routes, using a fleet of almost 900 vehicles, but in the subsequent years the route and fleet numbers have been in decline. In the late 90s a citywide road widening scheme demolished the overheads for Lines 9, 12, 16, 18 and 27. Later in the 2000s, Lines 21 and 17 were converted to regular buses in 2005 and 2007 respectively. Lines 11路 (11) and 26路 (26) were converted to super-capacitor buses in 2008 ahead of the Expo 2010. Super-capacitor buses are also electrically powered, but their electrical energy is supplied at charging stations at bus stops and termini (via so-called electric umbrellas), instead of by overhead wires. The energy is then stored between charging stations by onboard super capacitors.

The active fleet – the number of vehicles still in regular use – totaled a little more than 200 at the end of 2009. By 2013 the fleet shrunk to around 150 buses as older trolleybuses were retired and not replaced. However, after 2012, approaching the 100th anniversary of Shanghai trolleybus operations, rising awareness for the need of zero emissions transport and realization of trolleybuses as an icon of Shanghai; the Shanghai traffic department decided revitalize and support the development of trolleybuses. The trolleybus fleet was expanded to 300 with new dual-mode trolleybuses that can run 8 to 10 km (5.0 to 6.2 mi) "off-wire" on battery power in 2014. Line 13 was extended and replaced route 922, a regular bus route, using a new fleet of Youngman-Neoplan JNP6120BEV1 dual-mode trolleybuses that run on batteries in sections without overhead wire.

In February 2017, a number of ordinary bus lines running under the Yan'an Elevated Road was altered and transformed into Yan'an Road Medium Capacity Bus Transit System, or route 71路, a trolleybus bus rapid transit line running in the reserved lanes in the center of Yan'an Road. The line is served by a fleet of 40 Yutong ZK5180A articulated bus and 28 Yutong ZK5120C rigid dual-mode trolleybuses. Buses achieved an average operating speed of 17.6 km/h (10.9 mph) on the line. The line has an average weekday ridership of about 54,000 people, making itself the most used bus line in Shanghai. Line 71 doesn't share any overhead wires with other trolleybus routes.

On 28 July 2021, the Shanghai road transport department raised the issue of 'optimising' the traditional trolleybus network, which will result in the removal of all infrastructure on routes 6, 8, 13, 22, 25 and 28 to balance between historical value and space taken by wires. Trolleybuses on these routes will be replaced by electric buses. The withdrawal of trolleybuses on these routes began on 15 August 2022, starting with route 25.

== Lines ==
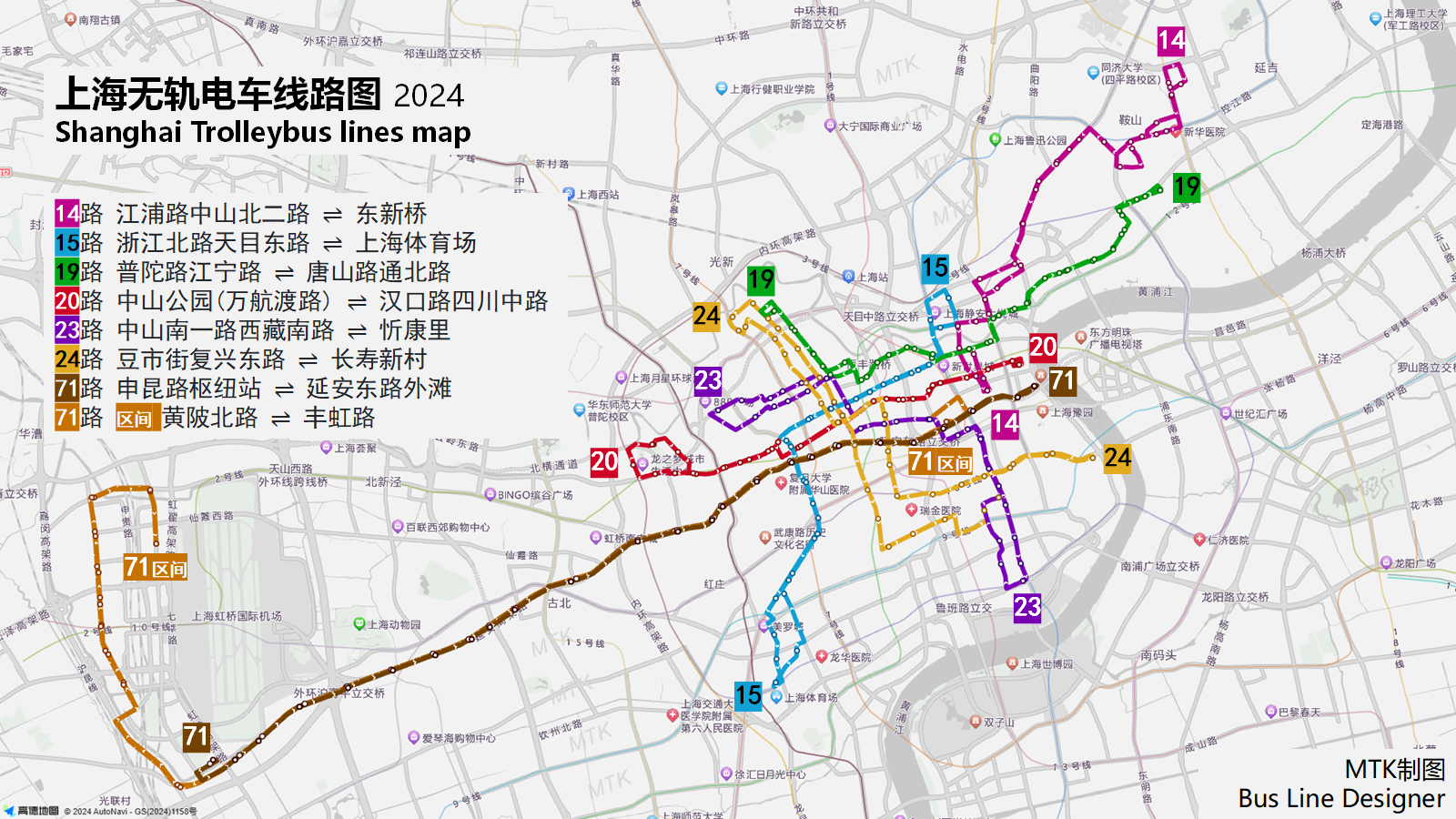
Trolleybus lines in Shanghai

As of January 2023, the system was made up of the following lines:

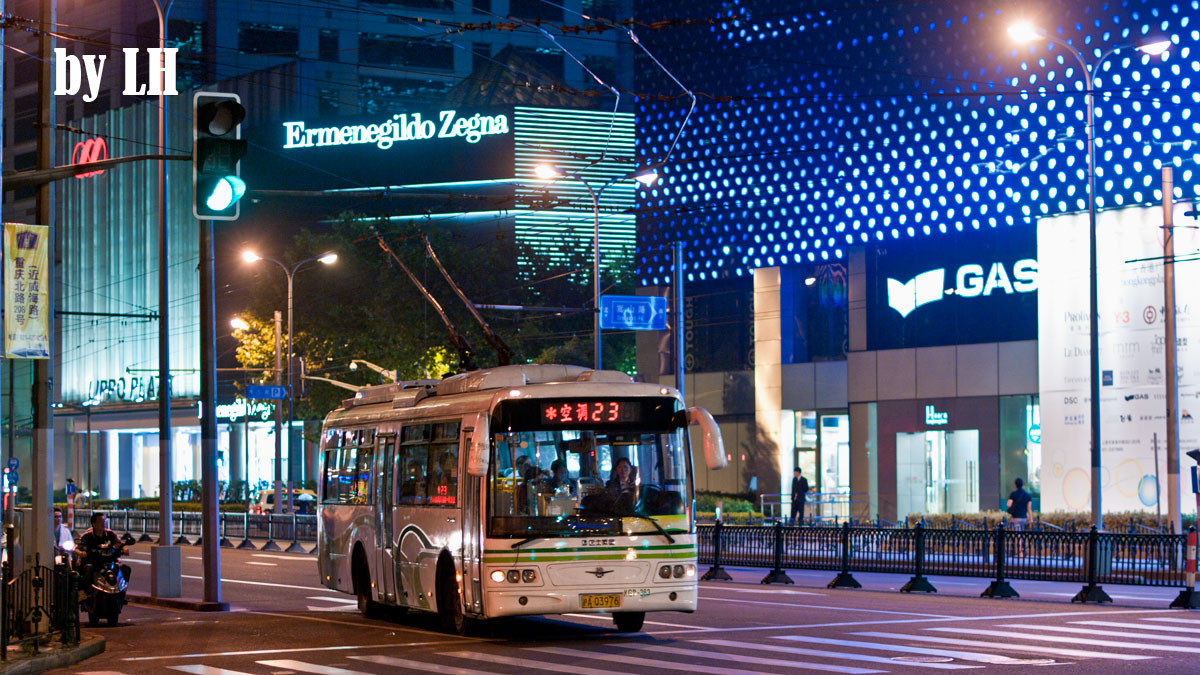
A trolleybus operating route 23.

Line	Route	Length
14路 (Line 14)	Jiangpu Road / North No.2 Zhongshan Road – Dongxinqiao	9.5 km
15路 (Line 15)	North Zhejiang Road / East Tianmu Road – Shanghai Stadium	10.6 km
19路 (Line 19)	Putuo Road / Jiangning Road – Tangshan Road / Tongbei Road	10.5 km
20路 (Line 20)	Jiujiang Road / The Bund – Zhongshan Park (Wanhangdu Road)	7.7 km
23路 (Line 23)	South No.1 Zhongshan Road / Xizang Road – Xinkang Li	9.9 km
24路 (Line 24)	Doushi Street / East Fuxing Road – Changshou Village	10.2 km
71路 (Line 71)	East Yan'an Road / The Bund – Shenkun Road Bus Terminal; Partial Line: North Huangpi Road - Shenkun Road Bus Terminal	17.5 km Partial Line: 15.5 km

== Fleet ==
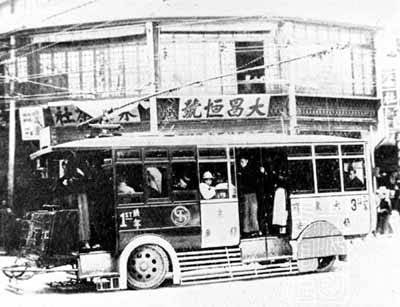
A Railless vehicle in the 1920s.

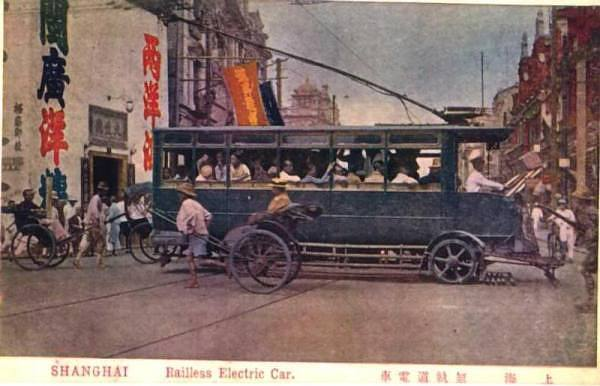
One of the AEC trolleybuses in service.

The initial, two-route, system that opened in 1914–15 used a fleet of seven trolleybuses. These used chassis built by Railless Electric Traction, in England, and fitted with motors and controllers supplied by Dick, Kerr & Company. Shipped to China in 1914, they were then fitted with bodies fabricated locally by the Shanghai Electric Construction Company, the system's operator at the time. These trolleybuses had three separate compartments, for first-, second- and third-class passengers. The driver was semi-exposed in an open platform at the front.

In 1921, one complete trolleybus was shipped from England. This had the same chassis and propulsion but received a body made by Short Brothers. In 1922, the company purchased another seven Railless chassis with propulsion by English Electric (which had taken over Dick, Kerr & Company in 1919), and fitted them with locally built bodies, to an improved design for which the solitary all-British-built vehicle may have served, in effect, as a pattern. All of these early trolleybuses had solid tyres.

In 1924, following the adoption of a major expansion plan, the Shanghai system placed an order for 100 new trolleybuses, which stood for the next 10 years as the single largest order ever placed for trolleybuses. These vehicles had chassis by Associated Equipment Company (AEC) and propulsion equipment from other British companies, and were fitted with Shanghai-built bodies. Approximately 30 more of the same type were purchased later.

Since the 1950s, almost all trolleybuses entering service on the Shanghai system have been built in Shanghai itself, mostly by a vehicle manufacturing division – commonly referred to in English transport publications simply as "Shanghai" – of the transport operating company, Shanghai City Transport Company.

Production of trolleybuses at the Shanghai factory began in 1951, and the factory has also supplied vehicles to the trolleybus systems in several other Chinese cities. As of 1983, the factory was capable of producing 300 trolleybuses per year.

The first articulated trolleybuses entered service in 1962 or 1963. These were Shanghai-built model SK663, which gradually replaced many two-axle vehicles and went on to become, at one point, the most numerous model of trolleybus in Shanghai's then-large fleet. The SK663 remained in production until 1969, replaced in 1970 by the SK561G, and later by a succession of newer models of articulated trolleybus.

In the early 1980s, more than 800 of the fleet of about 850–900 trolleybuses were articulated, giving Shanghai the distinction of having more articulated trolleybuses than any other city in the world. About 150 of these were the surviving SK663 articulated trolleybuses manufactured in the 1960s. The last two-axle vehicles were withdrawn in 1983, after which the fleet was 100 percent articulated vehicles, with a total of around 860.

Several years later, the operator began purchasing new two-axle trolleybuses, and these gradually replaced all of the articulated vehicles. By at least 2009, when the operating fleet numbered about 280, all vehicles were two-axle.

Since 2001, all new trolleybuses placed into service on the Shanghai system have air conditioning. The last non-air-conditioned units were withdrawn in late 2009. At that time, the fleet size stood at a little over 200 vehicles.

In 2014, Youngman trolleybuses entered service across the entire network.

In January 2022, a voting was held online for netizens to choose the design of newer Sunwin trolleybuses. The contest ended with a retro design being chosen, and the new trolleybuses entered service in September that year.

== See also ==
- List of trolleybus systems
- Public transport in Shanghai
- Buses in Shanghai
- Shanghai Jiushi Group
- Shanghai Metro
