= Buses in Shanghai =

Coordinates: 31°12′N 121°30′E

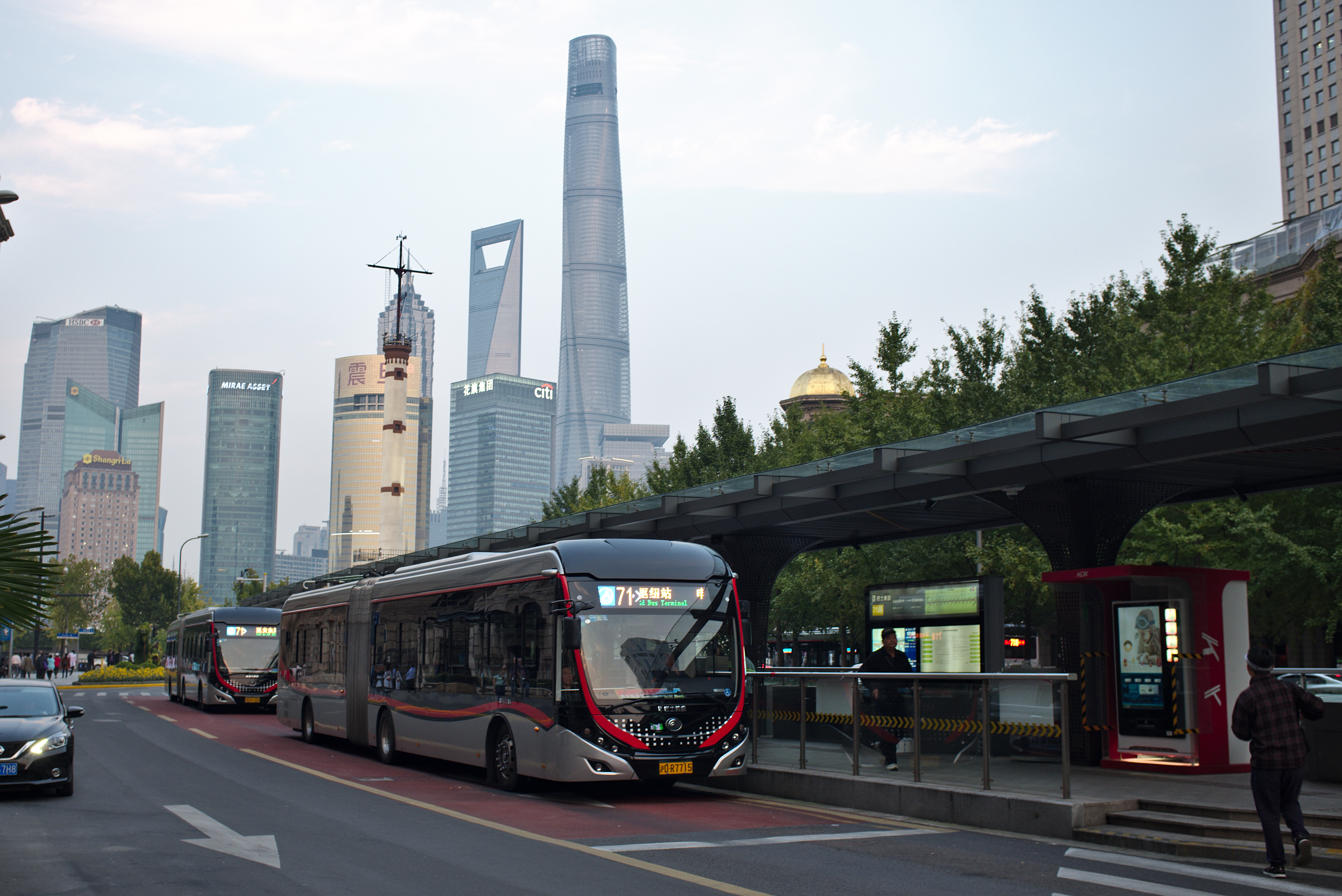
Shanghai Bus Route 71 in the Bund

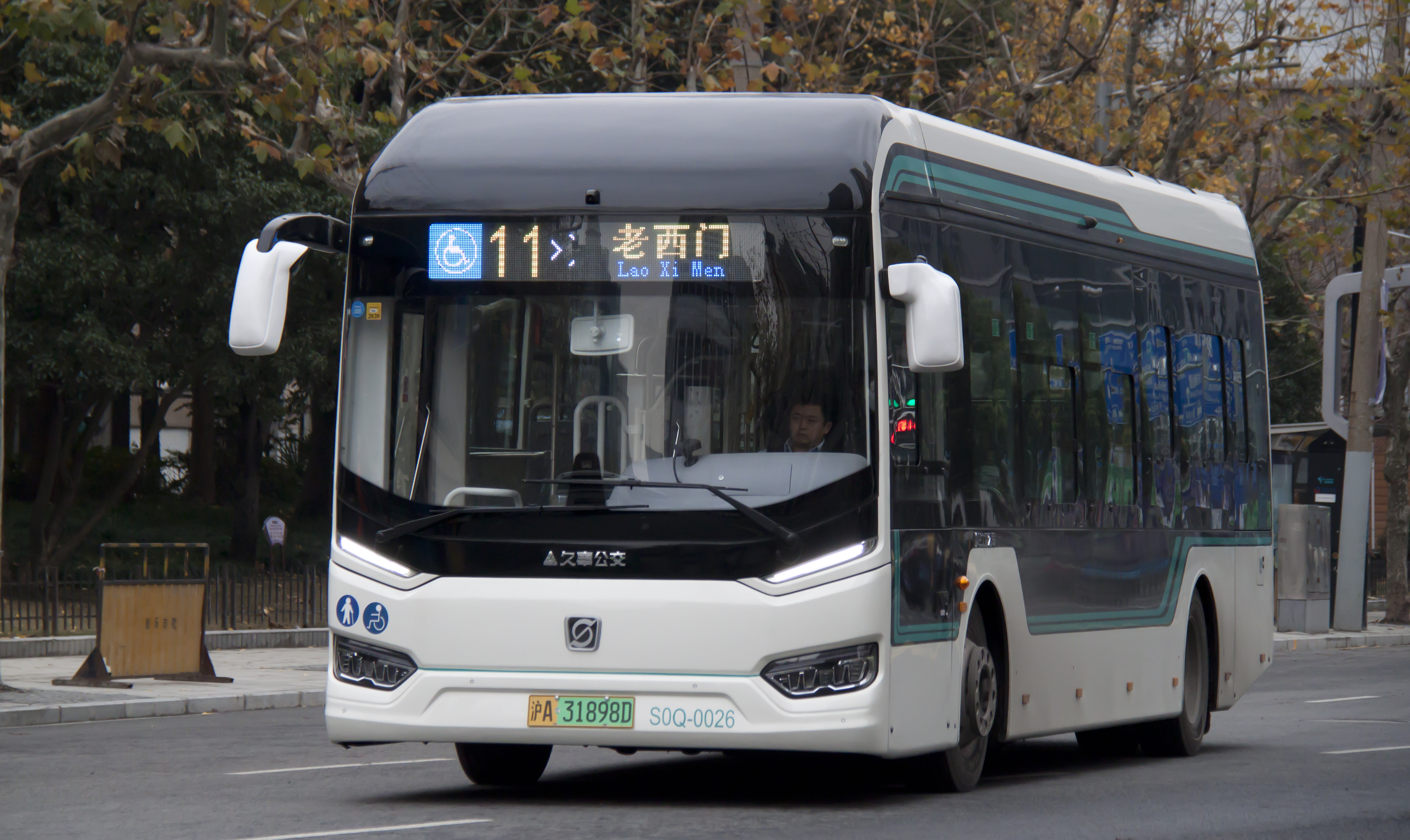
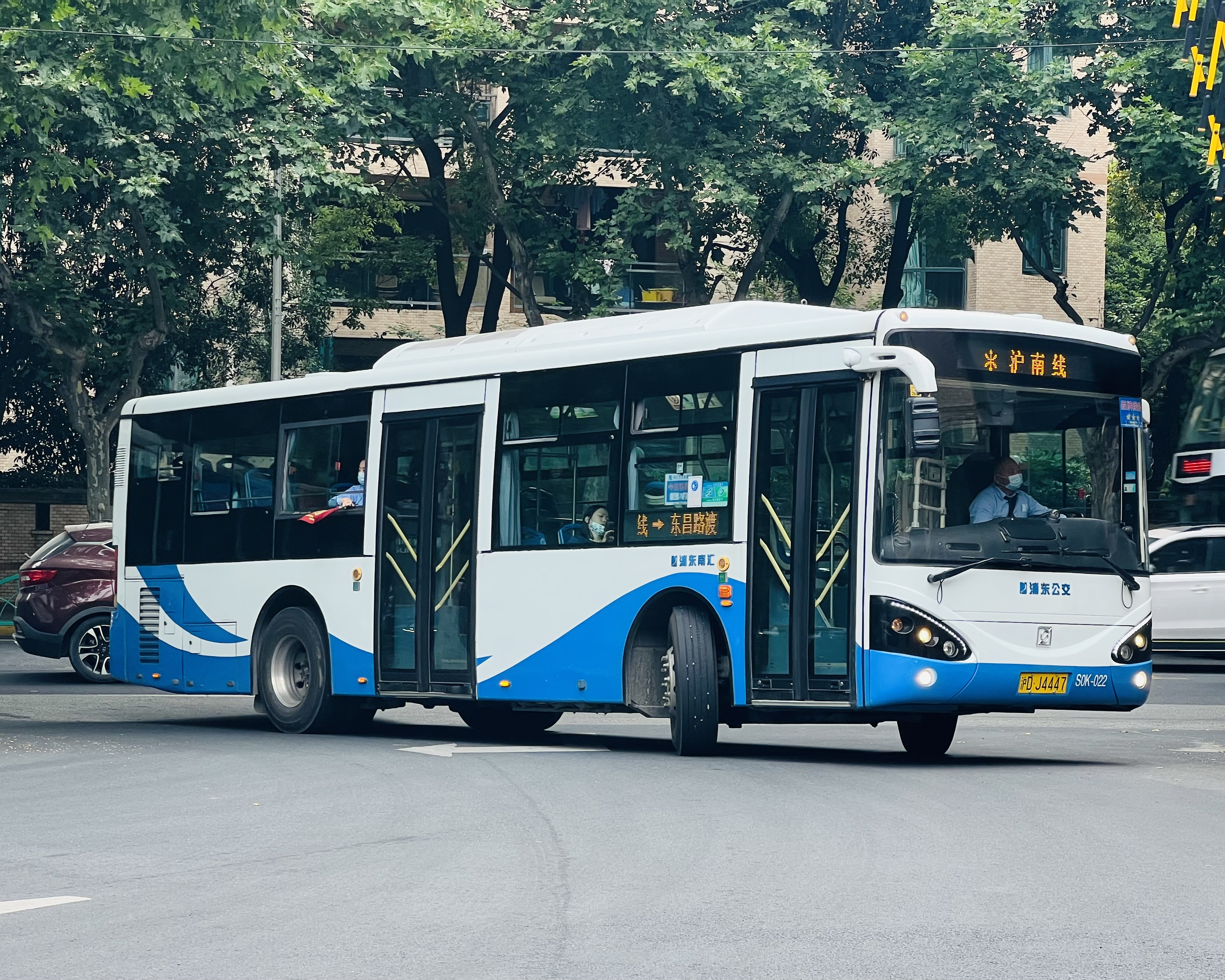
Jiushi Group (top) and Pudong Bus (bottom), which operate mainly in Puxi and Pudong respectively, are the two largest bus operators in Shanghai.

Shanghai has around 2000 formal bus lines (including city center, trolleybuses and suburban lines), served by more than 10 bus companies. In the past, Bashi, Dazhong, Guanzhong and Qiangsheng were the four largest; around 2009 they merged to become Bashi Group Companies, including Bashi No.1-6 Bus Passenger Service Companies, Bashi Tram, Bashi Xinxin and Chongming Company, Baoshan Company and Jinshan Company. Each Suburban district also renewed with one company serving each district. Around 2015, Bashi No.1 Passenger Service and Bashi Tram merged to be Bashi No.1 Company, Bashi No.2 Passenger Service became Bashi No.2 Company, Bashi No.3, No.4 Passenger Service merged to be Bashi No.3 Company, Bashi No.6 Passenger Service became Bashi No.4 Company, and Bashi No.5 Passenger Service and Baoshan Company became Bashi No.5 Company.

Liveries of different bus companies differ. The most ordinary livery is often called "SH Livery", which was established in 2001. Bashi Group buses, Jinshan Bus Co. of Jinshan District, Minhang Bus Co. of Minhang District and other private bus companies use such kind of livery, while different in colors. Pudong Bus of Pudong New Area has its special livery established in 2009, which is blue and is often called "Haibao Livery". Songjiang Bus of Songjiang District has a livery of a combination of red and grey, which was established in 2007. Fengxian Bus of Fengxian District has a livery of green and white and another livery based on "SH Livery" but with the color of green and blue, which were established after Fengxian Bashi and Fengxian Bus (local owned).Qingpu Bus of Qingpu District started using new livery since the end of 2015, which contains the same color with Bashi "SH Livery" but has different patterns. Zongshen Dazhong of Qingpu District has a special livery of a combination of yellow and green on some of its bus routes.

Since 2006, Shanghai has been the leading Chinese system to implement electric and hybrid buses. During the 2010 Shanghai World Expo, the city piloted a program that includes 256 new energy buses with low to no emission. As of May 2015, the system has over 1,700 new energy buses, amounting to over 20% of the entire fleet.

During the mid-2000s, the city converted many traditional trolley routes to a standard diesel fleet because of route flexibility, speed, and eliminating the visual pollution of overhead wires. However, the obvious benefits of the trolley buses have brought back a renewed interest in keeping and developing the program. In 2013, Bashi Trolley Bus Company ordered 300 new trolleybuses to replace the aging fleet and grow the overall number of trolleys in Shanghai.

In February 2017, a number of ordinary bus lines running under the Yan'an Elevated Road was altered and transformed into the Yan'an Road Medium Capacity Bus Transit System, a trolleybus bus rapid transit line running in the reserved lanes in the center of Yan'an Road. The line is served by a fleet of 40 Yutong ZK5180A articulated bus and 28 Yutong ZK5120C rigid dual-mode trolleybuses. Buses achieved an average operating speed of 17.6 km/h (10.9 mph) on the line. The line has an average weekday ridership of about 54,000 people, making itself the most used bus line in Shanghai. Line 71 doesn't share any overhead wires with other trolleybus routes.

On 28 July 2021, the Shanghai road transport department raised the issue of 'optimising' the traditional trolleybus network, which will result in the removal of all infrastructure on routes 6, 8, 13, 22, 25 and 28 to balance between historical value and space taken by wires. Trolleybuses on these routes will be replaced by electric buses.

== Naming scheme ==
Most downtown buses use numbers to specify the lines, while suburban buses and a few downtown bus lines use Chinese characters. In the recent decade, there has been increased activity in network optimization and as a result, many bus lines have been cut, shorted, and combined. Many named bus lines have been converted to number lines with a flat fare. Some regular lines have been changed to rush-hour only, while still keeping their original line numbers.

=== Numerical lines ===
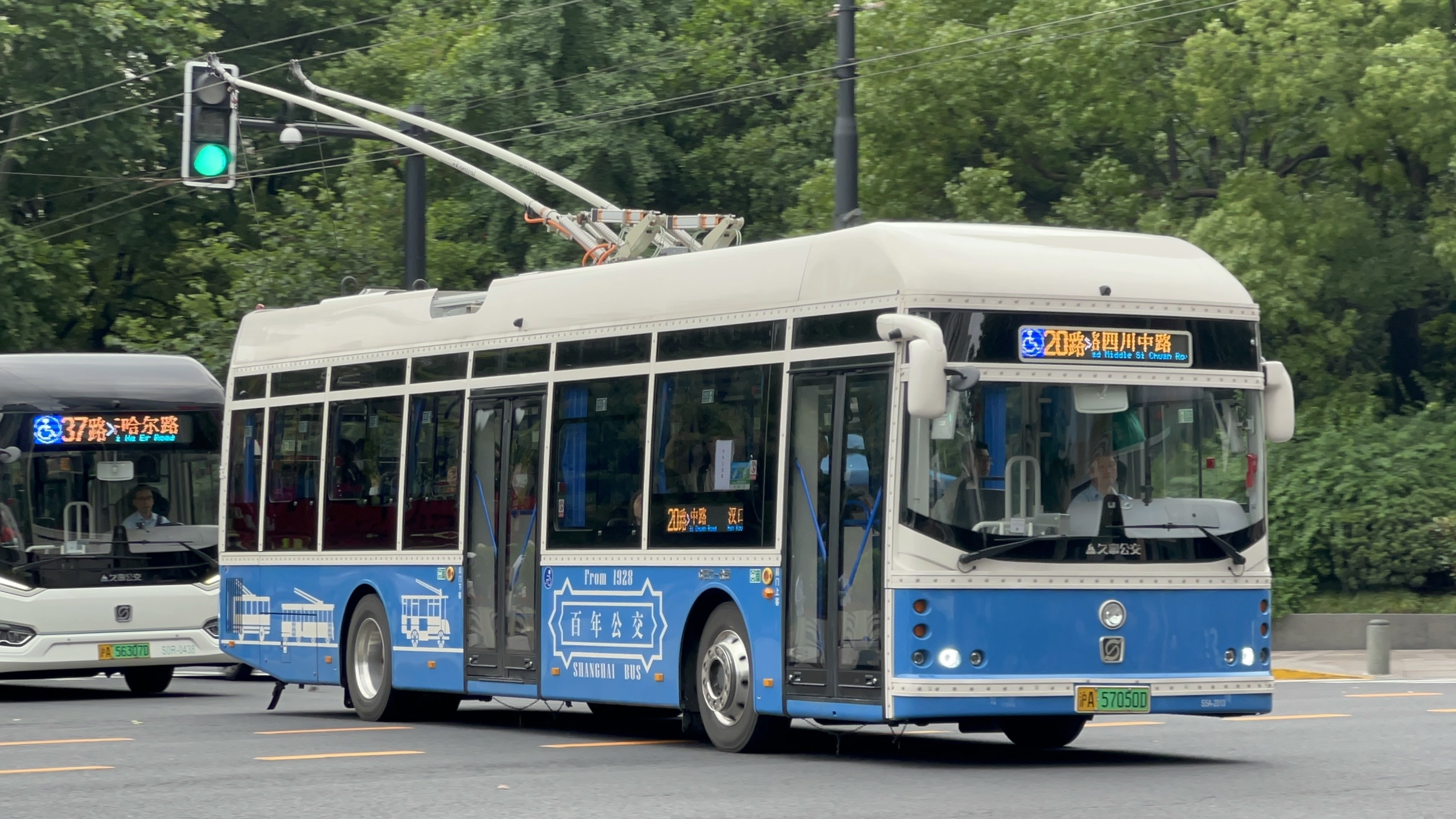
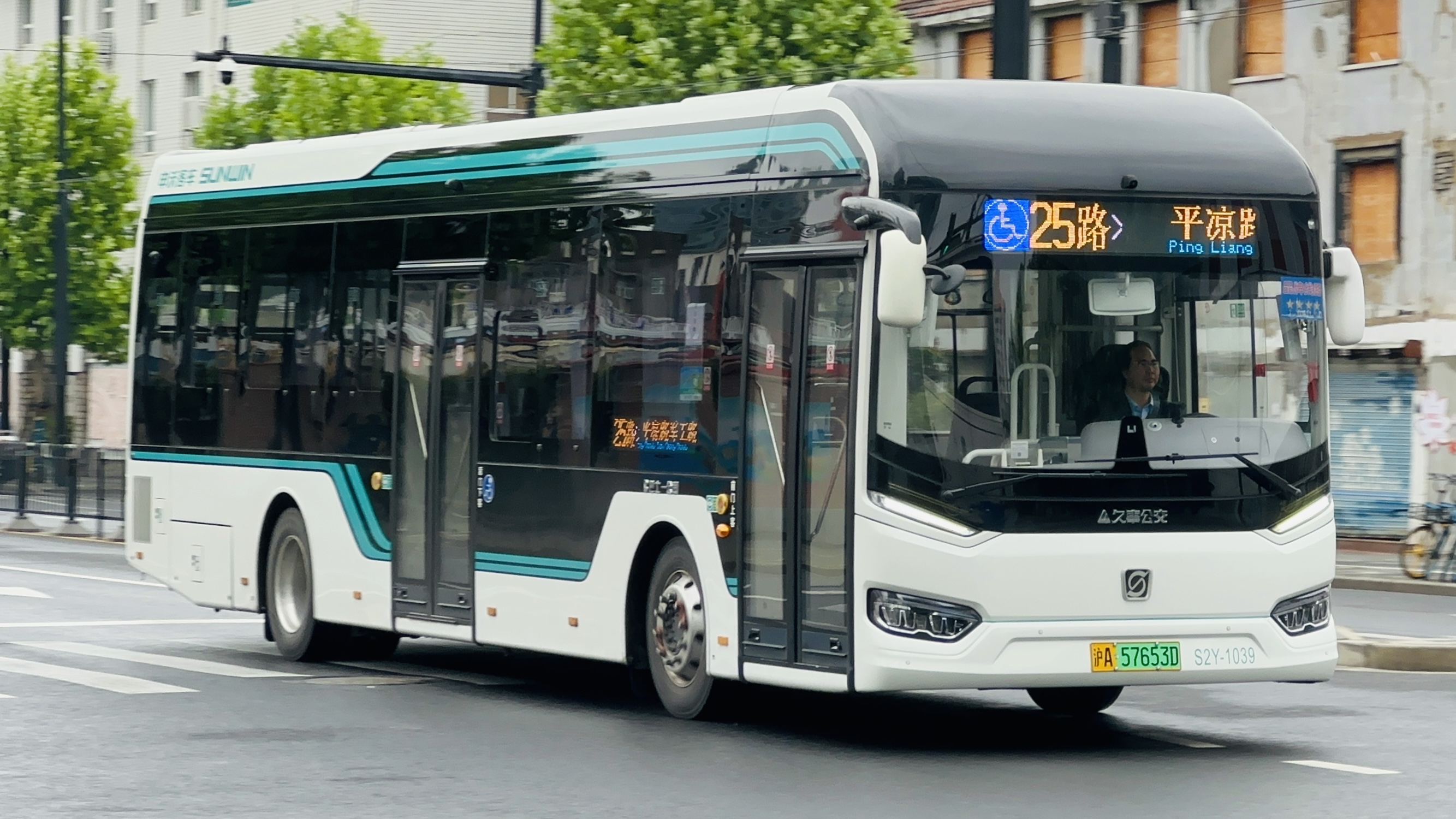
Route 20 (left) is an example of a trolleybus route, while route 25 (right) was also a trolleybus route, but has been converted to run on conventional buses.
- Line numbers under 200 are conventional buses (Chinese: 常规公交线路). In these buses, majority of the lines under 30 (except those starting with 0), as well as 71 use or previously used trolleybuses, although some have been converted to use conventional buses. All trolleybuses are air-conditioned.
- Line numbers between 200 and 299 are mostly lines dedicated for rush-hour only, with some exceptions where some lines are converted from peak-hour only to full day service.
- Line numbers between 300 and 399 are night buses (Chinese: 夜宵公交线路).
- Line numbers between 400 and 499 are buses that cross the Huangpu River. There are also many other bus lines that cross the Huangpu River.
- Line numbers between 500 and 599 are special-line connecting buses (Chinese: 专线公交线路).Some of them are merged into one line(e.g. Bus line 562 & 62 merged into 62), and some lines are renamed using the numbers between 900 and 999 after its buses were replaced by air-conditioned buses during 1990s(e.g. Former Bus line 591 renamed into 936).
- Line numbers between 600 and 699 are special-line buses in Pudong.
- Line numbers between 700 and 799 are suburban conventional lines (Chinese: 通郊公交线路). Most 700s buses have at least one terminal beyond Outer Ring Road (S20 Road).
- Line numbers between 800 and 899 are special-line buses (Chinese: 专线公交线路). Most of them are mid-size buses, but now they are being replaced with air-conditioned large buses. These lines were previously run by private companies, but have since been overtaken by some big bus groups, The quality and reliability of these lines have been improved significantly.
- Line numbers between 900 and 999 were air-conditioned special-line buses (Chinese: 空调专线公交线路), though as of 2020 the special designation has dropped since all bus routes in Shanghai have been air-conditioned.
- Line numbers over 1000 are community conventional buses (Chinese: 社区短驳公交线路). These usually use medium-size buses to connect neighborhoods to bus or subway stations and have circular routes.
- Line numbers prefixed with "DZ" (from 定制 dìngzhì, "customized") are used for routes crowd-sourced by riders on an online platform and approved by the city, an initiative which started in 2025.

=== Non-numerical lines ===
- Tunnel Lines (Chinese: 隧道公共汽车线路)

Tunnel Lines 1 to 9, except Tunnel Line 5, run across a tunnel under Huangpu River. While being the same as buses in the 400s, there are many other buses that cross the many tunnels under the Huangpu River while not named as a tunnel line.

- Bridge Lines (Chinese: 大桥公共汽车线路)

Bridge Lines 1 to 6 run across bridges over the Huangpu River, including Lupu Bridge, Nanpu Bridge, and Yangpu Bridge. While being the same as buses in the 400s, there are many other buses that cross the many bridges over the Huangpu River while not named as a bridge line.

- Airport Lines (Chinese: 机场公共汽车线路)

Airport Lines 1 to 7 connect Pudong International Airport to downtown Shanghai and Hongqiao International Airport, while Airport Special Line (Chinese: 机场专线) connects Hongqiao International Airport to the Jing'an Temple in downtown Shanghai.

- Sub-urban and Rural Lines (Chinese: 郊区公共汽车线路)

There will be various additional naming schemes in the alphabet lines. Most lines are named as "XY Line", where X and Y indicate the two terminals of this line, e.g., "莘纪线" (Xin Ji Line) is a bus which runs between Xinzhuang and Jiwang.

Some other lines only indicate one terminal, e.g., "宝杨码头专线" (Baoyang Port Special Line) is a bus which runs between Baoyang Port and Shanghai Railway Station.

In the central portion of some suburbs, there are lines with the name format of "XX No. X" line.

- Some of them are community conventional buses (Chinese: 社区短驳公交线路 whose names are started with the name of a town, sub-district, or, directly, district, e.g. Jiangchuan Route 1 (Chinese: 江川1路) in Minhang and Jiading Route 103 (former Anting Route 1) Chinese: 嘉定103路（安亭1路）.
- Some of them are special-line buses (Chinese: 专线公交线路) for special events, e.g. Expo Route 18 (Chinese: 世博18路),
- Some of them are special-line buses (Chinese: 专线公交线路) for Terminal Stations, e.g. Hongqiao Hub Route 5 (Chinese: 虹桥枢纽5路), Temporary Special Route 1 and Route 4 for Chunyun (Chinese: 春运临时专线1路、4路, now named Route 01 and 04) for West Shanghai Railway Station.

== Fare ==
All flat-rate fare and numbered lines and most distance-based fare lines accept the Shanghai public transport card and the Shanghai public transport QR code. The transfer discount policy for Shanghai public transport service is applicable.

- Shanghai, in principle, follows the convention that prevails in most Chinese cities whereby 'standard' buses charge between 1 and 2 yuan. Some short-distance community bus lines are priced at only 1 yuan.
- Long-distance buses may charge according to distance traveled, usually between 1 yuan for the shortest trips and 11 yuan at maximum. Some long-distance buses may charge a flat rate fare according to the route length. For example, the bus from Jiading's Nanmen to Yangpu's Wujiaochang charges 8 yuan.

According to the local charging policy, passengers using Shanghai public transportation cards or Shanghai public transportation QR codes can enjoy one yuan off for transfers between metro and buses within 120 minutes.

Since Sept 27, 2023, Shanghai's MaaS system introduced a digital one-day pass, which can be purchased through the dedicated WeChat miniprogram at 19.8 yuan, and passengers may take most bus lines (excluding expressway buses) without limit in 24 hours.

== See also ==
- Trolleybuses in Shanghai
- List of trolleybus systems
- Shanghai Jiushi Group
- Shanghai Metro
