= Shanghai Trolleybus Route 20 =

Trolleybus route in Shanghai, China

- A Sunwin iEV12T on Jiujiang Road in June 2025

Overview
- Operator: Shanghai Ba-Shi No.1 Public Transportation Co. Ltd (巴士一公司)
- Vehicle: Sunwin SWB5129BEV77G
- Began service: 27 September 1928

Route
- Route type: Trolleybus route
- Start: Zhongshan Park (Wanhangdu Road)
- Via: Yuyuan Road, Jing'an Temple, West Nanjing Road, People's Square
- End: Hankou Road & Middle Sichuan Road
- Length: 7.7km
- Stops: 19 (towards Zhongshan Park (Wanhangdu Road)); 13 (towards Hankou Road & Middle Sichuan Road)
- Competition: 2 , bus route 37

Service
- Frequency: 2-3 minutes (peak hour); 5-10 minutes (non peak hour)
- Daily ridership: 13000 (2019)

Trolleybus Route 20 is a trolleybus route in Shanghai, China. It started operations on 27 September 1928, and runs between Zhongshan Park (Wanhangdu Road) in Changning District and Hankou Road & Middle Sichuan Road in Huangpu District. It is operated by Shanghai Ba-Shi No.1 Public Transportation Co. Ltd.

Route 20 is one of Shanghai's most famous and popular bus routes, with a rich history and a route that passes many major landmarks. It is estimated that as many as 9 out of 10 Shanghai residents have ridden the route. The route is frequently covered in Chinese-language media as a result of the bus operator's publicity efforts.

== History ==
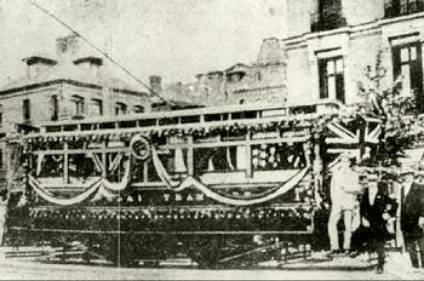
Yingshang No. 1 tram in 1908

The Yingshang No. 1 tram route, a predecessor to Trolleybus Route 20, was opened by the British Shanghai Tramways on 21 January 1908 and ran between the Jing'an Temple and The Bund.

Trolleybus Route 20 opened on 27 September 1928, initially operating between Zhongshan Park and the Jing'an Temple. After the removal of tram tracks along Nanjing Road in 1963, Yingshang No. 1 was merged into Route 20, forming a single trolleybus route that ran between Zhongshan Park and The Bund.

In 1999, after part of East Nanjing Road was converted to a pedestrian-only shopping street, Route 20 was rerouted to skip the segment via Jiujiang Road.

In 2019, to celebrate the 70th anniversary of the founding of the People's Republic of China, all 25 trolleybuses running along the route were decorated with pictures depicting the history of the route. That year, it was estimated that as many as 9 out of 10 Shanghai residents had ridden on the route.

In the same year, after the entire East Nanjing Road was made pedestrian-only, the terminus was shifted from Jiujiang Road & East Zhongshan Road No.1 to Hankou Road & Middle Sichuan Road.

== Fleet ==
As of May 2023, the route runs on a fleet of 22 Sunwin SWB5129BEV77G trolleybuses. These buses bear a blue retro livery, commemorating the heritage of trams and trolleybuses in Shanghai. Unlike other trolleybuses of the same type, those on Route 20 have a line of text saying "Since 1928", alluding to the year the route was introduced. These buses were piloted in July 2022 and entered service in September.

=== Fleet history ===
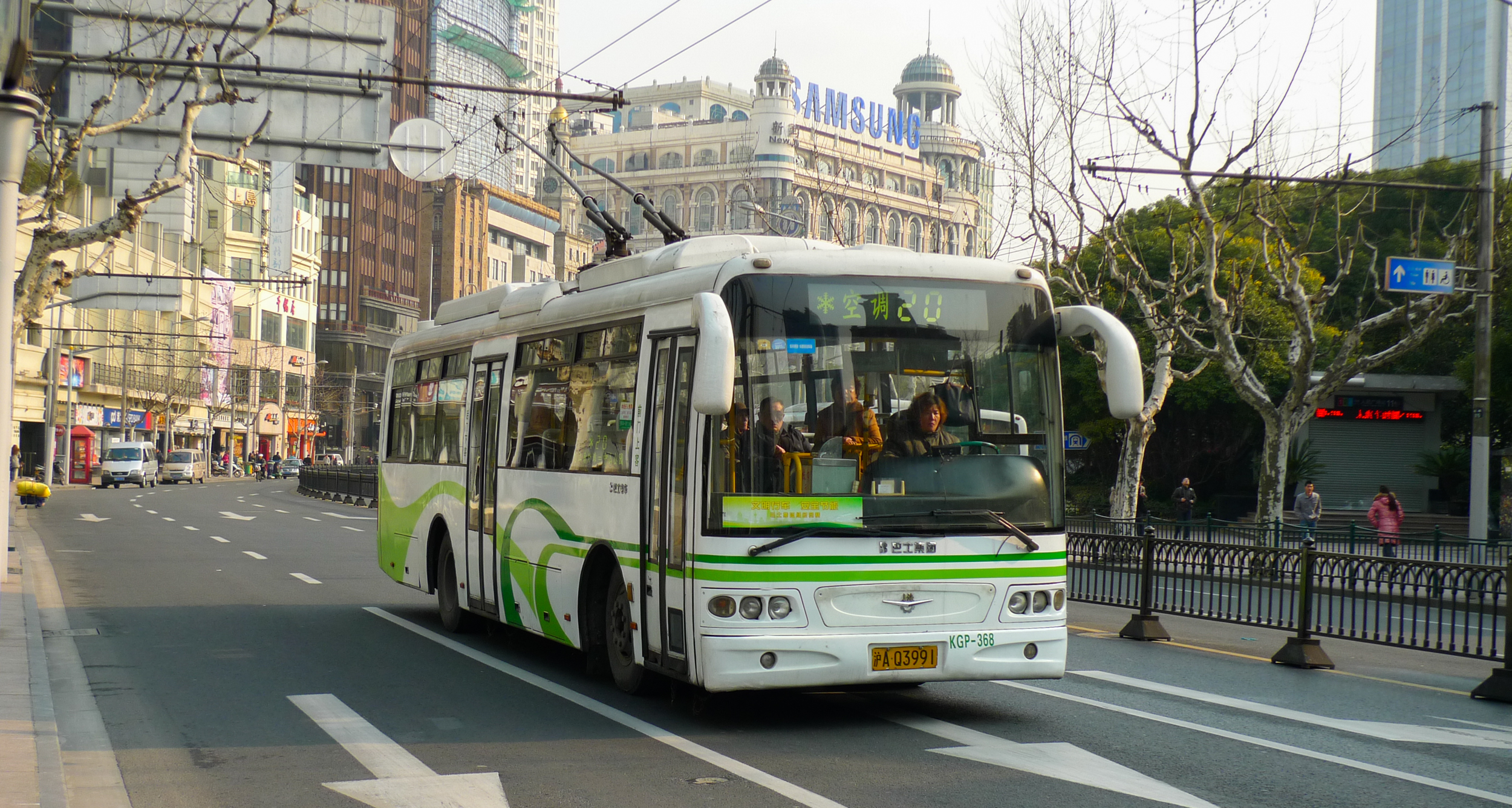
Shanghai SWB5105KGP-3 in 2012

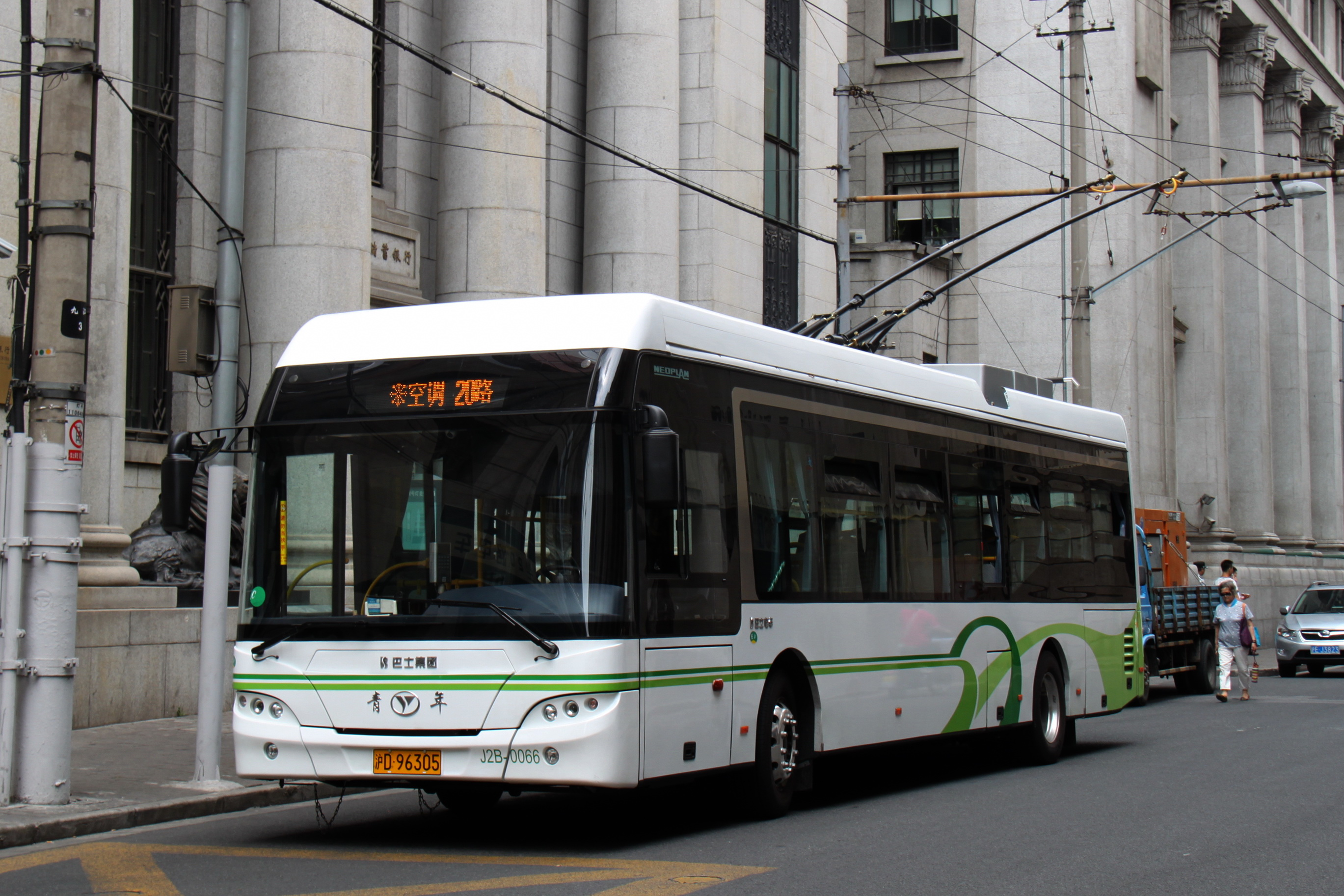
Youngman trolleybus at Jiujiang Road terminus in 2014

Before Route 20 merged with Yingshang No. 1, the route used 8TR rigid trolleybuses imported from Czechoslovakia, as well as locally built Dahongqi 5000 series trolleybuses.

Key developments in the route's fleet include:

- 1963: first SKD663 articulated trolleybus entered service on route 20. These would be used for over 15 years, only being replaced in the 1980s. In addition, SK661 trolleybuses were introduced in the 1970s.
- 1984: the route started using a full fleet of Shanghai SK561GF and SK570 articulated trolleybuses. At this point of time, the route was so popular that daily ridership reached over 70,000, requiring over 65 buses running per day on 30-second headways.
- 1990s: air-conditioned trolleybuses began entering service on the route.
- 2004: Shanghai SWB5105KGP-3 and Xianfei HZGWG100K trolleybuses introduced.
- 2014: Newer Youngman trolleybuses entered service; these were retired in September 2022 when the retro-style Sunwin trolleybuses entered service.

== Route information ==
Route 20, like many other bus routes in downtown Shanghai, charges a flat fare of RMB2. Interchange discounts using the Shanghai Public Transport Card is applicable.

The route passes by the following landmarks, listed from west (Zhongshan Park) to east (Hankou Road & Middle Sichuan Road):

- Zhongshan Park & 2 3 4 Zhongshan Park
- East China University of Political Science and Law Changning Campus
- Longemont
- People's Government of Changning District
- 2 11 Jiangsu Road
- Jing'an Temple, Jing'an Park & 2 7 14 Jing'an Temple
- Jiuguang
- Shanghai Wheelock Square
- Jing An Kerry Centre
- Shanghai Exhibition Centre
- Shanghai Centre
- Plaza 66
- Westgate Mall
- 2 12 13 West Nanjing Road
- Shanghai Media Group Building
- HKRI Taikoo Hui
- Zhangyuan
- People's Square, People's Park & 1 2 8 People's Square
- People's Government of Shanghai Municipality Building
- Shanghai Museum
- Shanghai Grand Theatre
- Grand Cinema
- Park Hotel
- May Thirtieth Movement Monument
- Shanghai History Museum (Shanghai Revolution Museum)
- New World City
- Shanghai No. 1 Department Store
- Nanjing Road Pedestrian Street & 2 10 East Nanjing Road
- The Bund

== See also ==
- Transport in Shanghai
- Trolleybuses in Shanghai
