= Transport in Shanghai =

Transport in Shanghai is provided by an extensive network of modes including metro, cycling, bus (incl. trolley bus) and taxis, as well as an expansive network of roadways, and airports. Shanghai has invested heavily in public transportation before and after the 2010 World Expo, including the construction of the Hongqiao transportation hub of high-speed rail, air, metro and bus routes.

Public transport is the major mode of transport in Shanghai as limitations on car purchases were introduced in 1994 in order to limit the growth of automobile traffic and alleviate congestion. New private cars cannot be driven without a license plate, which are sold in monthly license plate auctions which is only accessible for locally registered residents and those who have paid social insurance or individual income taxes for over three years. Around 9,500 license plates are auctioned each month, and the average price is about CN¥89,600 (US$12,739) in 2019. Shanghai (population of 25 million) has over four million cars on the road, the fifth-largest number of any Chinese city. Despite this the city remains plagued by congestion and vehicle pollution.

The coverage of operating costs from the ticket revenue of Shanghai metro lines 1 and 2 was over 100% in the years 2000 to 2003. In 2004, the average daily passenger flow of rail transit was 1.32 million trips, taking up 10.9% of the total public passenger traffic in the city, an increase of 6 percentage points from 3.8% in 2000. The results of the "2011 Shanghai Public Transport Passenger Flow Survey" released by the Municipal Transportation and Port Bureau showed that the city's public transport travel time was gradually reduced. The average travel distance of public transport in 2011 was 8.5 kilometers, the travel time 50.8 minutes per trip and the travel cost of public transport is gradually reduced: in 2011, the cost of rail transit was 2.4 yuan per trip, down 14% from 2005; the cost of bus and tram trips was 1.8 yuan, down 5% from 2005. Metro accounted for 33% of the public transport passenger volume.

In 2018 the public transportation system handled a total of 16.05 million rides on average each day, among which 10.17 million (63%) were made via the Metro and 5.76 million (36%) via buses. Shanghai expressway traffic volume was 1.215 million vehicles on an average day.

== Airports ==
Shanghai is served by two airports: Shanghai Hongqiao International Airport and Shanghai Pudong International Airport. Pudong International Airport is the primary international airport, while Hongqiao International Airport mainly operates domestic flights with limited short-haul international flights.

Shanghai Hongqiao International Airport opened in May 1923 and was the only primary airport of Shanghai. During the 1990s, the expansion of Hongqiao Airport to meet growing demand became impossible as the surrounding urban area was developing significantly, and an alternative to assume all international flights had to be sought. Shanghai Pudong International Airport opened on 1 October 1999. In 2019 Shanghai Pudong International Airport was the second busiest airport in China with 76 million passengers and Shanghai Hongqiao International Airport was the eight busiest airport in China with 45 million passengers (source: List of the busiest airports in China).

== Railways ==
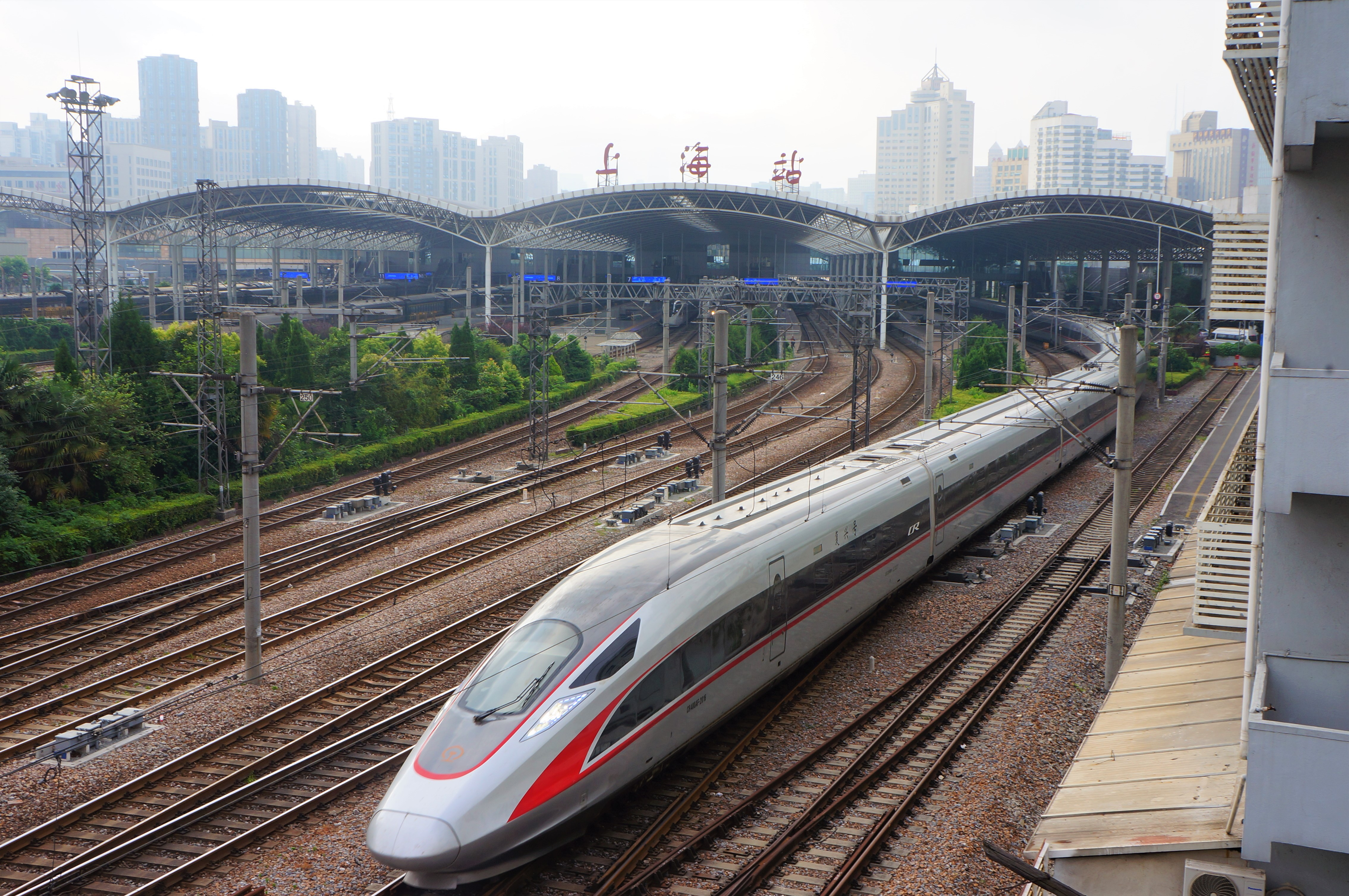
A CR400AF bullet train departing from Shanghai railway station

Shanghai has four major railway stations: Shanghai railway station, Shanghai South railway station, Shanghai West railway station, and Shanghai Hongqiao railway station. All are connected to the metro network and serve as hubs in the railway network of China.

Shanghai has four high-speed railways (HSRs): Beijing–Shanghai HSR (overlaps with Shanghai–Wuhan–Chengdu passenger railway) (opened in 2011), Shanghai–Nanjing intercity railway, Shanghai–Kunming HSR, and Shanghai–Nantong railway. One HSR is under construction: Shanghai–Suzhou–Huzhou HSR.

Built in 1876, the Woosung railway was the first railway in Shanghai and the first railway in operation in China By 1909, Shanghai–Nanjing railway and Shanghai–Hangzhou railway were in service. As of October 2019, the two railways have been integrated into two main railways in China: Beijing–Shanghai railway (or Jinghu Railway passing through Nanjing) and Shanghai–Kunming railway (or Huhang Railway passing through Hangzhou), respectively.

== Shanghai Rail Transit ==
Shanghai Rail Transit was established on May 28, 1993, when Shanghai Metro Line 1 opened. It is mainly consisted of High-volume railway system, Low-to-medium-volume railway system and Maglev system.

== Trams ==
Shanghai's first generation trams operated between 1908 and 1975.

The Zhangjiang Tram opened in 2009, using French Translohr rubber-tired trams.

The Songjiang Tram opened in 2018, and is a modern light rail system with 2 lines.

The Lingang DRT opened in 2021, and is an Autonomous Rail Rapid Transit (ART) system with three lines.

== Bus ==
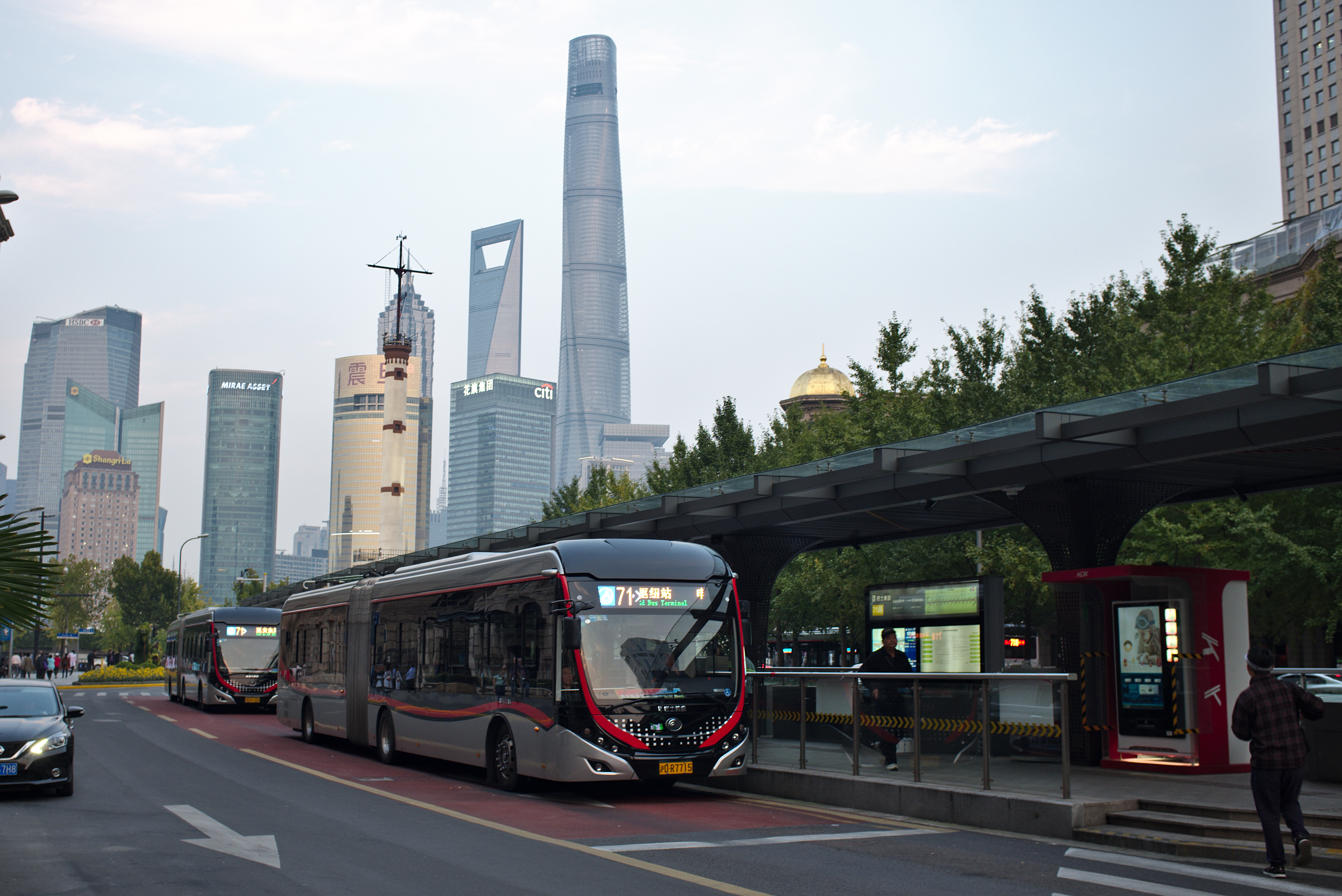
Shanghai Bus Route 71 in the Bund

Shanghai has one of the world's most extensive bus systems with nearly one thousand bus lines, operated by numerous transportation companies. Opened in 1914, Shanghai has the world's oldest continuously operating trolley bus system, with 13 routes in operation in 2017. Not all of Shanghai's bus routes are numbered - some have names exclusively in Chinese. Bus fares are usually ¥2, sometimes higher or lower, while Metro fares run from ¥3 to ¥16 depending on distance.

Shanghai has expanded its eco-friendly bus fleet in the 2010s. The goal was to have to 3,000 units by 2015 and to increase the percentage of its new energy buses to its total bus fleet to 30%. From 2014, the number of energy-saving and environmentally friendly buses should account for over 60% of its newly purchased bus fleet.

In 2018, there were 1,543 bus routes. Bus-only lanes reached 363.7 kilometers.

== Ferry ==
The Shanghai Ferry (Chinese:市轮渡) is a system of ferry routes across the Huangpu River in Shanghai. The ferry service started on January 5, 1911 by the municipal authorities in Pudong. Before the 1970s, the ferry service was the only way to cross the Huangpu River. In the 1980s, the Shanghai Ferry became one of the busiest ferry services in the world. In the 1990s, as bridges and tunnels across the Huangpu river were built, the ferry service saw a sharp drop in ridership. The Shanghai Ferry currently consists of 18 ferry lines and is operated by the state-owned Shanghai Ferry Company.

== Taxi ==
Before the rapid expansion of the metro, driving a taxi used to be well-paid. Nowadays, it is hard to find people willing to work long hours in a taxi, with the profit margin for each cab much smaller than before. Taxi transportation in Shanghai are offered by 6 major taxi groups.

- 强生出租 (Qiangsheng Taxi) is the biggest taxi company in Shanghai, they operate green and yellow taxis. They also operate a small fleet of accessible golden "London Taxis", making them the only company in Shanghai to operate accessible taxis.
- 海博出租 (Haibo Taxi) operate blue taxis. They operate a small fleet of Roewe all-electric taxis.
- 大众出租 (People's Taxi) operate light cyan taxis over Shanghai. They are the official taxi carrier of the 2010 Shanghai EXPO
- 锦江出租 (Jinjiang Taxi) is a subsidiary of the Shanghai Jinjiang International holdings. They operate white taxis all across Shanghai.
- 蓝色联盟 (Blue Alliance) is a major taxi group consisting of about 15 smaller taxi companies, they operate under the brand Blue Alliance, but all have their own branding on the back of the for-hire sign. They operate dark blue taxis in central Shanghai.
- 法兰红 (French Red) is another taxi group consisting of about 10 smaller taxi companies. They function the same as Blue Alliance, and operate orange taxis in central Shanghai.

Taxi fare is regulated by Shanghai Government.

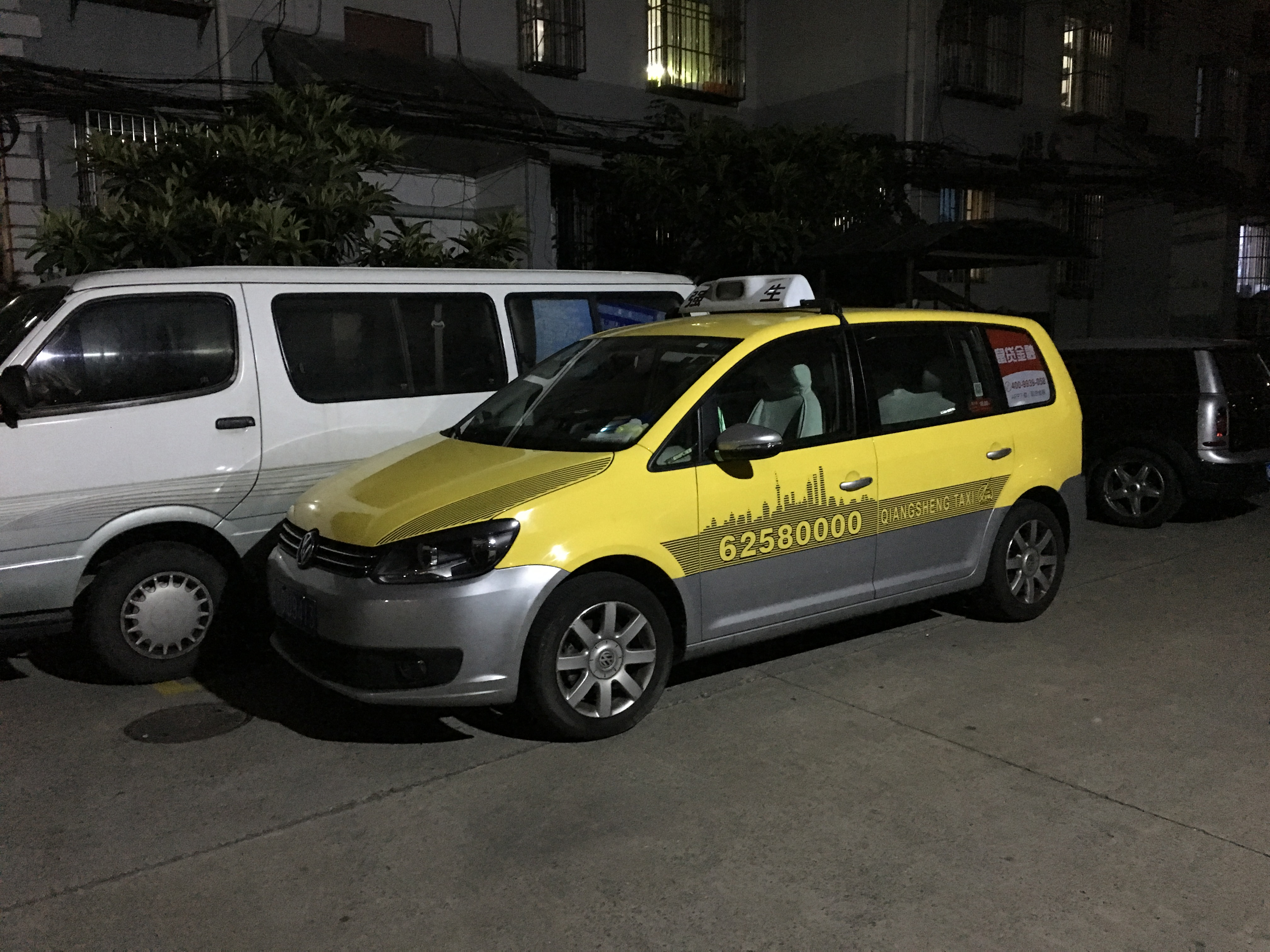
A typical VW Touran Taxi in Shanghai, operated by Qiangsheng.

Regulated taxi rate in Shanghai
Regulated taxi fare	Daytime 5am to 11pm	Night 11pm-5am +30%	
First 3 km	¥14 (sedan) - ¥18 (MPV)	¥18.2 (sedan) - ¥23.4 (MPV)	
	Standard rate: -weekdays 7pm-7am -weekends	Peak +5%: -weekdays 7am-10am -weekdays 4pm-7pm	Daytime -5%: -weekdays 10am-4pm
3–15 km	¥2.7/km	¥2.835/km	¥2.565/km
More than 15 km +50%	¥4.05/km	¥4.25/km	¥3.85/km

Waiting/low speed has a charge for every 4 minutes equal to that for 1.5 km:

- When the car speed is under 12 km/h;
- If the passenger asks the taxi driver to park somewhere while waiting for him or her.

Holiday surcharge:

- 10 yuan for each ride during the Spring Festival holiday;
- 5 yuan for each ride during the National Day and Labor Day holidays and if the Mid-Autumn Festival holiday happens to join the National Day holiday.

This means that if you take a taxi for 15 km, with the first 3 km charged at 16 yuan and with no surcharge for waiting time, you will pay 50 yuan during morning and evening hours on weekdays, about 46 yuan between 10am to 4pm on the same days, and 48.4 yuan otherwise.

== Transportation card ==
All public transport within Shanghai can be paid for using the contactless Shanghai Public Transportation Card (SPTC). With this card the holder can benefit from the transfer discount policy: when the cardholder takes a different suburban/bus/metro/tram within a 120-minute period from first touch-in, the second trip is discounted by 1 RMB.

== See also ==
- List of airports in Shanghai
- List of metro systems
- List of tram and light rail transit systems
