= Shanghai Trolleybus Route 14 =

Trolleybus route in Shanghai, China

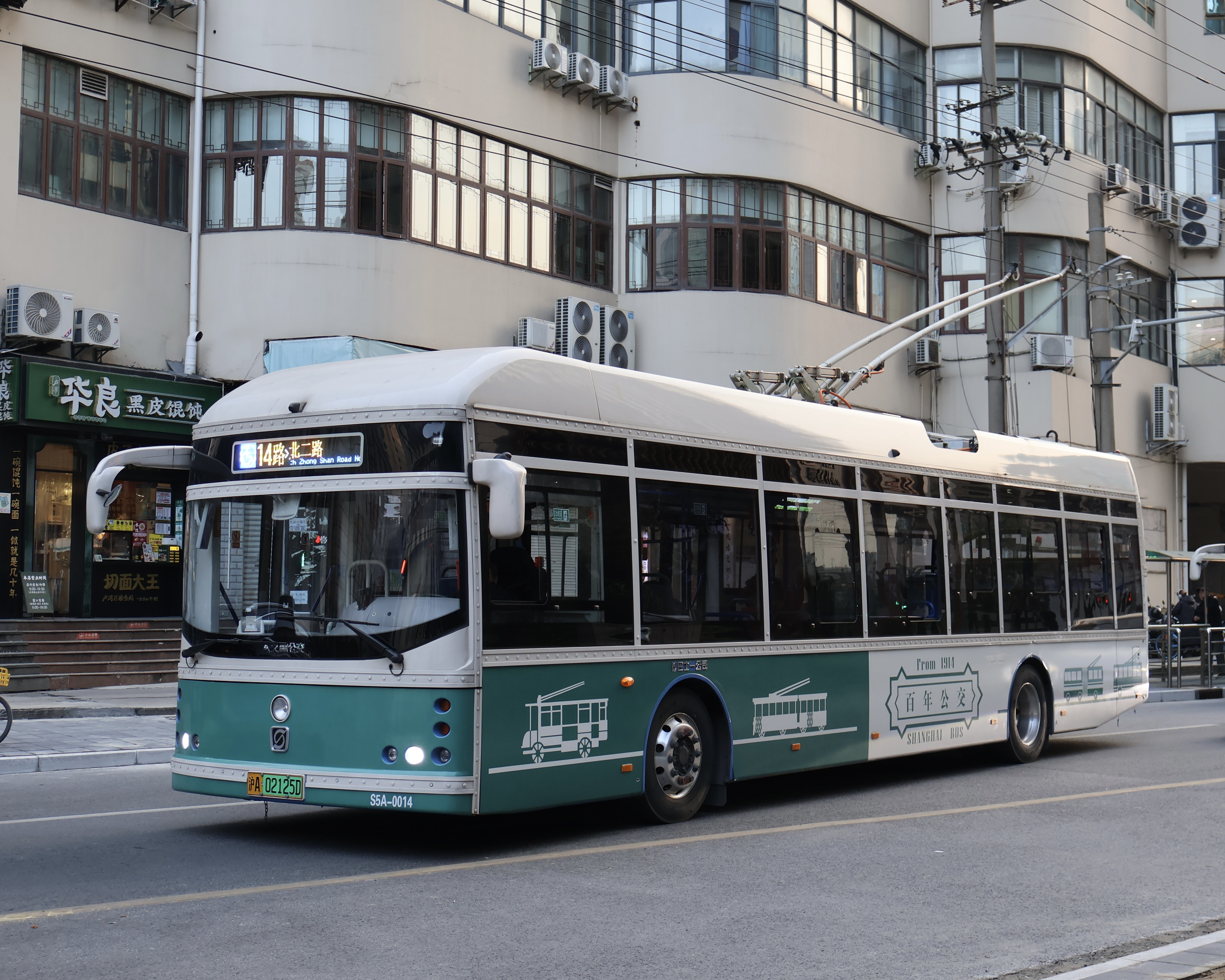
- A Sunwin iEV12T on route 14 departing Dongxinqiao in December 2024

Overview
- Operator: Shanghai Ba-Shi No.1 Public Transportation Co. Ltd (巴士一公司)
- Vehicle: Sunwin iEV12T
- Began service: 15 November 1914

Route
- Route type: Trolleybus Route
- Start: Jiangpu Road & North Zhongshan Road No.2
- End: Dongxinqiao
- Length: 9.45km
- Stops: 20 (towards Dongxinqiao); 18 (towards Jiangpu Road & North No.2 Zhongshan Road)
- Competition: 10

Service
- Frequency: 2-3 minutes (peak hour); 5-15 minutes (non peak hour)
- Operates: 04:30-23:45

Trolleybus Route 14 is a trolleybus route in Shanghai, China. Having started operations on 15 November 1914, it holds the records of being the first trolleybus route in China, as well as the oldest trolleybus route still in operation worldwide. The route is operated by Shanghai Ba-Shi No.1 Public Transportation Co. Ltd, and currently operates between Jiangpu Road & North Zhongshan Road No.2 in Yangpu District and Dongxinqiao in Huangpu District.

== History ==
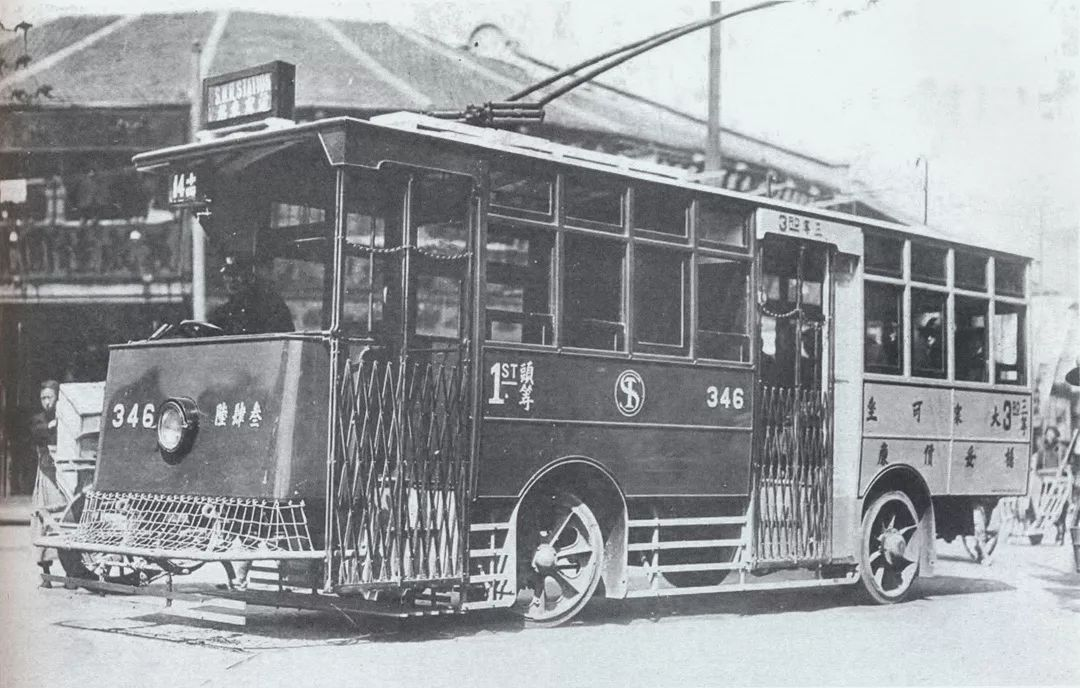
A trolleybus on route 14 in 1925.

The route started operations on 15 November 1914 by the British-owned Shanghai Tramway Company, operating between Zhengjiamuqiao (郑家木桥, present day Middle Fujian Road & East Yan'an Road junction) and Laozhaqiao (老闸桥, present day Middle Fujian Road & East Beijing Road junction), with a total length of 1.127km. It was the first trolleybus route in Shanghai and also China, and is currently the oldest trolleybus route still operating worldwide.

In 1916, the route was extended northbound to Tianhougong Bridge (天后宫桥, present day Henan Road), and then to Shanghai North Railway Station in 1925. The route would be extended further southbound to Boulevard des Deux Republiques (present day Renmin Road) in 1926, and northbound to Honan Road in 1927.

On 5 September 1937, the route was shortened to operate between Honan Road Bridge and Zhengjiamuqiao due to the Battle of Shanghai. It would return to its original terminus at Shanghai North Railway Station on 5 November that year.

In 1951, the southern terminus was extended back to Renmin Road, and then to Laoximen in 1954. The northern terminus would be extended to Quanjia'an Road (全家庵路, present day North Linping Road) in 1958, bringing the length of the route to 7.864km.

In 1988, the southern terminus was changed to Dongxinqiao (东新桥), which the route still terminates at today.

The route was extended to Benxi Road (本溪路) in Yangpu District, via Kongjiang Road (控江路) and Jiangpu Road (江浦路) in 1999. It would be further extended to its present day northern terminus at Jiangpu Road & North Zhongshan Road No.2 in 2001.

== Fleet ==
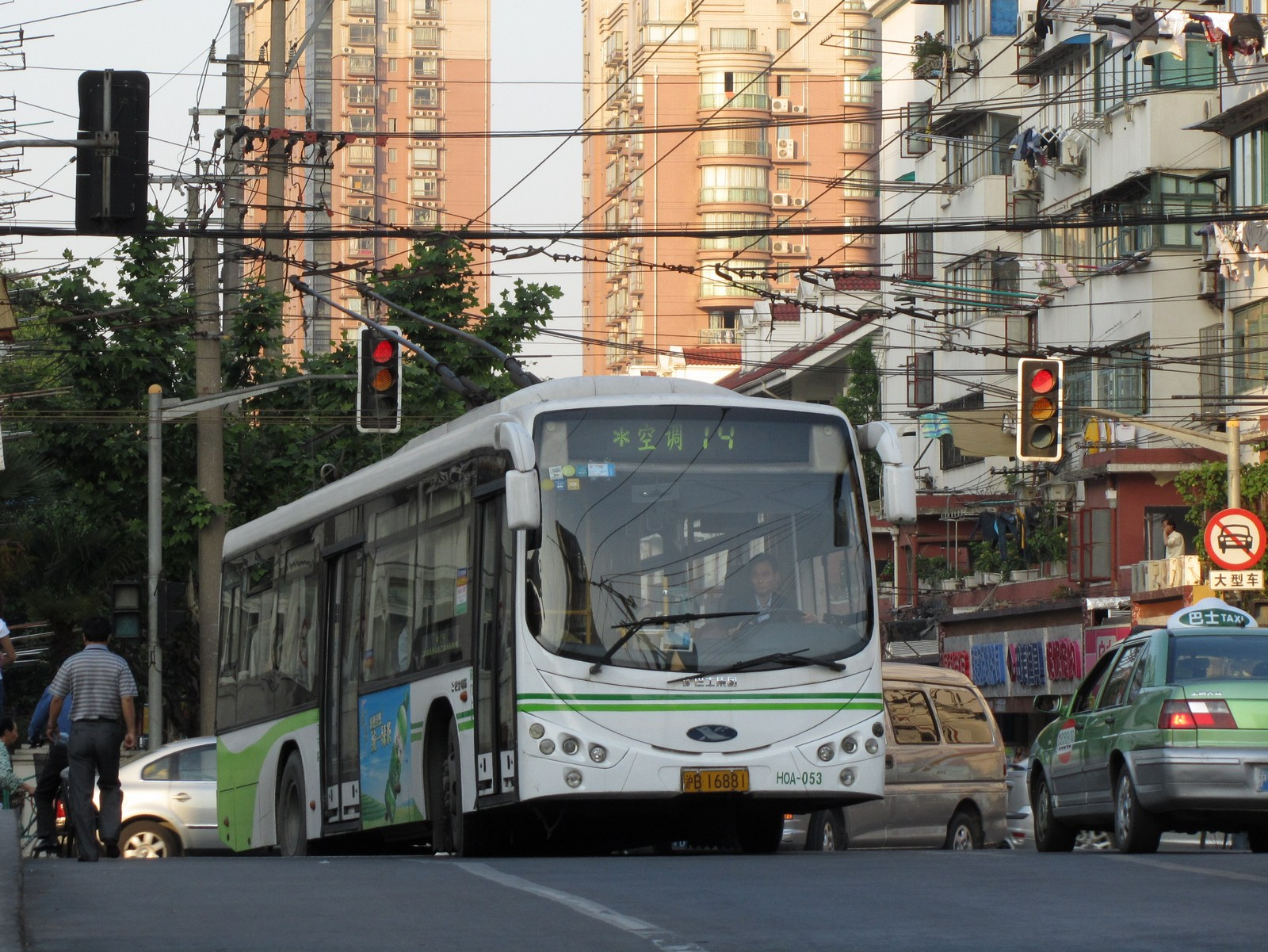
Xianfei HZKWG100K trolleybus on route 14 in 2010.

As of May 2023, route 14 uses a fleet of Sunwin SWB5129BEV77G (iEV12T) trolleybuses. These buses bear a blue retro style livery, commemorating the heritage of trolleybuses in Shanghai.

=== Fleet history ===
During the 1950s, trolleybuses that ran on the route were EMB603T models. Those were replaced by Shanghai SKD663 articulated buses by the 1970s.

The trolleybus fleet were replaced again in 1980s, using Shanghai SK561GF articulated buses.

Articulated trolleybuses were removed from route 14 in 1998, being replaced by Shanghai SK5105GP rigid trolleybuses.

Air conditioned Shanghai SWB5105KGP and Xianfei HZGWG100K trolleybuses were introduced in 2004. The last non air-conditioned trolleybuses were retired by 2009.

In 2014, Youngman JNP6120BEV1 and JNP-WG120G trolleybuses entirely replaced the previous fleet of trolleybuses and diesel buses. Those left the fleet in January 2023, having been replaced by the current fleet of trolleybuses.

== Route information ==
Route 14, like many other bus routes in downtown Shanghai, charges a flat fare of RMB2. Interchange discounts using the Shanghai Public Transport Card is applicable.

The route passes by the following landmarks, listed from Jiangpu Road & North No.2 Zhongshan Road Terminus towards Dongxinqiao:

- Tongji University
- Xinhua Hospital
- 8 Anshan Xincun station
- Heping Park
- 10 Youdian Xincun station
- 4 10 Hailun Road station
- Shanghai General Hospital
- Former Shanghai North railway station
- 3 4 Baoshan Road station
- 10 12 Tiantong Road station
- Nanjing Road Pedestrian Street & 2 10 East Nanjing Road station
- 1 2 8 People's Square station
