= Yan'an Road Medium Capacity Bus Transit System =

Bus rapid transit system in Shanghai, China

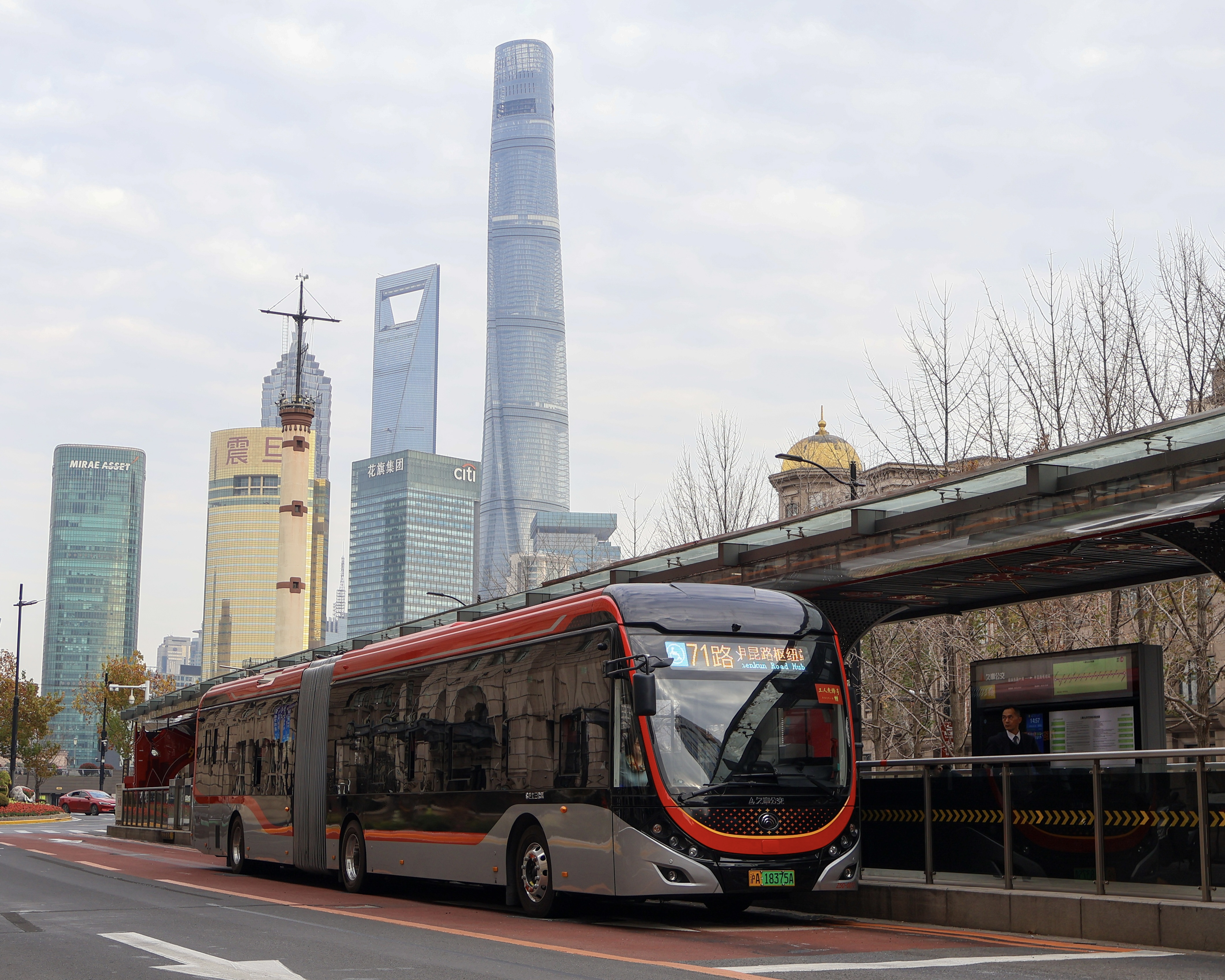
- A bus on the main route 71 at East Yan'an Road & The Bund terminus.

Overview
- System: Trolleybus; Bus rapid transit
- Operator: Shanghai Bus No.3 Public Transport Co., Ltd. (巴士三公司)
- Vehicle: Yutong ZK5180A (main route); Yutong ZK5120C (partial route); Yutong ZK5125C (partial route); Yutong E12 (branch lines)
- Began service: 1 February 2017

Route
- Route type: Medium Capacity Bus Rapid Transit
- Start: East Yan'an Road & The Bund
- Via: Yan'an Road, Huqingping Highway
- End: Shenkun Road Bus Terminal
- Length: 17.5km (main route)
- Stops: 25 (main route); 22 (partial route)
Route map

Yan'an Road Medium Capacity Transit
- Simplified Chinese: 延安路中运量
- Traditional Chinese: 延安路中運量
Transcriptions
Standard Mandarin
- Hanyu Pinyin: Yán'ān lù zhōng yùn liàng

The Yan'an Road Medium Capacity Bus Transit System (Chinese: 延安路中运量; pinyin: Yán'ān lù zhōng yùn liàng) is a bus rapid transit system operating within Shanghai, China. The network consists of a main route, a partial route and four branch lines, with the main route running between East Yan'an Road & The Bund in Huangpu District and Shenkun Road Bus Terminal in Minhang District via Yan'an Road. The system is operated by Shanghai Bus No.3 Public Transport Co., Ltd., and began trial operations on 1 February 2017.

== Routes ==
The system consists of the following routes:

- Route 71 (71路), running between East Yan'an Road & The Bund and Shenkun Road Bus Terminal.
- Partial route 71 (71路区间), running between North Huangpi Road and Fenghong Road.
- Route 1250 (1250路), also known as Branch Line 1 (71路支线1), running between Dingxi Road and Shuangliu Road & Tianshan Road, and connects to the main route at Dingxi Road and Kaixuan Road stations.
- Route 1251 (1251路), also known as Branch Line 2 (71路支线2), running between Kaixuan Road and Shuicheng Road & Xianxia Road, and connects to the main route at Kaixuan Road station.
- Route 748 (748路), also known as Branch Line 3 (71路支线3), running between Jiuting and Shanghai Zoo (Hongjing Road), and connects to the main route at Hangdong Road, Hangxin Road and Wubao Road stations.
- Route 71T2 (71路T2线), formerly route 835, running from Shenkun Road Bus Terminal and Fenghong Road.

== History ==
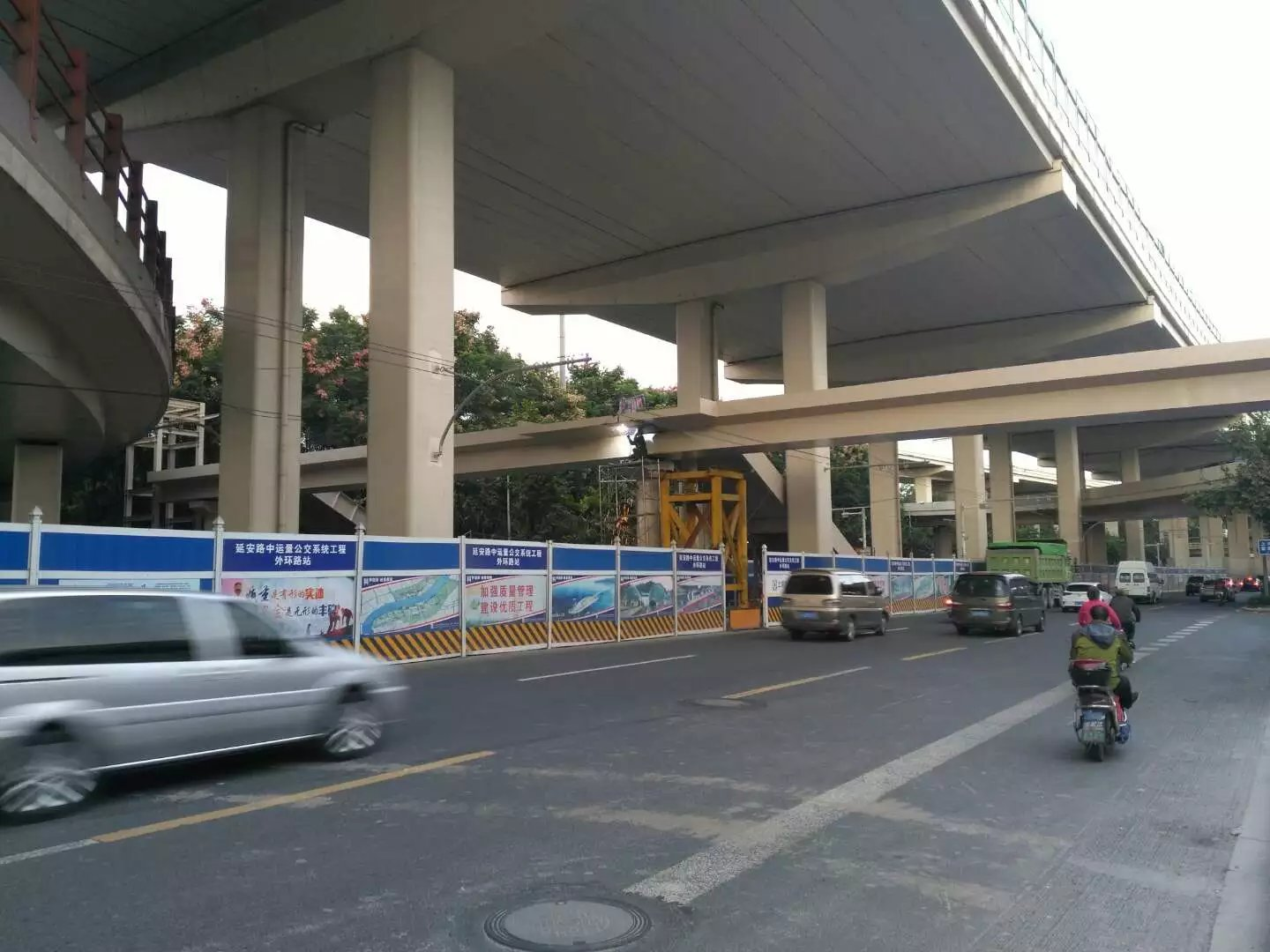
Construction of Waihuan Road Station in October 2016

The construction of the system began in 2016. The line was designed to use trolleybuses, with overhead lines covering 80% of the main line. The system will use a dedicated bus lane under the Yan'an Elevated Road, as well as separate traffic lights from other traffic along Yan'an Road. Most stops are placed in the middle of the road, with an average of 730 metres between stops.

The system officially began trial operations on February 1, 2017. It reused the route number 71, which followed a similar path from Huangpu to Changning districts along Yan'an Road. The original route 71 was shortened on the same day and renumbered route 1250.

In May 2017, the operator noted that it was considering the possibility of using buses with doors on both sides in order to allow commuters to seamlessly transfer to route 71. These plans were put in place in December the same year, with routes 1250 and 1251 joining the medium capacity network as branch lines and becoming the first bus routes in Shanghai to use these buses.

In addition to the branch lines, in August 2017, route 835 opened as a connecting line to the rest of the network, in order to connect commuters between the medium capacity transit system and Hongqiao International Airport. This line would later be renamed route 71T2 in 2019.

On December 28, 2019, route 748 was rerouted and joined the network as Branch Line 3, connecting the network to Jiuting and Shanghai Zoo.

In February 2022, it was announced the partial route 71 will receive a further extension westbound to Hongqiao Business District with Fenghong Road becoming the new terminus., adding 11 stops to the route. This extension took place on 3 November 2023. On the same day, route 71T2 was amended as well to serve Fenghong Road.

== Fleet ==
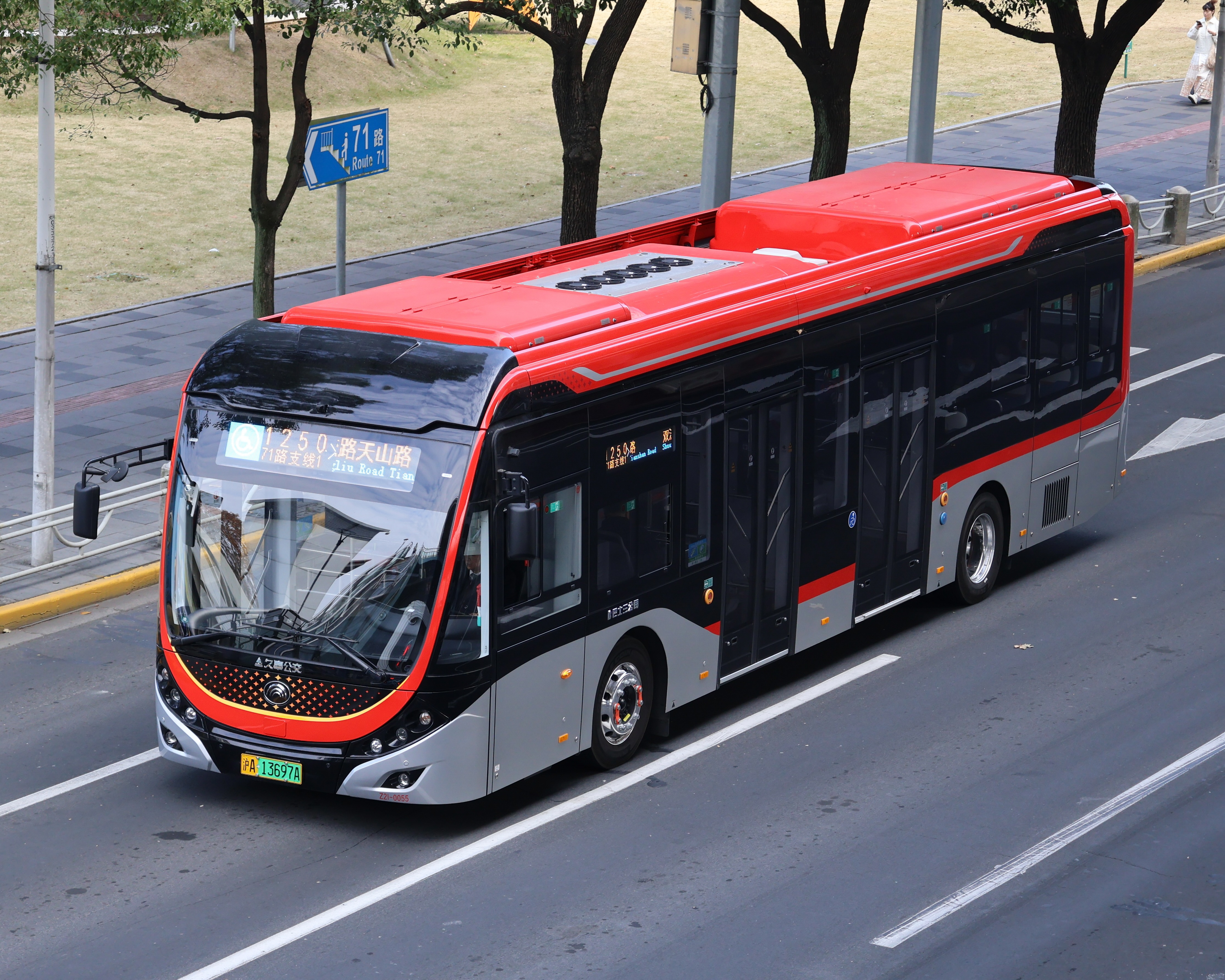
The branch lines, such as route 1250 (pictured), use battery electric Yutong E12 buses with doors on both sides.

Since the introduction of the system, the entire network uses a fleet of low floor Yutong buses. The main route 71 and the partial route 71 uses articulated Yutong ZK5180A and rigid ZK5120C/ZK5125C trolleybuses respectively. These buses have doors located on the left side of the bus only.

The branch lines and route 71T2 use rigid battery electric Yutong E12 buses with doors on both sides to be able to stop at both regular stations and stops along the network.

The buses feature a silver body, a black-painted front and red stripes running through the fuselage. They are equipped with a wheelchair bay and LCD passenger information display, with announcement systems in Standard Chinese, Shanghainese and English.

== Stations ==
This is a list of stations along the Yan'an Road Medium Capacity Bus Transit System. This list only contains the stops along the main & partial routes 71, and do not contain the stops for the branch lines. The main line is 17.5 km long, while the partial line is 25.1 km long.

All buses stop at stations labelled ● allow both alighting and boarding. Stops labelled as ■ are for boarding only, while those labelled as ▲ are for alighting only. If the stop is labelled as ｜, the line does not serve that stop.

Stations

Station Name		Stopping		Transfer	Notes
English	Chinese	Main route	Partial route	Transfer	Notes
East Yan'an Road & The Bund	延安东路外滩	●	｜		
Middle Henan Road	河南中路	●	｜	10 14 (Yuyuan Garden)	Towards Yan'an Road (E) The Bund Station only
Middle Xizang Road	西藏中路	●	｜	8 14 (Dashijie)	
North Huangpi Road	黄陂北路	｜	▲	1 2 8 (People's Square) 1 14 (Site of the First CPC National Congress · South Huangpi Road)	Terminus and alighting stop of the partial line, located along Wusheng Road
North Huangpi Road	黄陂北路	●	■	1 2 8 (People's Square) 1 14 (Site of the First CPC National Congress · South Huangpi Road)	Start of the partial line, located along East Yan'an Road
North Chengdu Road	成都北路	●	●		
North Maoming Road	茂名北路	●	●	2 13 (West Nanjing Road) 13 (Middle Huaihai Road)	
Shanghai Exhibition Centre	上海展览中心	●	●		
Changde Road	常德路	●	●	2 7 14 (Jing'an Temple)	
Huashan Road	华山路	●	●	2 7 14 (Jing'an Temple)	
Zhenning Road	镇宁路	●	●		
Jiangsu Road	江苏路	●	●		
Panyu Road	番禺路	●	●		
Dingxi Road	定西路	●	●	Route 1250 (Branch Line 1)	
Kaixuan Road	凯旋路	●	●	3 4 (West Yan'an Road) Route 1250 (Branch Line 1), 1251 (Branch Line 2)	
Loushanguan Road	娄山关路	●	●	10 (Yili Road)	
South Shuicheng Road	水城南路	●	●	10 (Shuicheng Road)	
Hongxu Road	虹许路	●	●		
Hongmei Road	虹梅路	●	●	10 (Longxi Road)	
Jianhe Road	剑河路	●	●		
Hongjing Road	虹井路	●	●	10 (Shanghai Zoo)	
Waihuan Road	外环路	●	●		
Hangdong Road	航东路	●	●	Route 748 (Branch Line 3)	
Hangxin Road	航新路	●	●	Route 748 (Branch Line 3)	
Wubao Road	吴宝路	●	●	Route 748 (Branch Line 3)	
Shenkun Road Bus Terminal	申昆路枢纽站	●	｜	Route 71T2	
Huaxiang Road	华翔路	｜	●		
Lanhong Road	兰虹路	｜	●		
Yonghong Road	甬虹路	｜	●		
Shaohong Road (Hongqiao Hub)	绍虹路（虹桥枢纽站）	｜	●	2 10 17 (Hongqiao Railway Station) AOH	
Xihong Road	锡虹路	｜	●		
Xinghong Road	兴虹路	｜	●		
Ninghong Road	宁虹路	｜	●		
West Tianshan Road	天山西路	｜	●		
Shenkun Road	申昆路	｜	●		
Fenghong Road	丰虹路	｜	●	Route 71T2	

== Controversy ==
During the planning and construction of the system, there were plans to adjust a total of 22 bus routes, including the original route 71 and other major bus routes running along Yan'an Road, such as routes 127, 925 and 936. As these routes were on the verge of being axed multiple times, there was fierce opposition against the plans to cut these bus routes. It was reported in 2015 that at one point, the number of complaints regarding the cancellation of route 127 to the service hotline of the bus operator reached over 300 within a few days.

The system has been plagued by the slow speed of operation, with buses operating at an average of only 15 km/h. This is in spite of the designated bus lane, which was frequently obstructed by jaywalkers and vehicles running red lights. In addition, due to the slower speed of operation, nearly 60% of the estimated timings for the priority traffic lights did not match the actual arrival timings of the buses, practically rendering the system obsolete.

Despite the system not being operational between midnight and 4 a.m., the dedicated bus lanes are restricted 24/7, and do not allow any other vehicles to travel on these lanes even during non-operational hours. Because of the raise in car-ownership in China, often resulting in congested streets, the bus lanes and bus priority measures allow to keep public transport running reliably and ensuring some transport capacity with congested-free BRT buses. This has sparked calls from some netizens for the bus lanes to be open to regular traffic during non-operations hours as well as non-peak hours.

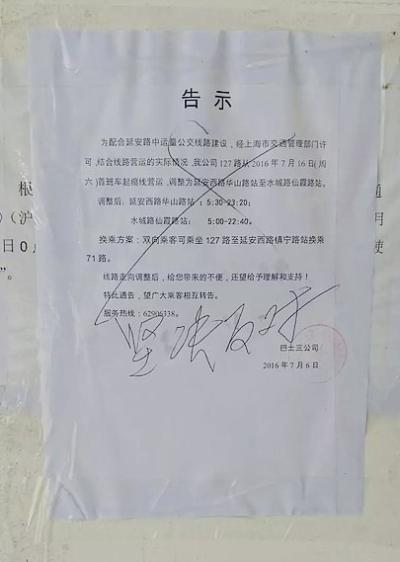
Notice for the shortening of bus route 127. The Chinese writing "坚决反对" translates to "fiercely oppose".

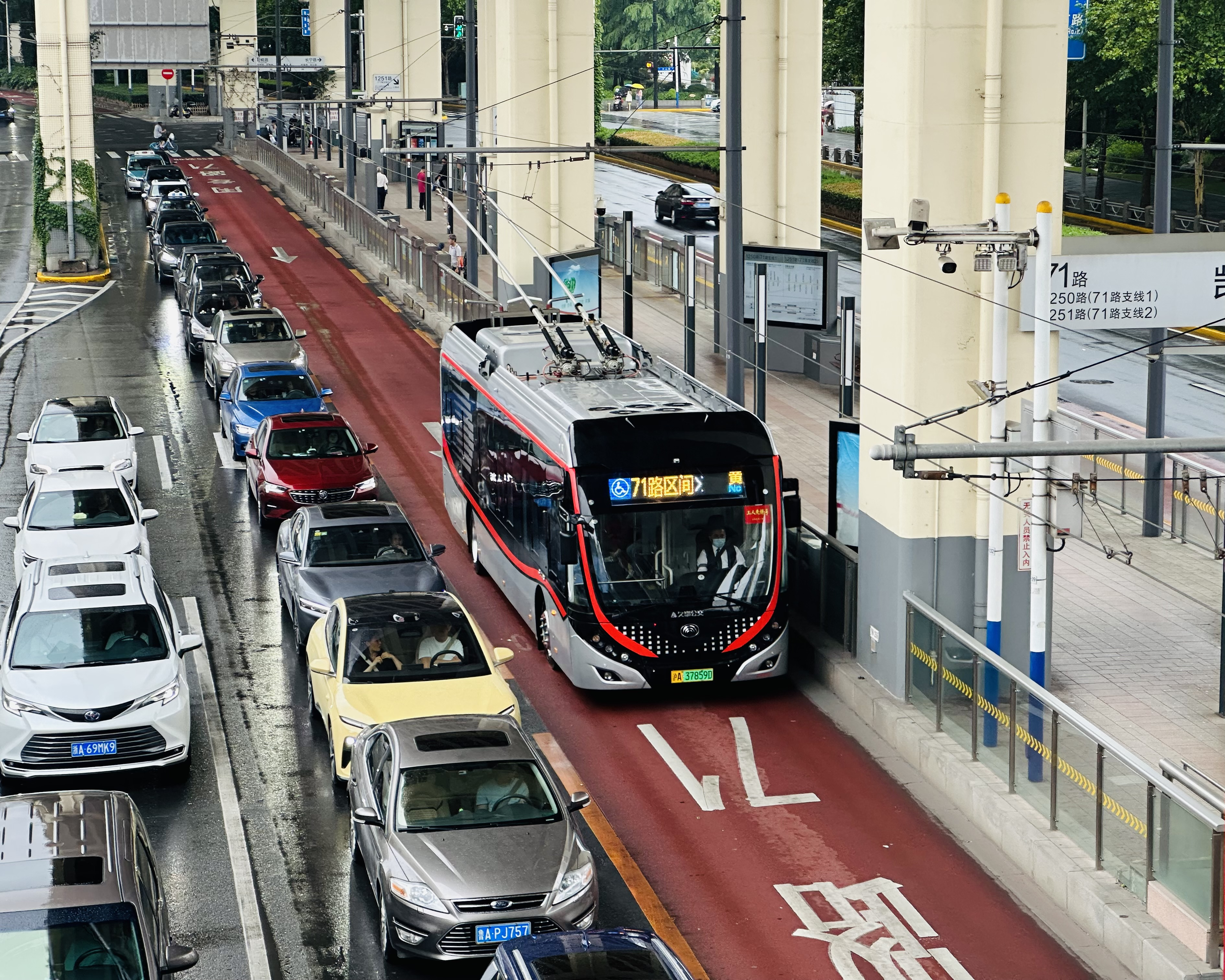
Route 71's dedicated bus lane (in red) allows for bus priority over general traffic congestion.

== Accidents and incidents ==
- On 5 March 2018, a sign on a skyscraper was blown off due to strong winds, hitting a route 71 bus, causing significant damage. No one was injured during the incident.
- On 26 March 2023, a bus operating on the Partial Route 71 crashed into a river near Shenkun Road Bus Terminal. The driver was sent to the hospital unconscious. There were no other passengers on board.
