= Shanghai Public Transport Card =

Contactless fare collection system used in Shanghai

Shanghai public transport card
- Native name

Chinese name
- Simplified Chinese: 上海公共交通卡
- Traditional Chinese: 上海公共交通卡
Transcriptions
Standard Mandarin
- Hanyu Pinyin: Shànghǎi gōnggòng jiāotōng kǎ

Also known as Jiaotong Yikatong
- Simplified Chinese: 交通一卡通
- Traditional Chinese: 交通一卡通
Transcriptions
Standard Mandarin
- Hanyu Pinyin: Jiāotōng yīkǎtōng
- Location: Shanghai
- Launched: 1999
- Technology: ISO 14443
- Manager: Shanghai Public Transportation Card Co., Ltd.
- Currency: RMB (RMB 1,000 maximum load)
- Credit expiry: None
- Auto recharge: Automatic Add Value Service
- Website: Official website

The Shanghai Public Transportation Card (SPTC) (Chinese: 上海公共交通卡; pinyin: Shànghǎi gōnggòng jiāotōng kǎ also known as 交通一卡通; Jiāotōng Yìkǎtōng) is a contactless card, utilising RFID technology, which can be used to access many forms of public transport and related services in and around Shanghai. Shanghai public transportation card is also provided in the form of Apple Pay as well as QR codes, which are accessible through WeChat, Alipay, other transit apps and miniprograms, and enjoy the same price discounts as cards.

== Uses ==
The SPTC is a form of rechargeable cash card, and allows access to, among other things in Shanghai:

- Metros
- Pudong Airport Maglev
- Trams
- Buses and trolleybuses
- Ferries
- Taxis
- Tourist centers
- Car parks
- Fuel stations
- Expressways
- Auto repair service

However, often taxis are driven by a driver other than the registrant of the vehicle and they would turn down the Card.

Among the list above, metro, maglev, trams, buses, trolleybuses and ferries also accept Shanghai Public Transportation QR codes.

Shanghai's latest transportation card (red background with T-Union logo) utilizes China T-Union and can be used in most cities in China that also utilized T-Union. However, foreign T-Union cards will not enjoy most of the discounts.

== Purchase and funding ==
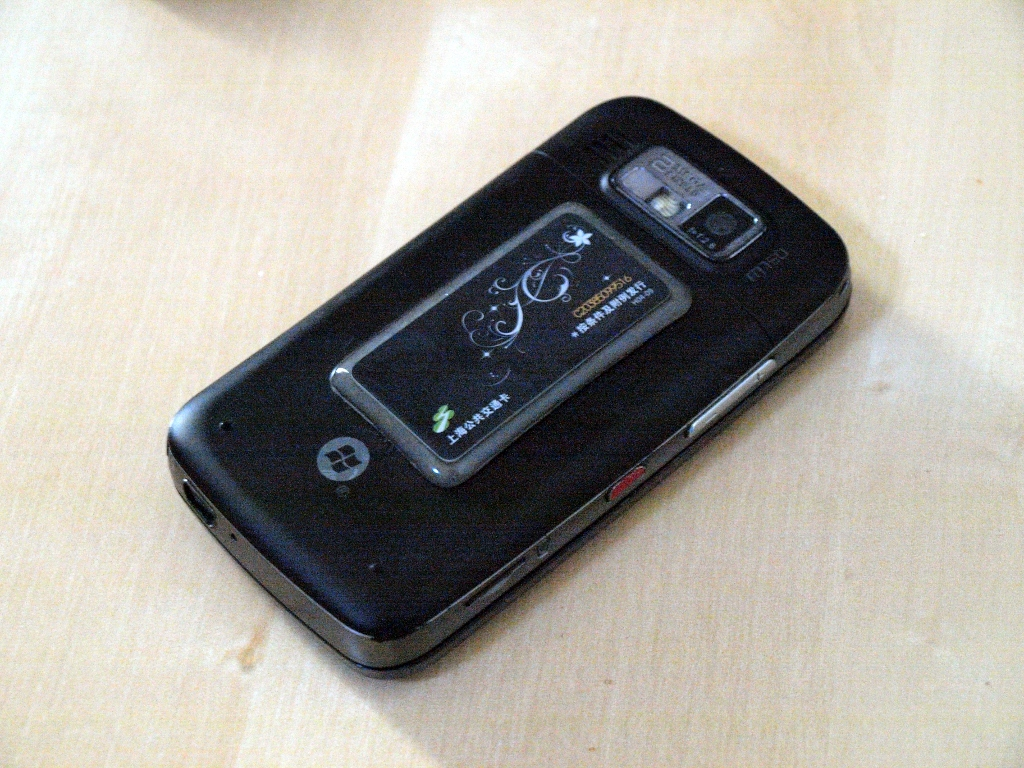
A variant of Shanghai public transportation card: a small sticker that can be attached to anything, e.g. to a phone

There are five types of SPTCs:

- Standard
- Memorial
- Mini
- Personalized
- Watch

Only the Standard card has a refundable deposit (20 RMB); other cards cannot be refunded, but have a lower deposit (20 RMB) and are resalable through other means. Cards can be reloaded in multiples of 10 RMB, at selected convenience stores, banks throughout Shanghai and service counters at all metro stations, or in multiples of 50 RMB in many local Metro stations (by machine; this is only possible for standard-sized cards with the exception of some machines in line 8 stations that are capable of taking most sizes). Furthermore, Android phone users can reload the cards (numbers started with U only) on the SPTC App, using NFC. Should a cardholder attempt to board a bus, ferry or the metro without sufficient funds in their card, an overdraft will be allowed if the balance (prior to the overdraft) is non-negative and the fare is less than 10 RMB.

Personalized cards are also available upon request at the Transportation Card Service Center on West Nanjing Road for a fee of 60 yuan (not inclusive of any credit).

== Discounts ==
The following discounts are available to card holders and QR code users:

=== Interchange discount ===
Cardholders are eligible for a transfer discount discounted by 1 RMB for every transfer within 120 minutes of the first tap-in between buses, metro, and Songjiang Tram, so long as a bus journey is included. The discount applies to buses whose original fare is 1 RMB.

=== Metro Monthly Discount ===
When 70 RMB is used on the same card or QR code account on the Shanghai Metro within one calendar month, further metro fares are discounted 10%. This discount applies after the Interchange discount, i.e. when both discounts are applied to a 4-RMB metro trip, the cost will be 2.7 RMB (The metro fare is 3 RMB after 1 RMB Interchange discount, then 10% discount on 3 RMB is 2.7 RMB).

=== Out-of-Station Transfer ===
Free in-station transfer is unavailable at some stations, such as Shanghai Railway Station. Passengers would require two single-journey tickets or separate scans of QR Code. However, fares paid using physical or digital Shanghai Public Transport Card would be calculated as a single journey provided the transfer is completed within 30 minutes.
