= Timeline of Shanghai Metro =

Evolution of the Shanghai Metro

This article lists the openings of lines, line segments, stations and fare schemes of the Shanghai Metro, a rapid transit system serving Shanghai, China, and one of the fastest-growing metro systems in the world. The first section opened in 1993, and the system currently has 818.63 kilometres (508.67 mi) of track in operation, making it one of the world's largest rapid transit systems by route length and second largest by number of stations.

== Timeline of line openings ==
- May 28, 1993 – Southern section of line 1 (Shanghai South Railway Station – Xujiahui) enters operation (4.37 km or 2.72 mi, 4 stations).
- April 10, 1995 – Two segments on line 1 enter operation (Jinjiang Park – Shanghai South Railway Station (1.63 km or 1.01 mi, 1 station) and Xujiahui – Shanghai Railway Station) (9.71 km or 6.03 mi, 8 stations), extending line 1 at both ends (11.34 km or 7.05 mi, 9 stations). Line 1 operates between Jinjiang Park and Shanghai Railway Station, including the initial section, which opened 1993. Total length: 15.71 km or 9.76 mi, 13 stations.
- December 28, 1996 – Southern extension to line 1 (Xinzhuang – Jinjiang Park) enters operation (4.40 km or 2.73 mi, 3 stations). Total length: 20.11 km or 12.50 mi, 16 stations.
- September 20, 1999 – Line 2 (Zhongshan Park – Longyang Road) enters operation (15.49 km or 9.63 mi, 12 (11 new) stations). Total length: 35.60 km or 22.12 mi, 28 stations (1 interchange; 27 unique).
- December 27, 2000 – An extension and a new line enters operation (27.10 km or 16.84 mi, 20 (17 new) stations):
  - The eastern extension to line 2 (Longyang Road – Zhangjiang Hi-Tech Park) enters operation (2.67 km or 1.66 mi, 1 station);
  - Line 3 (Shanghai South Railway Station – Jiangwan Town) enters operation (24.43 km or 15.18 mi, 19 (16 new) stations).
    Total length: 62.70 km or 38.96 mi, 48 stations (4 interchange; 44 unique).
- November 25, 2003 – Line 5 (Xinzhuang – Minhang Development Zone) enters operation (16.55 km or 10.28 mi, 11 (10 new) stations). Total length: 79.25 km or 49.24 mi, 59 stations (5 interchange; 54 unique).
- December 28, 2004 – Northern extension to line 1 (Shanghai Railway Station – Gongfu Xincun) enters operation (12.42 km or 7.72 mi, 9 stations). Total length: 91.67 km or 56.96 mi, 68 stations (5 interchange; 63 unique).
- December 31, 2005 – Line 4 (Damuqiao Road - Hongqiao Road and Baoshan Road - Lancun Road) enters operation (26.59 km or 16.52 mi, 13 (10 new) stations; an additional 9 stations on share track (Hongqiao Road - Baoshan Road) with line 3), except the section between Lancun Road and Damuqiao Road that was delayed due to a construction accident. Lines 3 and 4 share the same track between Hongqiao Road and Baoshan Road. These nine stations are not counted twice in the total number of stations. Total length: 118.26 km or 73.48 mi, 81 stations (8 interchange; 73 unique).
- December 18, 2006 – Northern extension to line 3 (Jiangwan Town – North Jiangyang Road) enters operation (15.69 km or 9.75 mi, 10 stations). Total length: 133.95 km or 83.23 mi, 91 stations (8 interchange; 83 unique).
- December 30, 2006 – Western extension to line 2 (Songhong Road – Zhongshan Park) enters operation (5.94 km or 3.69 mi, 4 stations). Total length: 139.89 km or 86.92 mi, 95 stations (8 interchange; 87 unique).
- December 29, 2007 – Two extensions and three new lines or sections (South Xizang Road opens as interchange station on lines 4 and 8) enter operation on the same day (93.49 km or 58.09 mi, 66 (61 new) stations):
  - Second northern extension to line 1 (Gongfu Xincun – Fujin Road) enters operations (4.23 km or 2.63 mi, 3 stations);
  - Delayed section of line 4 (Lancun Road – Damuqiao Road), completing the loop, enters operations (7.22 km or 4.49 mi, 4 stations);
  - Line 6 (Gangcheng Road – South Lingyan Road) enters operation (31.00 km or 19.26 mi, 27 (25 new) stations);
  - Line 8 (Shiguang Road – Yaohua Road) enters operation, except China Art Museum station (22.07 km or 13.71 mi, 20 (18 new) stations);
  - Line 9 (Songjiang Xincheng – Guilin Road) enters operations (28.97 km or 18.00 mi, 12 stations).
    Total length: 233.38 km or 145.02 mi, 161 stations (11 interchange; 148 unique).
- December 28, 2008 – Line 9 is extended from Guilin Road to Yishan Road, connecting with the rest of the metro network (1.68 km or 1.04 mi, 1 (0 new) station). Total length: 235.06 km or 146.06 mi, 162 stations (11 interchange; 148 unique).
- July 5, 2009 – Southern extension to line 8 (Yaohua Road – Shendu Highway) enters operation, except Oriental Sports Center station (14.66 km or 9.11 mi, 8 stations). Total length: 249.72 km or 155.17 mi, 170 stations (11 interchange; 156 unique).
- December 5, 2009 – Line 7 (Shanghai University – Huamu Road) enters operation, except Houtan station (31.66 km or 19.67 mi, 26 (19 new) stations). Total length: 281.38 km or 174.84 mi, 196 stations (18 interchange; 175 unique).
- December 31, 2009 – An extension and a new line enters operation (41.63 km or 25.87 mi, 25 (19 new) stations):
  - The downtown section of line 9 (Yishan Road – Century Avenue) enters operations (11.47 km or 7.13 mi, 9 (5 new) stations);
  - First section of line 11 (Jiangsu Road – North Jiading) enters operations, except Chenxiang Highway station (30.16 km or 18.74 mi, 16 (14 new) stations).
    Total length: 323.01 km or 200.71 mi, 221 stations (23 interchange; 194 unique).
- February 24, 2010 – Short section of eastern extension of line 2 (Longyang Road – Guanglan Road) enters operation (3.59 km or 2.23 mi, 2 stations). Zhangjiang Hi-Tech Park station is rebuilt underground. Total length: 326.60 km or 202.94 mi, 223 stations (23 interchange; 196 unique).
- March 16, 2010 – Second western extension to line 2 (East Xujing – Songhong Road) enters operation, except Hongqiao Railway Station station (8.33 km or 5.18 mi, 2 stations), connecting Hongqiao Airport to the metro system. Total length: 334.93 km or 208.12 mi, 225 stations (23 interchange; 198 unique).
- March 29, 2010 – Branch line of line 11 (Jiading Xincheng – Anting) enters operation, except East Changji Road station (12.51 km or 7.77 mi, 3 stations). Total length: 347.44 km or 215.89 mi, 228 stations (23 interchange; 201 unique).
- April 7, 2010 - The section Century Avenue-Middle Yanggao Road opens on line 9 (2.43 km or 1.51 mi, 1 station). Total length: 349.87 km or 217.40 mi, 229 stations (23 interchange; 202 unique).
- April 8, 2010 – Eastern extension to line 2 (Guanglan Road – Pudong International Airport) enters operation (23.69 km or 14.72 mi, 8 stations), connecting the two airports. Total length: 373.56 km or 232.12 mi, 237 stations (23 interchange; 210 unique).
- April 10, 2010 – Line 10 (Xinjiangwancheng – Hangzhong Road) enters operation (29.44 km or 18.29 mi, 27 (21 new) stations). Shanghai Metro becomes the longest metro system in the world after 15 years of breakneck growth. Total length: 403.00 km or 250.41 mi, 264 stations (29 interchange; 231 unique).
- April 20, 2010 – A temporary line and an infill station enters operation (4 km or 2.5 mi, 4 (3 new) stations):
  - Expo section of line 13 (Madang Road – Shibo Avenue) enters temporary operation (4 km or 2.5 mi, 3 (2 new) stations);
  - Houtan station on line 7 opens (1 station).
    Total length: 407.00 km or 252.90 mi, 268 stations (30 interchange; 234 unique).
- July 1, 2010 – with the opening of Hongqiao railway station, its metro station of the same name on line 2 enters operation (1 station). Total length: 407.00 km or 252.90 mi, 269 stations (30 interchange; 235 unique).
- November 2, 2010 – With the end of the Shanghai Expo, the Expo section of line 13 suspends service, to be reopened when the rest of the line is completed (−4 km or −2.5 mi, -3 stations). Total length:403.00 km or 250.41 mi, 266 stations (29 interchange; 233 unique).
- November 30, 2010 – Branch section of line 10 (Longxi Road – Hongqiao Railway Station) enters operation (5.48 km or 3.41 mi, 4 (2 new) stations), connecting the two terminals of Hongqiao Airport. Total length: 408.48 km or 253.82 mi, 270 stations (31 interchange; 235 unique).
- December 28, 2010 – The northern extension to line 7 (Shanghai University – Meilan Lake) enters operation, except Panguang Road, Liuhang and Qihua Road station (11.47 km or 7.13 mi, 3 stations). Total length: 420.22 km or 261.11 mi, 273 stations (31 interchange; 238 unique).
- April 12, 2011 – An interchange station Oriental Sports Center station opens adding an infill station on line 8 and extending line 6 (South Lingyan Road — Oriental Sports Center) extends (1.54 km or 0.96 mi, 1 station).
  Allowing the Shanghai Metro to reach 421.76 km or 262.07 mi, 275 stations (32 interchange; 239 unique).
- April 26, 2011 – Line 11 East Changji Road station opens (1 station). Total length: 421.76 km or 262.07 mi, 276 stations (32 interchange; 240 unique).
- June 30, 2011 – Panguang Road station and Liuhang station on line 7 open (2 stations). Total length: 421.76 km or 262.07 mi, 278 stations (32 interchange; 242 unique).
- September 28, 2012 – China Art Museum station on line 8 opens (1 station). Total length: 421.76 km or 262.07 mi, 279 stations (32 interchange; 243 unique).
- December 30, 2012 – An extension and a new line enters operation (14.26 km or 8.86 mi, 8 (7 new) stations):
  - The southern extension of line 9 (Shanghai Songjiang Railway Station – Songjiang Xincheng) enters operation (5.15 km or 3.20 mi, 3 stations);
  - The first phase of line 13 (Jinyun Road – Jinshajiang Road) enters operation, except South Qilianshan Road station and Daduhe Road station (9.11 km or 5.66 mi, 5 (4 new) stations).
    Total length: 436.02 km or 270.93 mi, 287 stations (33 interchange; 250 unique).
- June 15, 2013 – South Qilianshan Road station on line 13 opens (1 station). Total length: 436.02 km or 270.93 mi, 288 stations (33 interchange; 251 unique).
- August 31, 2013 – The second phase of line 11 (Jiangsu Road – Luoshan Road) enters operation, except Yanyu Road (21.73 km or 13.50 mi, 12 (9 new) stations). Total length: 463.43 km or 287.96 mi, 300 stations (34 interchange; 260 unique).
- October 16, 2013 – The branch extension of line 11 (Anting – Huaqiao) enters operation (5.68 km or 3.53 mi, 3 stations). Shanghai Metro is extended into Jiangsu province, and becomes the first inter-provincial Chinese rapid transit system and second intercity system after the Guangfo Metro. Total length: 469.11 km or 291.49 mi, 303 stations (34 interchange; 263 unique).
- December 29, 2013 – Two new lines enter operation (68.47 km or 42.55 mi, 26 (22 new) stations):
  - The eastern section of line 12 (Tiantong Road – Jinhai Road) enters operation (17.71 km or 11.00 mi, 15 (12 new) stations);
  - Line 16 (Luoshan Road – Dishui Lake) enters operation (50.76 km or 31.54 mi, 11 (10 new) stations).
    Shanghai’s subway network retook the title of longest in the world. Total length: 537.58 km or 334.04 mi, 329 stations (38 interchange; 285 unique).
- May 10, 2014 – Line 12 extension (Jinhai Road - Qufu Road) (1.04 km or 0.65 mi, 1 (0 new) station). Total length: 538.62 km or 334.68 mi, 330 stations (39 interchange; 285 unique).
- July 22, 2014 – Qihua Road station on line 7 opens (1 station). Total length: 538.62 km or 334.68 mi, 331 stations (39 interchange; 286 unique).
- November 1, 2014 – Daduhe Road station on line 13 opens (1 station). Total length: 538.62 km or 334.68 mi, 332 stations (39 interchange; 287 unique).
- December 28, 2014 – Two extensions enter operation (10.18 km or 6.33 mi, 5 (2 new) stations):
  - Extension to line 13 (Jinshajiang Road – Changshou Road) enters operation (3.14 km or 1.95 mi, 3 (1 new) stations);
  - Extension to line 16 (Luoshan Road – Longyang Road) enters operation (7.04 km or 4.37 mi, 2 (1 new) stations).
    Total length: 548.80 km or 341.01 mi, 337 stations (41 interchange; 289 unique).
- December 19, 2015 – Three extensions enter operation (34.62 km or 21.51 mi, 27 (14 new) stations):
  - Extension to line 11 (Luoshan Road – Kangxin Highway) enters operation (4.11 km or 2.55 mi, 2 stations);
  - Extension to line 12 (Qufu Road – Qixin Road) enters operation (20.74 km or 12.89 mi, 16 (7 new) stations);
  - Extension to line 13 (Changshou Road – Shibo Avenue) enters operation (9.78 km or 6.08 mi, 9 (5 new) stations).
    Total length: 583.42 km or 362.52 mi, 364 stations (51 interchange; 303 unique).
- April 26, 2016 – Extension to line 11 (Kangxin Highway - Disney Resort) enters operation (5.08 km or 3.16 mi, 1 station). Total length: 588.50 km or 365.68 mi, 365 stations (51 interchange; 304 unique).
- December 30, 2017 – An extension and a new line enters operation (48.82 km or 30.34 mi, 22 (20 new) stations):
  - The eastern extension of line 9 from Middle Yanggao Road to Caolu enters operations (14.10 km or 8.76 mi, 9 (8 new) stations);
  - Line 17 opens from Hongqiao Railway Station to Oriental Land (34.72 km or 21.57 mi, 13 (12 new) stations).
    Total length: 637.32 km or 396.01 mi, 387 stations (52 interchange; 324 unique).
- March 31, 2018 – Pujiang line (Shendu Highway – Huizhen Road) enters operation (6.60 km or 4.10 mi, 6 (5 new) stations). Total length: 643.92 km or 400.11 mi, 393 stations (53 interchange; 329 unique).
- December 30, 2018 – Two extensions enters operation (32.42 km or 20.14 mi, 20 (16 new) stations):
  - Extension to line 5 (Dongchuan Road – Fengxian Xincheng) enters operation (16.18 km or 10.05 mi, 8 stations);
  - Extension to line 13 (Shibo Avenue – Zhangjiang Road) enters operation (16.24 km or 10.09 mi, 12 (8 new) stations).
    Total length: 676.34 km or 420.26 mi, 413 stations (57 interchange; 345 unique).
- August 25, 2020 – Chenxiang Highway station on line 11 opens (1 station). Total length: 676.34 km or 420.26 mi, 414 stations (57 interchange; 346 unique).
- December 26, 2020 – An extension and a new line enters operation (25.07 km or 15.58 mi, 14 (12 new) stations):
  - Extension to line 10 (Guofan Road – Jilong Road) (10.02 km or 6.23 mi, 6 (5 new) stations);
  - Line 18 (Yuqiao – Hangtou) opens (15.05 km or 9.35 mi, 8 (7 new) stations).
    Total length: 701.41 km or 435.84 mi, 428 stations (59 interchange; 358 unique).
- January 23, 2021 – Line 15 (Gucun Park - Zizhu Hi-tech Park) enters operation, except Guilin Road station (41.22 km or 25.61 mi, 29 (23 new) stations). Shanghai retook the title of longest metro system in the world. Total length: 742.63 km or 461.45 mi, 457 stations (64 interchange; 381 unique).
- June 27, 2021 – Guilin Road station on line 15 opens (1 (0 new) station), making the station an interchange station with line 9 . Total length: 742.63 km or 461.45 mi, 458 stations (65 interchange; 381 unique).
- December 30, 2021 – An extension and a new line (Changyi Road opens as interchange station on lines 14 and 18) enters operation (59.63 km or 37.05 mi, 48 (27 new) stations):
  - Line 14 (Fengbang – Guiqiao Road) except Longju Road station opens (38.18 km or 23.72 mi, 30 (18 new) stations);
  - Extension to line 18 (Yuqiao – South Changjiang Road) (21.45 km or 13.33 mi, 18 (10 new) stations).
    Total length: 802.26 km or 498.50 mi, 506 stations (83 interchange; 408 unique).
- September 21, 2024 – Station names were combined as one.
  Total length: 802.26 km or 498.50 mi, 506 stations (85 interchange; 406 unique).
  - Line 2 and line 14 South Pudong Road station becomes an interchange station.
  - Line 2 and line 17 National Exhibition and Convention Center station becomes an interchange station.
- September 28, 2024 – Line 11 Kangheng Road station opens (1 station).
  Total length: 802.26 km or 498.50 mi, 507 stations (85 interchange; 407 unique).
- November 30, 2024 – Extension to line 17 (Oriental Land – Xicen) (6.6 km or 4.1 mi, 1 (1 new) stations).
  Total length: 808.86 km or 502.60 mi, 508 stations (85 interchange; 408 unique).
- November 1, 2025 – An extension of line 2 from National Exhibition and Convention Center to Panxiang Road · Shanghai National Accounting Institute entered operation. New station Panxiang Road · Shanghai National Accounting Institute opens. (1.67 km or 1.04 mi, 1 (1 new) stations). Total length: 810.53 km or 503.64 mi, 509 stations (85 interchange; 409 unique).
- December 27, 2025 – Section of line 18 opened from South Changjiang Road to Kangwen Road (South Jiangyang Road not opened until 2027). Hulan Road becomes interchange station. (8.1 km or 5.0 mi, 5 (4 new) stations). Total length: 818.63 km or 508.67 mi, 513 stations (86 interchange; 413 unique).

| Date | Line | Segment | Length (km) | Stations | | Cumulative Network length (km) | Network stations | | |
| Date | Line | Segment | Length (km) | Total | New | Cumulative Network length (km) | Total | Unique | Inter- change |
|---|---|---|---|---|---|---|---|---|---|
| 28 May 1993 | 1 | 1) Shanghai South Railway Station – Xujiahui | 4.37 | 4 | 4 | 4.37 | 4 | 4 | 0 |
| 10 Apr 1994 | | 2) Extension: 1 (two segments; extending at both ends) | 11.34 | 9 | 9 | 15.71 | 13 | 13 | 0 |
| 10 Apr 1994 | 1 | 2a) Jinjiang Park – Shanghai South Railway Station | 1.63 | 1 | 1 | 15.71 | 13 | 13 | 0 |
| 10 Apr 1994 | 1 | 2b) Xujiahui – Shanghai Railway Station | 9.71 | 8 | 8 | 15.71 | 13 | 13 | 0 |
| 28 Dec 1996 | 1 | 3) Xinzhuang – Jinjiang Park | 4.40 | 3 | 3 | 20.11 | 16 | 16 | 0 |
| 20 Sep 1999 | 2 | 4) Zhongshan Park – Longyang Road | 15.49 | 12 | 11 | 35.60 | 28 | 27 | 1 |
| 27 Dec 2000 | | 5) New line: 3 Extension: 2 | 27.10 | 20 | 17 | 62.70 | 48 | 44 | 4 |
| 27 Dec 2000 | 2 | 5a) Longyang Road – Zhangjiang Hi-Tech Park | 2.67 | 1 | 1 | 62.70 | 48 | 44 | 4 |
| 27 Dec 2000 | 3 | 5b) Shanghai South Railway Station – Jiangwan Town | 21.43 | 19 | 16 | 62.70 | 48 | 44 | 4 |
| 25 Nov 2003 | 5 | 6) Xinzhuang – Minhang Development Zone | 16.55 | 11 | 10 | 79.25 | 59 | 54 | 5 |
| 28 Dec 2004 | 1 | 7) Shanghai Railway Station – Gongfu Xincun | 12.42 | 9 | 9 | 91.67 | 68 | 63 | 5 |
| 31 Dec 2005 | 4 | 8) Damuqiao Road - Hongqiao Road (Track sharing with line 3: Hongqiao Road - Baoshan Road); Baoshan Road - Lancun Road | 26.59 | 13 (Note: Lines 3 and 4 share the same track between Hongqiao Road and Baoshan Road. These nine stations are not counted twice in the total number of stations.) | 10 | 118.26 | 81 | 73 | 8 |
| 18 Dec 2006 | 3 | 9) Jiangwan Town – North Jiangyang Road | 15.67 | 10 | 10 | 133.95 | 91 | 83 | 8 |
| 30 Dec 2006 | 2 | 10) Songhong Road – Zhongshan Park | 5.94 | 4 | 4 | 139.89 | 95 | 87 | 8 |
| 29 Dec 2007 | | 11) New line: 6 8 9 Extension: 1 4 | 93.49 | 66 | 61 (Note: South Xizang Road opens as interchange station on lines 4 and 8.) | 233.38 | 161 | 148 | 11 |
| 29 Dec 2007 | 1 | 11a) Gongfu Xincun – Fujin Road | 4.23 | 3 | 3 | 233.38 | 161 | 148 | 11 |
| 29 Dec 2007 | 4 | 11b) Lancun Road – Damuqiao Road | 7.22 | 4 | 4 | 233.38 | 161 | 148 | 11 |
| 29 Dec 2007 | 6 | 11c) Gangcheng Road – South Lingyan Road | 31.00 | 27 | 25 | 233.38 | 161 | 148 | 11 |
| 29 Dec 2007 | 8 | 11d) Shiguang Road – Yaohua Road (Note: Except China Art Museum station which opened 29-09-2012.) | 22.07 | 20 | 18 | 233.38 | 161 | 148 | 11 |
| 29 Dec 2007 | 9 | 11e) Songjiang Xincheng – Guilin Road | 28.97 | 12 | 12 | 233.38 | 161 | 148 | 11 |
| 28 Dec 2008 | 9 | 12) Guilin Road - Yishan Road | 1.68 | 1 | 0 | 235.06 | 162 | 148 | 11 |
| 5 Jul 2009 | 8 | 13) Yaohua Road – Shendu Highway (Note: Except Oriental Sports Center station which opened 12-04-2011.) | 14.66 | 8 | 8 | 249.72 | 170 | 156 | 11 |
| 5 Dec 2009 | 7 | 14) Shanghai University – Huamu Road (Note: Except Houtan station which opened 20-04-2010.) | 31.66 | 26 | 19 | 281.38 | 196 | 175 | 18 |
| 31 Dec 2009 | | 15) New line: 11 Extension: 9 | 41.63 | 25 | 19 | 323.01 | 221 | 194 | 23 |
| 31 Dec 2009 | 9 | 15a) Yishan Road – Century Avenue | 11.47 | 9 | 5 | 323.01 | 221 | 194 | 23 |
| 31 Dec 2009 | 11 | 15b) Jiangsu Road – North Jiading (Note: Except Chenxiang Highway station which opened 25-08-2020.) | 30.16 | 16 | 14 | 323.01 | 221 | 194 | 23 |
| 24 Feb 2010 | 2 | 16) Longyang Road – Guanglan Road (Note: Zhangjiang Hi-Tech Park station is rebuilt underground.) | 3.59 | 2 | 2 | 326.60 | 223 | 196 | 23 |
| 16 Mar 2010 | 2 | 17) East Xujing – Songhong Road (Note: Except Hongqiao Railway Station station which opened at the same time of the opening of Hongqiao railway station on 01-07-2010. Hongqiao Airport is connected to the metro system.) | 8.33 | 2 | 2 | 334.93 | 225 | 198 | 23 |
| 29 Mar 2010 | 11 | 18) Jiading Xincheng – Anting | 12.51 | 3 | 3 | 347.44 | 228 | 201 | 23 |
| 7 Apr 2010 | 9 | 19) Century Avenue-Middle Yanggao Road | 2.43 | 1 | 1 | 349.87 | 229 | 202 | 23 |
| 8 Apr 2010 | 2 | 20) Guanglan Road – Pudong International Airport (Note: Pudong Airport is connected to the metro system and it is connected to Hongqiao Airport by metro.) | 23.69 | 8 | 8 | 373.56 | 237 | 210 | 23 |
| 10 Apr 2010 | 10 | 21) Xinjiangwancheng – Hangzhong Road | 29.44 | 27 | 21 | 403.00 (Note: Shanghai Metro becomes the longest metro system in the world after 15 years of breakneck growth.) | 264 | 231 | 29 |
| 20 Apr 2010 | | 22) New line: 13 Infill station: 7 | 4 | 4 | 3 | 407.00 | 268 | 234 | 30 |
| 20 Apr 2010 | 7 | 22a) Houtan station | 0 | 1 | 1 | 407.00 | 268 | 234 | 30 |
| 20 Apr 2010 | 13 | 22b) Madang Road – Shibo Avenue | 4 | 4 | 3 | 407.00 | 268 | 234 | 30 |
| 1 Jul 2010 | 2 | 23) Hongqiao railway station | 0 | 1 | 1 | 407.00 | 269 | 235 | 29 |
| 2 Nov 2010 | 13 | 24) Madang Road – Shibo Avenue (suspension) | -4 | -4 | -3 | 403.00 | 266 | 233 | 29 |
| 30 Dec 2010 | 10 | 25) Longxi Road – Hongqiao Railway Station | 5.48 | 4 | 2 | 408.48 | 270 | 235 | 31 |
| 28 Dec 2010 | 7 | 26) Shanghai University – Meilan Lake (Note: Except Panguang Road station which opened 30-06-2011, Liuhang station which opened 30-06-2011 and Qihua Road station which opened 22-07-2014.) | 11.47 | 3 | 3 | 420.22 | 273 | 238 | 31 |
| 12 Apr 2011 | | 27) Extension: 6 Infill station: 8 | 1.54 | 1 | 1 | 421.76 | 275 | 239 | 32 |
| 12 Apr 2011 | 8 | 27a) Oriental Sports Center station | 0 | 1 | 1 | 421.76 | 275 | 239 | 32 |
| 12 Apr 2011 | 6 | 27b) South Lingyan Road — Oriental Sports Center | 1.54 | 1 | 1 | 421.76 | 275 | 239 | 32 |
| 26 Apr 2011 | 11 | 28) East Changji Road station | 0 | 1 | 1 | 421.76 | 276 | 240 | 32 |
| 30 Jun 2011 | 7 | 29) Panguang Road station and Liuhang station | 0 | 2 | 2 | 421.76 | 278 | 242 | 32 |
| 28 Sep 2012 | 8 | 30) China Art Museum station | 0 | 1 | 1 | 421.76 | 279 | 243 | 32 |
| 30 Dec 2012 | | 31) New line: 13 Extension: 9 | 14.26 | 8 | 7 | 436.02 | 287 | 250 | 33 |
| 30 Dec 2012 | 9 | 31a) Shanghai Songjiang Railway Station – Songjiang Xincheng | 5.15 | 3 | 3 | 436.02 | 287 | 250 | 33 |
| 30 Dec 2012 | 13 | 31b) Jinyun Road – Jinshajiang Road (Note: Except South Qilianshan Road station which opened 15-06-2013 and Daduhe Road station which opened 01-11-2014.) | 9.11 | 5 | 4 | 436.02 | 287 | 250 | 33 |
| 15 Jun 2013 | 13 | 32) South Qilianshan Road station | 0 | 1 | 1 | 436.02 | 288 | 251 | 33 |
| 31 Aug 2013 | 11 | 33) Jiangsu Road – Luoshan Road (Note: Except Kangheng Road station which opened 28-09-2024.) | 21.73 | 12 | 9 | 463.43 | 300 | 260 | 34 |
| 16 Oct 2013 | 11 | 34) Anting – Huaqiao (Note: Shanghai Metro is extended into Jiangsu province, and becomes the first inter-provincial Chinese rapid transit system and second intercity system after the Guangfo Metro.) | 5.68 | 3 | 3 | 469.11 | 303 | 263 | 34 |
| 29 Dec 2013 | | 35) New line: 12 16 | 68.47 | 26 | 22 | 537.58 (Note: Shanghai’s subway network retook the title of longest in the world.) | 329 | 285 | 38 |
| 29 Dec 2013 | 12 | 35a) Tiantong Road – Jinhai Road | 17.71 | 15 | 12 | 537.58 | 329 | 285 | 38 |
| 29 Dec 2013 | 16 | 35b) Luoshan Road – Dishui Lake | 50.76 | 11 | 10 | 537.58 | 329 | 285 | 38 |
| 10 May 2014 | 12 | 36) Jinhai Road - Qufu Road | 1.04 | 1 | 0 | 538.62 | 330 | 285 | 39 |
| 22 Jul 2014 | 7 | 37) Qihua Road station | 0 | 1 | 1 | 538.62 | 331 | 286 | 39 |
| 1 Nov 2014 | 13 | 38) Daduhe Road station | 0 | 1 | 1 | 538.62 | 332 | 287 | 39 |
| 28 Dec 2014 | | 39) Extension: 13 16 | 10.18 | 5 | 2 | 548.80 | 337 | 289 | 41 |
| 28 Dec 2014 | 13 | 39a) Jinshajiang Road – Changshou Road | 3.14 | 3 | 1 | 548.80 | 337 | 289 | 41 |
| 28 Dec 2014 | 16 | 39b) Luoshan Road – Longyang Road | 7.04 | 2 | 1 | 548.80 | 337 | 289 | 41 |
| 19 Dec 2015 | | 40) Extension: 11 12 13 | 34.62 | 27 | 14 | 583.42 | 364 | 303 | 51 |
| 19 Dec 2015 | 11 | 40a) Luoshan Road – Kangxin Highway | 4.11 | 2 | 2 | 583.42 | 364 | 303 | 51 |
| 19 Dec 2015 | 12 | 40b) Qufu Road – Qixin Road | 20.74 | 16 | 7 | 583.42 | 364 | 303 | 51 |
| 19 Dec 2015 | 13 | 40c) Changshou Road – Shibo Avenue | 9.78 | 9 | 5 | 583.42 | 364 | 303 | 51 |
| 26 Apr 2016 | 11 | 41) Kangxin Highway - Disney Resort | 5.08 | 1 | 1 | 588.50 | 365 | 304 | 51 |
| 30 Dec 2017 | | 42) New line: 17 Extension: 9 | 48.82 | 22 | 20 | 637.32 | 387 | 324 | 52 |
| 30 Dec 2017 | 9 | 42a) Middle Yanggao Road - Caolu | 14.10 | 9 | 8 | 637.32 | 387 | 324 | 52 |
| 30 Dec 2017 | 17 | 42b) Hongqiao Railway Station - Oriental Land | 34.72 | 13 | 12 | 637.32 | 387 | 324 | 52 |
| 31 Mar 2018 | Pujiang | 43) Shendu Highway – Huizhen Road | 6.60 | 6 | 5 | 643.92 | 393 | 329 | 53 |
| 30 Dec 2018 | | 44) Extension: 5 13 | 32.42 | 20 | 16 | 676.34 | 413 | 345 | 57 |
| 30 Dec 2018 | 5 | 44a) Dongchuan Road – Fengxian Xincheng | 16.18 | 8 | 8 | 676.34 | 413 | 345 | 57 |
| 30 Dec 2018 | 13 | 44b) Shibo Avenue – Zhangjiang Road | 16.24 | 12 | 8 | 676.34 | 413 | 345 | 57 |
| 25 Aug 2020 | 11 | 45) Chenxiang Highway station | 0 | 1 | 1 | 676.34 | 414 | 346 | 57 |
| 26 Dec 2020 | | 46) New line: 18 Extension: 10 | 25.07 | 14 | 12 | 701.41 | 428 | 358 | 59 |
| 26 Dec 2020 | 10 | 46a) Guofan Road – Jilong Road | 10.02 | 6 | 5 | 701.41 | 428 | 358 | 59 |
| 26 Dec 2020 | 18 | 46b) Yuqiao – Hangtou | 15.05 | 8 | 7 | 701.41 | 428 | 358 | 59 |
| 23 Jan 2021 | 15 | 47) Gucun Park - Zizhu Hi-tech Park (Note: Except Guilin Road station which opened 27-06-2021.) | 41.22 | 29 | 23 | 742.63 | 457 | 381 | 64 |
| 27 Jun 2021 | 15 | 48) Guilin Road station | 0 | 1 | 0 | 742.63 | 458 | 381 | 65 |
| 30 Dec 2021 | | 49) New line: 14 Extension: 18 | 59.63 | 48 | 27 (Note: Changyi Road opens as interchange station on lines 14 and 18.) | 802.26 | 506 | 408 | 83 |
| 30 Dec 2021 | 14 | 49a) Fengbang – Guiqiao Road (Note: Except Longju Road station which is still unopened.) | 38.18 | 30 | 18 | 802.26 | 506 | 408 | 83 |
| 30 Dec 2021 | 18 | 49b) Yuqiao – South Changjiang Road | 21.45 | 18 | 10 | 802.26 | 506 | 408 | 83 |
| 21 Sep 2024 | | 50) Station names were combined as one | 0 | 0 | 0 | 802.26 | 506 | 406 | 85 |
| 21 Sep 2024 | 2 14 | 50a) South Pudong Road | 0 | 0 | | 802.26 | 506 | 406 | 85 |
| 21 Sep 2024 | 2 17 | 50b) National Exhibition and Convention Center | 0 | 0 | | 802.26 | 506 | 406 | 85 |
| 28 Sep 2024 | 11 | 51) Kangheng Road | 0 | 1 | 1 | 802.26 | 507 | 407 | 85 |
| 30 Nov 2024 | 17 | 52) Oriental Land – Xicen | 6.60 | 1 | | 808.86 | 508 | 408 | 85 |
| 1 Nov 2025 | 2 | 53) National Exhibition and Convention Center - Panxiang Road · Shanghai National Accounting Institute | 1.67 | 1 | 1 | 810.53 | 509 | 409 | 85 |
| 27 Dec 2025 | 18 | 54) South Changjiang Road – Kangwen Road (Note: South Jiangyang Road not opened until 2027.) | 8.1 | 5 | 4 | 818.63 | 513 | 413 | 86 |

== Name change of Shanghai metro lines ==
In the Master Plan of Shanghai Metro-Region 1999–2020 the name of subway lines was subdivided in three categories:

- R: Regional route (connecting the suburbs to the city center)
- M: Municipal route (connecting to the central city)
- L: Light rail (less passenger capacity than the subway, as a supplement to the subway)

On 14 January 2003 it was announced that the naming of rail transit lines will be unified to Rail Transit Line 1, Line 2, and Line N.

Changes of line name in the Shanghai metro system
| 1999–2020 Master plan name | Current name | Notes |
|---|---|---|
| R1 | 1 | |
| R1a | 5 | Formerly part of south extension of line 1. Initially referred to as Xinmin line (Chinese: 莘闵线) or Xinmin light rail (Chinese: 莘闵轻轨). |
| R2 | 2 | Initially referred to as Changning line (长宁线). |
| R2w | 17 | Formerly part of west extension of line 2. Between 2010 and 2012 designated as line 20. Also referred to as Qingpu line (青浦线; 青浦線). |
| R3 | 11 | Initially referred to as Shenjia line (申嘉线). |
| R3s | 16 | Formerly part of south extension of line 11. Between 29 January and 1 March 2010 designated as line 21. Also referred to as Lingang line (临港线). Nickname: Excursion line (as it connects several scenic spots). |
| R4 | 9 | Initially referred to as Shensong line (申松线). |
| R4n | Chongming | Formerly part of north extension of line 9. Up to 2016 the planned name was line 19. |
| M1 | 10 | Nickname: Golden line (as it links many of the city's tourist attractions). |
| M2 | 12 | Initially referred to as Minpu line. |
| M3 | 3 | Up to 8 Aug 2002 named Pearl (or Mingzhu) line (明珠线). Due to the publicity of some media in the early years and some existing misidentifications (such as "Light Rail Line 3" in Shanghai South Railway Station), Shanghai citizens are used to calling it the light rail as it is an elevated line. |
| M4 | 4 | Initially referred to as Pearl line phase II (明珠线二期). Also referred to as Loop line (环线). |
| M5 | 13 | During 2010 (as part of EXPO2010) the segment (three stations) which opened was referred to as Expo line. |
| M6 | 14 | |
| M7 | 7 | |
| M8 | 8 | Initially referred to as Yangpu line (杨浦线). |
| M8s | Pujiang | Formerly part of south extension (phase 3) of line 8. |
| L1 | 15 | |
| L2 | | Up to 2011 the planned name was line 16. |
| L3 | Jiamin | Up to 2011 the planned name was line 17. |
| L4 | 6 | Initially referred to as Pudong line (浦东线) or Pudong light rail (浦东轻轨). Nickname: Hello Kitty line (due to its lurid pink livery). |
| L5 | 18 | |

== Timeline of Shanghai Metro fare scheme ==
=== Trial openings sightseeing fare scheme ===
- April 1993 line 1 (Xinlonghua - Xujiahui) trial operation for sightseeing to the public: fare 5 yuan.
- December 1994 line 1 (Xujiahui - Shanghai Railway Station) trial operation for sightseeing to the public: fare 4 yuan.
- September 1999 line 2 trial operation for sightseeing to the public: fare 5 yuan. In 2000 the second ticket was free (buy one, get one free).

=== Line specific fares ===
- Line 1:
  - At the official opening in April 1995, the approved fare scheme was 2, 4, and 6 yuan, but a discounted fare scheme of 1, 2, and 3 yuan was implemented. The plan was to return to the approved fare scheme at end of the year.
  - December 1995: Instead of returning to the approved fare scheme, due to extensive public pressure, a single fare of 2 yuan was implemented (length of line 1 was 15.71 kilometers/13 stations at the time).
  - At the opening of the southern extension in December 1996, this section (Xinzhuang – Jinjiang Paradise) operated independently with a fare of 1 yuan.
  - On July 1, 1997 (as through operations at Jinjiang Paradise were established) the line introduced a two-level segment fares of 2 yuan (13 stops or less) and 3 yuan (14 stops or more).
  - On March 1, 1999, the fare increased with 1 yuan (i.e. 3 yuan (13 stops or less) and 4 yuan (14 stops or more)). Shanghai Metro line 1 opened an automatic ticket collection system (using an American system), using one-way tickets (magnetic cards) and stored-value tickets (IC cards), and the original paper tickets were discontinued.
  - In August 2000 the fare scheme of line 1 was changed to the unified fare scheme.
- Line 2:
  - At the official opening in May 2000 the fare of line 2 is 2 yuan for 0 to 6 kilometers; 3 yuan for 6 to 16 kilometers; more than 16 kilometers, the fare increases by 1 yuan for every additional 6 kilometers. From opening line 2 used magnetic card one-way ticket, and the magnetic card stored-value ticket and the contactless smart card stored-value ticket which can be used on metro lines 1 and 2.
  - In August 2000 the fare scheme of line 2 was changed to the unified fare scheme.
  - To ease the traffic pressure in the tunnel, line 2 launched a special price of 1 yuan for crossing the river (within 3 stops) between August 10, 2000, and November 1, 2001, and then the number of passengers increased exponentially.
- Line 3:
  - From opening in December 2000 preferential fares were implemented, with 2 yuan for the ride below 9 stops, and 3 yuan for the ride with more than 10 stops.
  - From November 1, 2003, the unified fare scheme was implemented. Paper tickets on line 3 were discontinued. The ticket collection system used the Indra system from Spain, which was incompatible with the ticket system of lines 1 and 2. Therefore, passengers still had to exit the station at Zhongshan Park to transfer between lines 2 and 3.
- Line 5:
  - From opening in 2003 a reduced fare is 2 yuan for journeys under 6 km and all other journeys on the line were 3 yuan (though the total length of this section is a bit longer than 16 km), originally implemented to cultivate passenger flow.
  - In December 2005 paper tickets were discontinued. The unified fare scheme was implemented for rides not exclusively on line 5 (rides exclusively on line 5 kept their reduced fare).
  - Until December 26, 2020, there remained for journeys exclusively on the 1st phase of line 5 (Xinzhuang – Minhang Development Zone) a reduced fare is 2 yuan for journeys under 6 km and all other journeys on the line were 3 yuan. This was not applied once passengers interchange to other lines, e.g. fare for passengers from Xinzhuang to Chunshen Road was 2 Yuan, while fare for passengers from Waihuanlu to Chunshen Road was 3 Yuan.
- During the Expo 2010 in Shanghai riding on the expo line (currently line 13) was free. A valid Expo ticket was needed to ride the line.
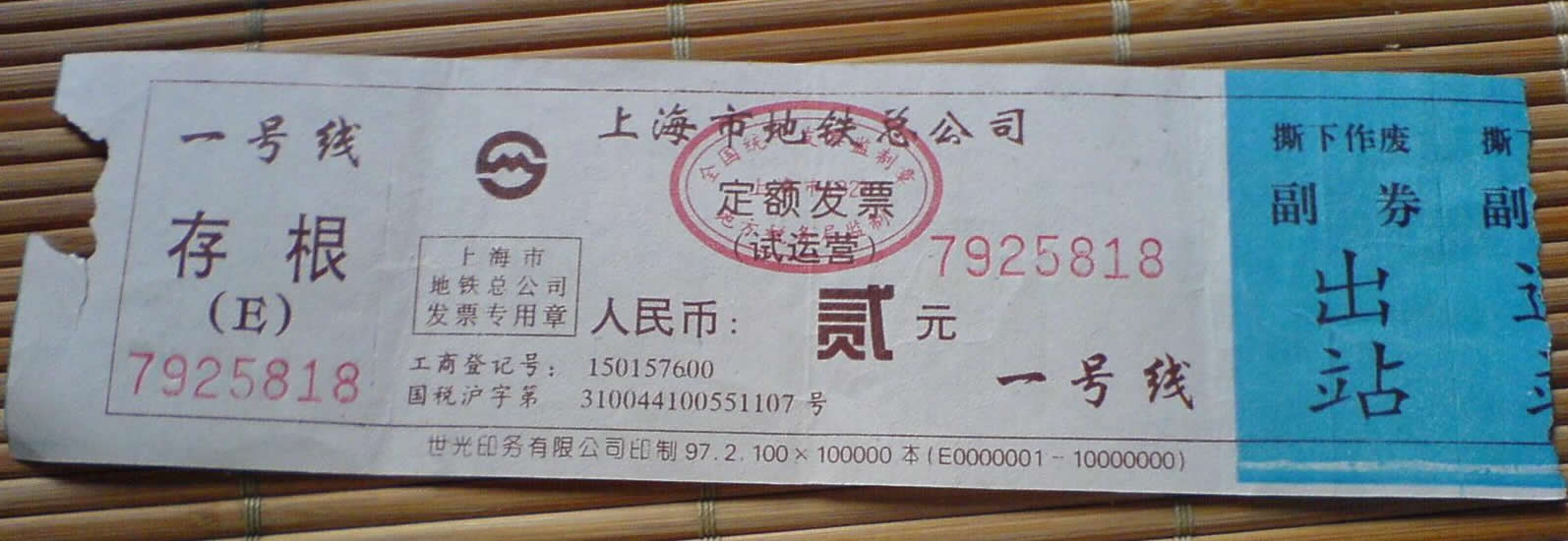
Line 1 ticket used in 1995-1997.

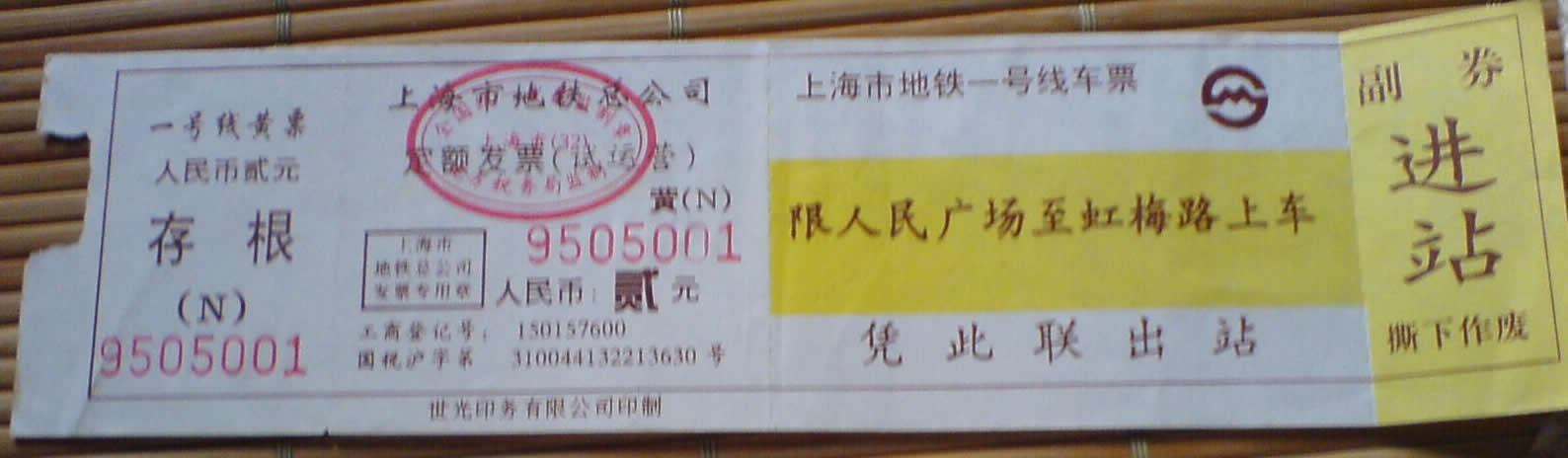
Line 1 ticket used in 1997-March 1, 1999.

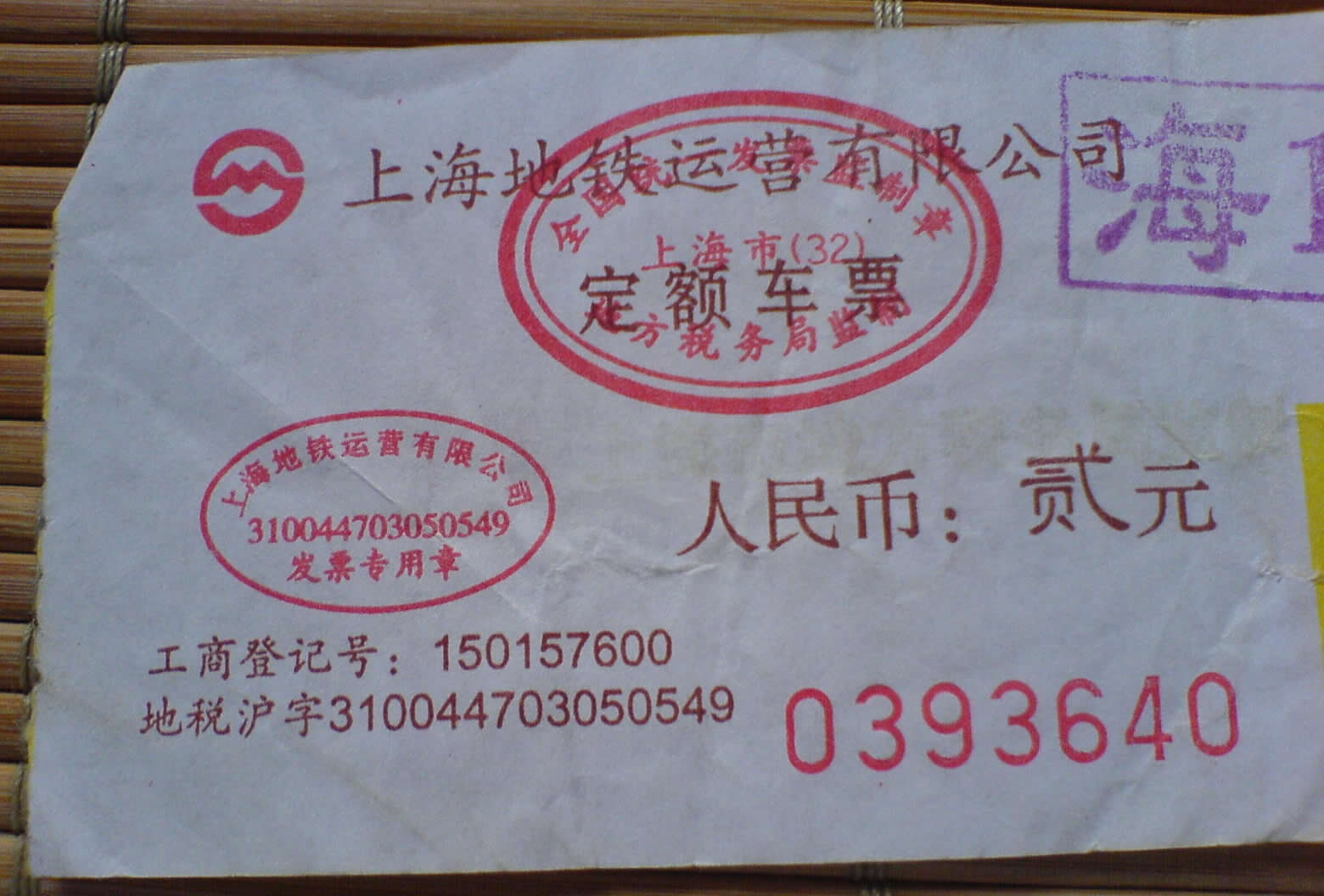
Line 3 ticket used before 2003.

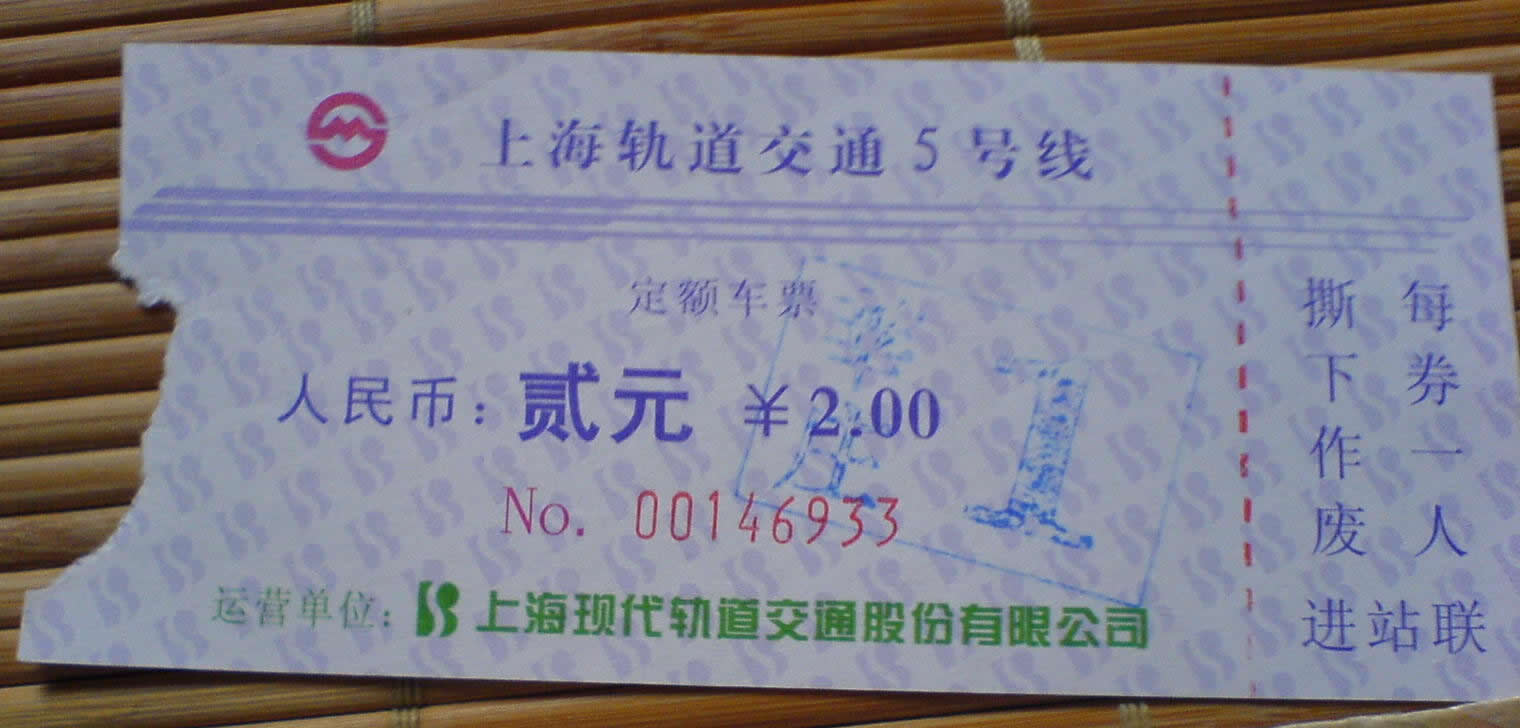
Line 5 ticket used before 2005.

=== Unified fare scheme ===
- From August 2000 passengers can change between lines 1 and 2 at People's Square without exiting the station. A unified fare scheme was introduced for lines 1 and 2 with a fare of 2 yuan within 6 kilometers, 3 yuan for 6-16 kilometers, and 1 yuan for every additional 6 kilometers (e.g. 4 yuan for more than 16 kilometers). For journeys exclusively from Xinzhuang Station to People's Square Station, the fare is calculated as if it is less than 16 kilometers, though the distance between People's Square Station and Xinzhuang Station is about 17.8 km (11.1 mi).
- In 2003 line 3 implemented the unified fare scheme (though in station interchange to other lines was not yet established).
- On September 15, 2005, the shortest rides increased their fare by 1 yuan from 2 yuan to 3 yuan. This was to relieve the overcrowded metro network (with a daily ridership of 1.3 million people in 2004). After 16 kilometers the fare increases with 1 yuan for every 10 kilometers instead of every 6 kilometers. Therefore, rides longer than 28 kilometers had their prices either remained the same or dropped by 1 or 2 yuan. These price changes were meant to encourage more people to take the bus, particularly during rush hour as about 30% of rush-hour passengers and 38% of the total passengers use the subways for short trips. However, the metro fare increase seems to have had little effect.
- On October 21, 2005, Shanghai Metro lines 1 and 2 fully launched the new "One-Ticket Pass" ticket card.
- In November 2005 the cumulative discount scheme was introduced: a discount scheme of 10% after 70 yuan was introduced to benefit long-distance passengers.
- On December 25, 2005, Shanghai Metro realized a "one-ticket transfer" across the entire Shanghai Metro between lines 1, 2, 3, and 5 and avoids the problem of inability to continuously count the journeys due to the second ticket purchase. Shanghai Metro has become the first enterprise in China to realize the network operation of the automatic fare collection system. Passengers do not have to exit the station at Zhongshan Park to transfer between lines 2 and 3 and do not have to exit Xinzhuang to transfer between lines 1 and 5. Note: virtual interchange between lines 1 and 3 at Shanghai Railway Station was only implemented on June 1, 2008. New line openings from 2005 adopted the unified fare scheme.
- In October 2007 the combined ride discount was introduced: when transferring between air-conditioned bus and Shanghai metro travelers can enjoy 1 yuan discount.
- 1 Jun 2008 virtually interchange station implemented, first three virtually interchange stations were: Hongkou Football Stadium, Shanghai Railway Station, and Yishan Road.
- In April 2009 the combined ride discount was extended to include all bus rides (also non air-conditioned bus rides). The transfer time is extended to 2 hours.
- On 24 April 2010 a one-day pass priced at 18 yuan was introduced for the Expo 2010 held in Shanghai (continued to be offered after Expo 2010).
- On 8 March 2012 a three-day pass priced at 45 yuan was introduced.
- On 26 June 2016 after the implementation of the comprehensive pension system for the elderly, the free transportation for seniors over 70 were abolished. On 1 July 2016 an insurance transportation card, referred to as "Baotong Card" (保通卡) was launched by commercial insurer Pacific Insurance Company for senior Shanghainese with household registration to take free all-day free rides.
