= Songfa Road station =

Shanghai Metro station

Songfa Road 淞发路
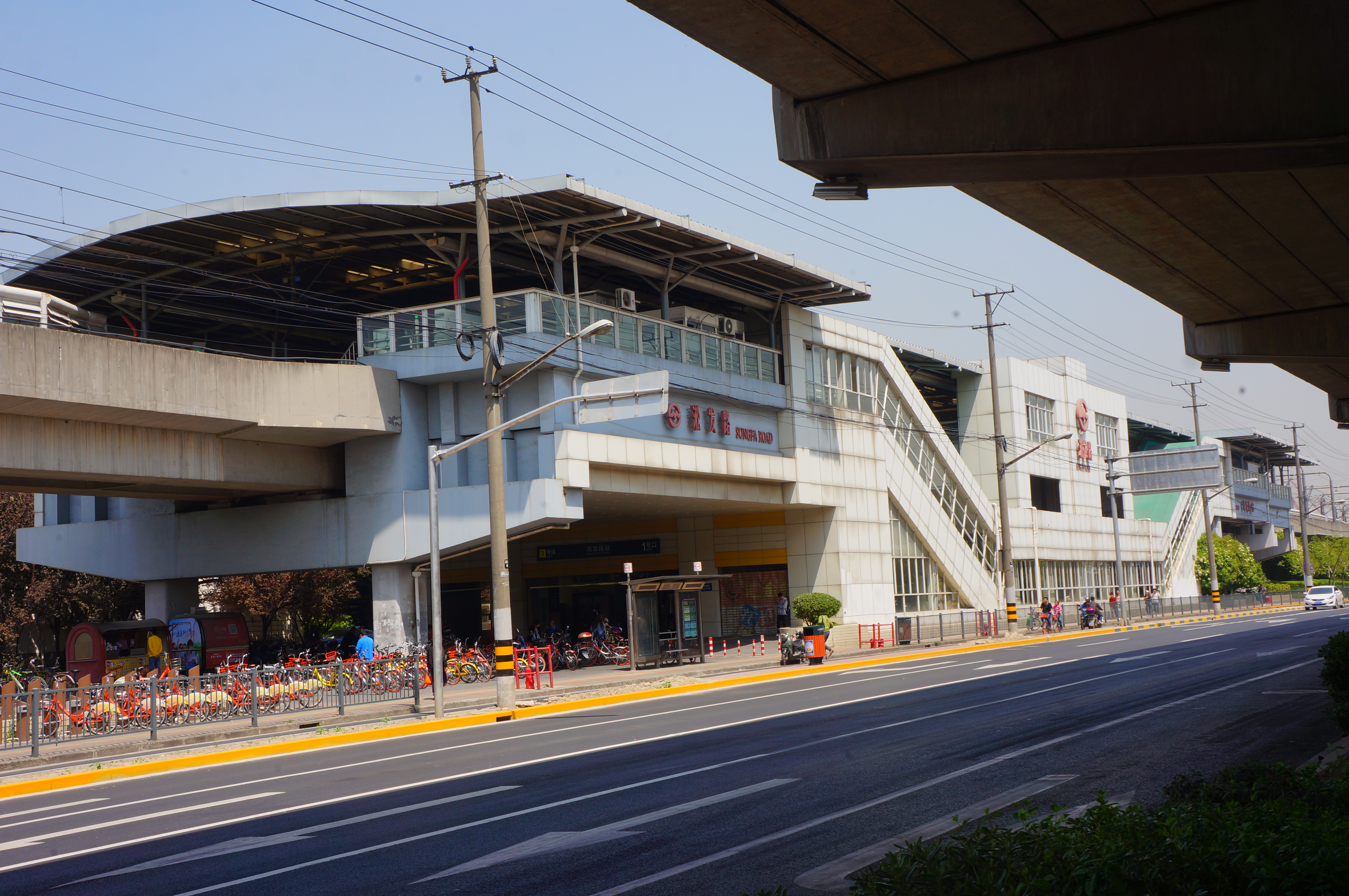

General information
- Location: Yixian Road (逸仙路) and Songfa Road; Songnan, Baoshan District, Shanghai; China
- Coordinates: 31.344438°N 121.500249°E
- Operator: Shanghai No. 3 Metro Operation Co. Ltd.
- Line: Line 3
- Platforms: 2 (2 side platforms)
- Tracks: 2

Construction
- Structure type: Elevated
- Accessible: Yes

History
- Opened: 18 December 2006; 19 years ago

Services
Preceding station	Shanghai Metro	Following station
Zhanghuabang towards North Jiangyang Road	Line 3	South Changjiang Road towards Shanghai South Railway Station
Location
- Location within Shanghai

Songfa Road (simplified Chinese: 淞发路; traditional Chinese: 淞發路; pinyin: Sōngfā Lù) is a station on the Shanghai Metro Line 3. It is part of the northern extension of that line from Jiangwan Town to North Jiangyang Road that opened on 18 December 2006.
