= Shuangjiang Road station =

Shanghai Metro station

Shuangjiang Road 双江路
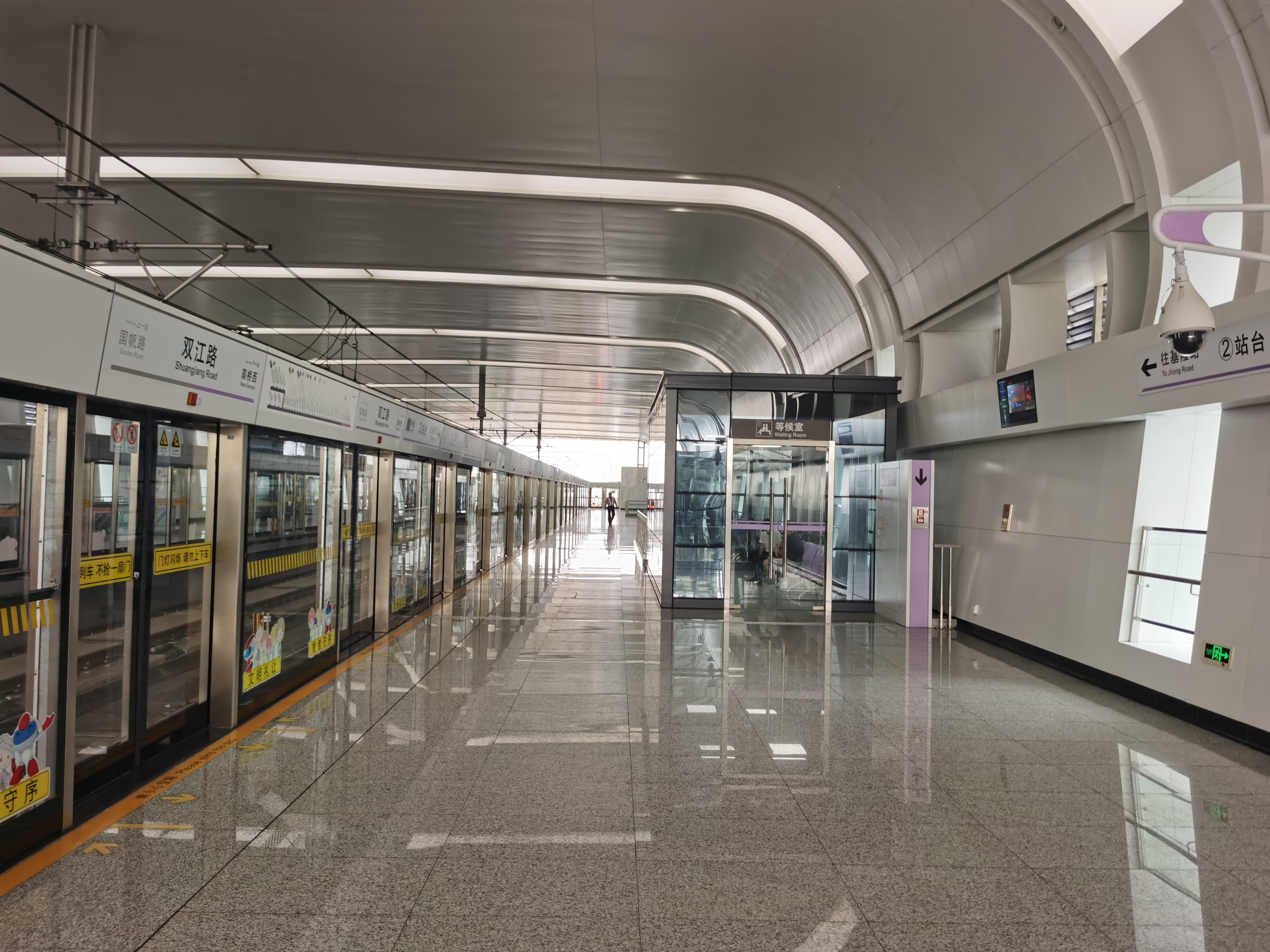
- Platform towards Jilong Road

General information
- Location: Shuangjiang Road and Gangcheng Road; Pudong, Shanghai; China
- Coordinates: 31.355636°N 121.535229°E
- Operated by: Shanghai No. 1 Metro Operation Co. Ltd.
- Line: Line 10
- Platforms: 2 (2 side platforms)
- Tracks: 2

Construction
- Structure type: Elevated
- Accessible: Yes

Other information
- Station code: L10/30

History
- Opened: 26 December 2020

Services
| Preceding station | Shanghai Metro | Following station |
|---|---|---|
| Guofan Road towards Hongqiao Railway Station or Hangzhong Road | Line 10 | West Gaoqiao towards Jilong Road |
Location

Shuangjiang Road (Chinese: 双江路; pinyin: Shuāngjiāng Lù) is a Shanghai Metro station located on Line 10 in Pudong, Shanghai. Located at the intersection of Shuangjiang Road and Gangcheng Road, it was expected to open with the rest of the northern extension of Line 10 in 2018, however, due to construction delays, it opened on 26 December 2020.

== Description ==
The station is in the northern part of Pudong, at the intersection of Gangcheng Road and Shuangjiang Road. It is one of five stations on Line 10 in Pudong, and the first station to be located in the district heading toward Jilong Road station. It is an elevated structure consisting of 2 side platforms.
