= Shanghai Automobile City station =

Shanghai Metro station

Shanghai Automobile City 上海汽车城
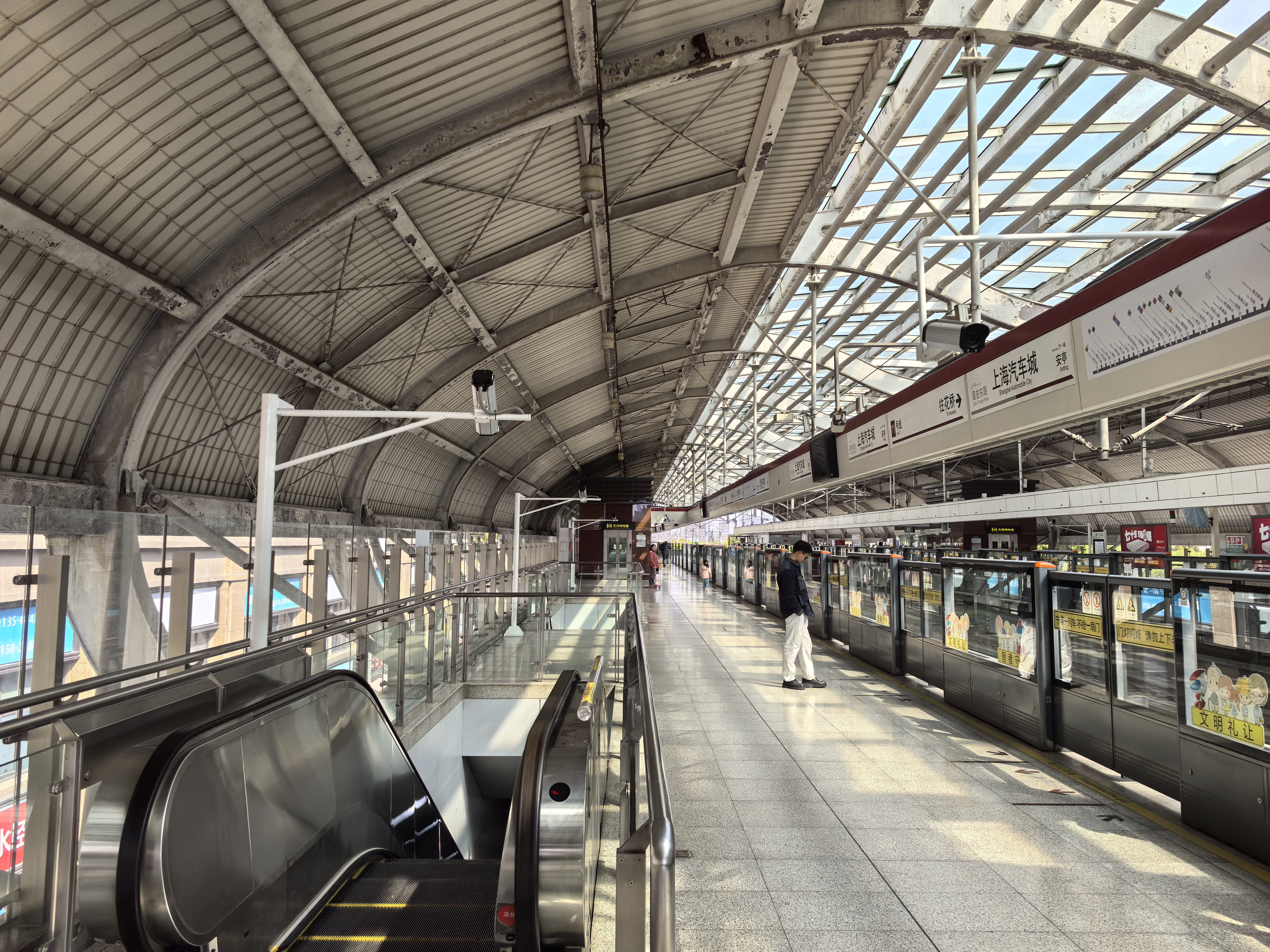
- Station platform

General information
- Location: Jiading District, Shanghai; China
- Coordinates: 31°17′14″N 121°10′34″E
- Operator: Shanghai No. 2 Metro Operation Co. Ltd.
- Line: Line 11
- Platforms: 2 (2 side platforms)
- Tracks: 2

Construction
- Structure type: Elevated
- Accessible: Yes

History
- Opened: 29 March 2010

Services
| Preceding station | Shanghai Metro | Following station |
|---|---|---|
| Anting towards Huaqiao | Line 11 branch | East Changji Road towards Disney Resort |
Location
- Location within Shanghai

Shanghai Automobile City (simplified Chinese: 上海汽车城; traditional Chinese: 上海汽車城; pinyin: Shànghǎi Qìchēchéng) is a station on the branch line of Line 11 of the Shanghai Metro. It opened on 29 March 2010.
