= Xiuyan Road station =

Shanghai Metro station

Xiuyan Road 秀沿路
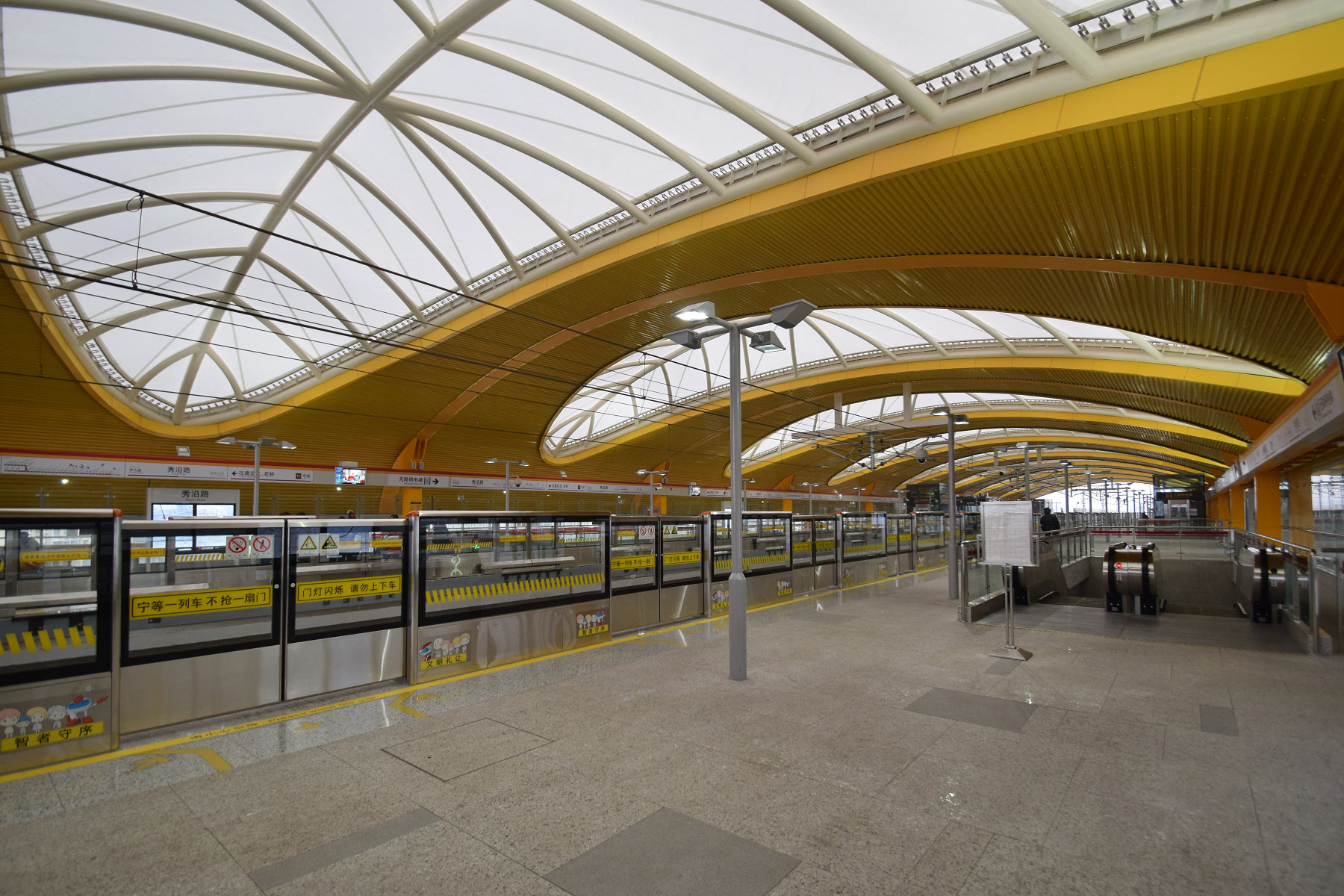
- Station platform, Disney Resort-bound side

General information
- Other names: East Kangqiao Road (former)
- Location: Kangqiao, Pudong, Shanghai; China
- Coordinates: 31°08′25″N 121°35′39″E
- Operator: Shanghai No. 2 Metro Operation Co. Ltd.
- Line: Line 11
- Platforms: 2 (2 side platforms)
- Tracks: 2

Construction
- Structure type: Elevated
- Accessible: Yes

History
- Opened: December 19, 2015

Services
Preceding station	Shanghai Metro	Following station
Luoshan Road towards North Jiading or Huaqiao	Line 11	Kangxin Highway towards Disney Resort
Location
- Location within Shanghai

Xiuyan Road (Chinese: 秀沿路; pinyin: Xiùyán Lù) is a station on Line 11 of the Shanghai Metro. It opened on December 19, 2015. This station was formerly known as East Kangqiao Road (simplified Chinese: 康桥东路; traditional Chinese: 康橋東路; pinyin: Kāngqiáo Dōng Lù). Xiuyan Road Station is filled will abundant natural light from the station’s high-ceiling skylights. The station also has amenities, such as a platform waiting room, and three exits to Xiuyan Road.

Line 16 passes nearby, but does not stop here.

The station started construction during the first phase of the Line 11 Disney extension, in May 2013, during the same time the Shanghai Disney station started construction (Disney Extension Phase II). During the first few years of major work, the station was referred to as East Kangqiao Road. In September 2014, the civil construction was substantially complete, with work finishing on connecting the two phases of the Disney extension. It was until November 19, 2015, when this station and Phase 1 opened to the public.
