= West Yingao Road station =

Shanghai Metro station

West Yingao Road 殷高西路
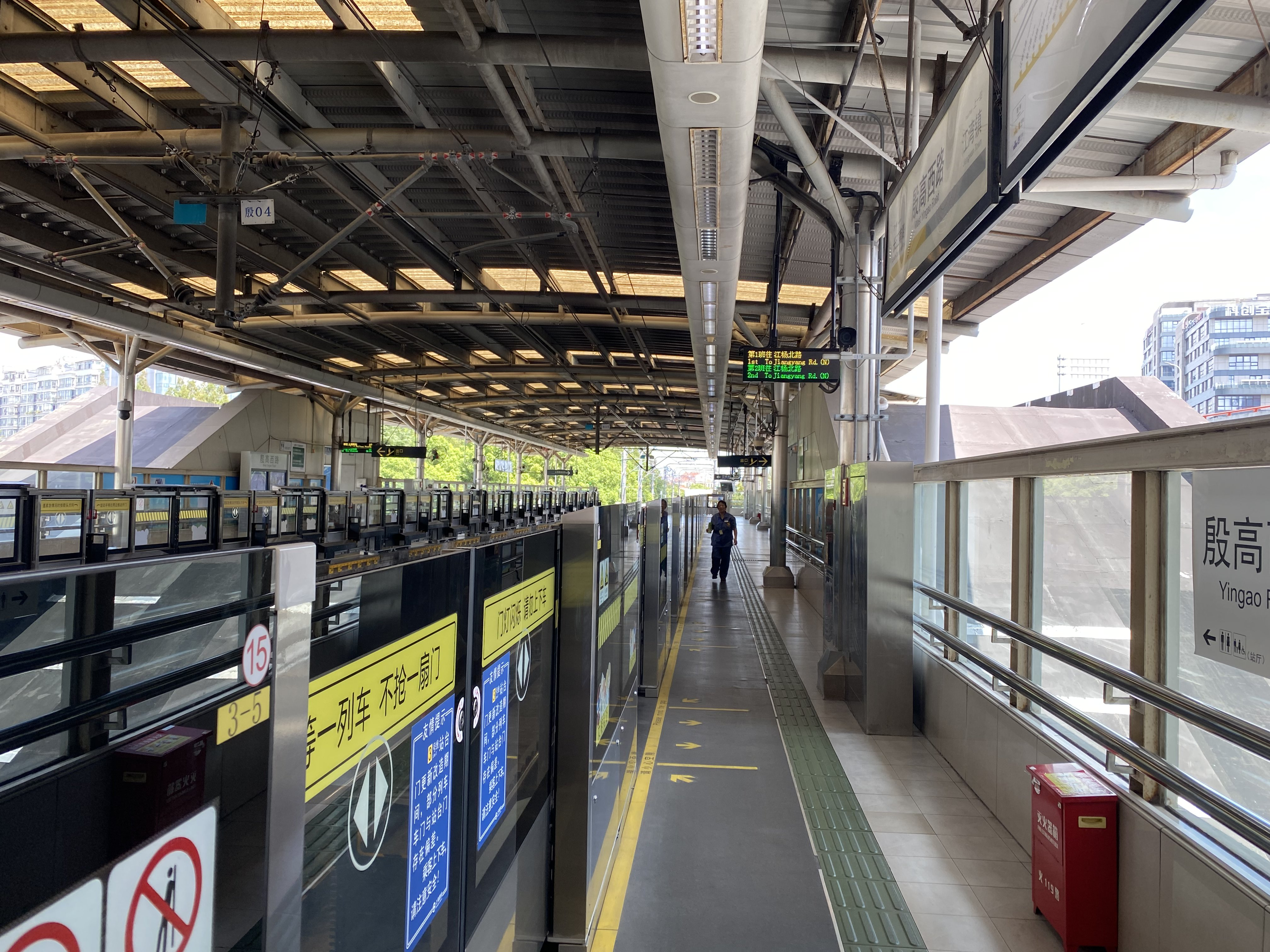
- Station platform

General information
- Location: Yixian Road (逸仙路) and West Yingao Road; Gaojing, Baoshan District, Shanghai; China
- Coordinates: 31°19′12″N 121°29′05″E
- Operator: Shanghai No. 3 Metro Operation Co. Ltd.
- Line: Line 3
- Platforms: 2 (2 side platforms)
- Tracks: 2

Construction
- Structure type: Elevated
- Accessible: Yes

History
- Opened: 18 December 2006; 19 years ago

Services
| Preceding station | Shanghai Metro | Following station |
|---|---|---|
| South Changjiang Road towards North Jiangyang Road | Line 3 | Jiangwan Town towards Shanghai South Railway Station |
Location
- Location within Shanghai

West Yingao Road (Chinese: 殷高西路; pinyin: Yīngāo Xī Lù) is a station on Shanghai Metro Line 3, which is located in Gaojing Town, Baoshan District. It is part of the northern extension of that line from Jiangwan Town to North Jiangyang Road that opened on 18 December 2006.

== Station Layout ==
| G | Entrances and Exits, Concourse | Exits 1-2, Faregates, Station Agent |
| 2F | Side Platform, doors open on the right |
| 2F | Southbound | ← Line 3 towards Shanghai South Railway Station (Jiangwan Town) |
| 2F | Northbound | Line 3 towards North Jiangyang Road (South Changjiang Road) → |
| 2F | Side Platform, doors open on the right |
