= Yingao Road station =

Shanghai metro station

Yingao Road 殷高路
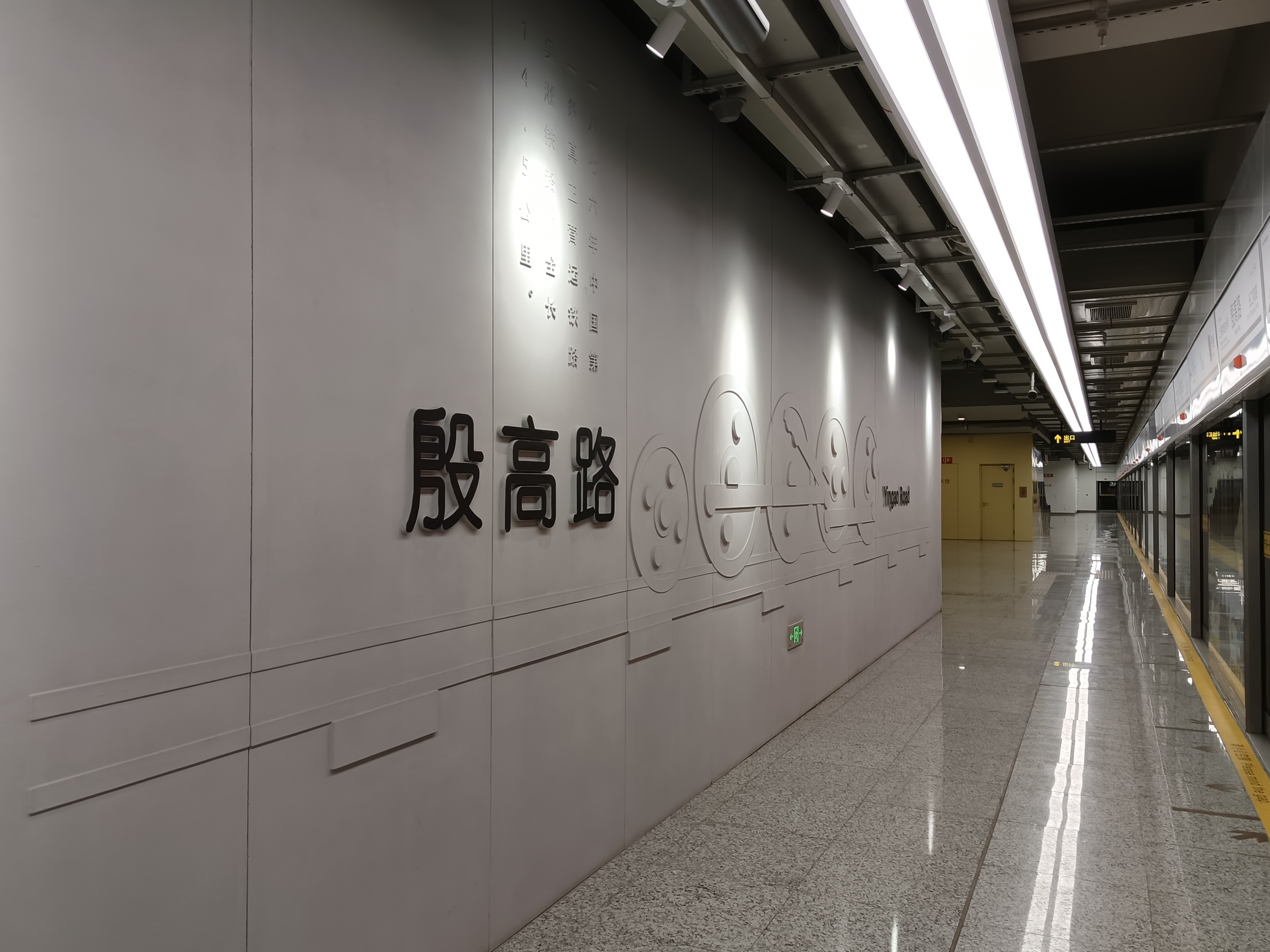
- Platform

General information
- Other names: North Guoquan Road
- Location: Yingao Road and North Guoquan Road; Baoshan District and Yangpu District boundary, Shanghai; China
- Coordinates: 31.32255°N 121.491°E
- Line: Line 18
- Platforms: 2 (1 island platform)
- Tracks: 2

Construction
- Structure type: Underground
- Accessible: Yes

History
- Opened: 30 December 2021

Services
Preceding station	Shanghai Metro	Following station
South Changjiang Road towards Kangwen Road	Line 18	Shanghai University of Finance and Economics towards Hangtou
Location

Yingao Road (Chinese: 殷高路; pinyin: Yīngāo Lù) is a metro station on Line 18 of the Shanghai Metro. Located at the intersection of Yingao Road and North Guoquan Road along the boundary of Baoshan District with Yangpu District in the city of Shanghai, the station was opened with the rest of phase one of Line 18 on December 30, 2021. During the planning stage of Line 18, the station was known as North Guoquan Road (simplified Chinese: 国权北路; traditional Chinese: 國權北路; pinyin: Guóquán Běilù).
