= Guofan Road station =

Shanghai Metro station

Guofan Road 国帆路
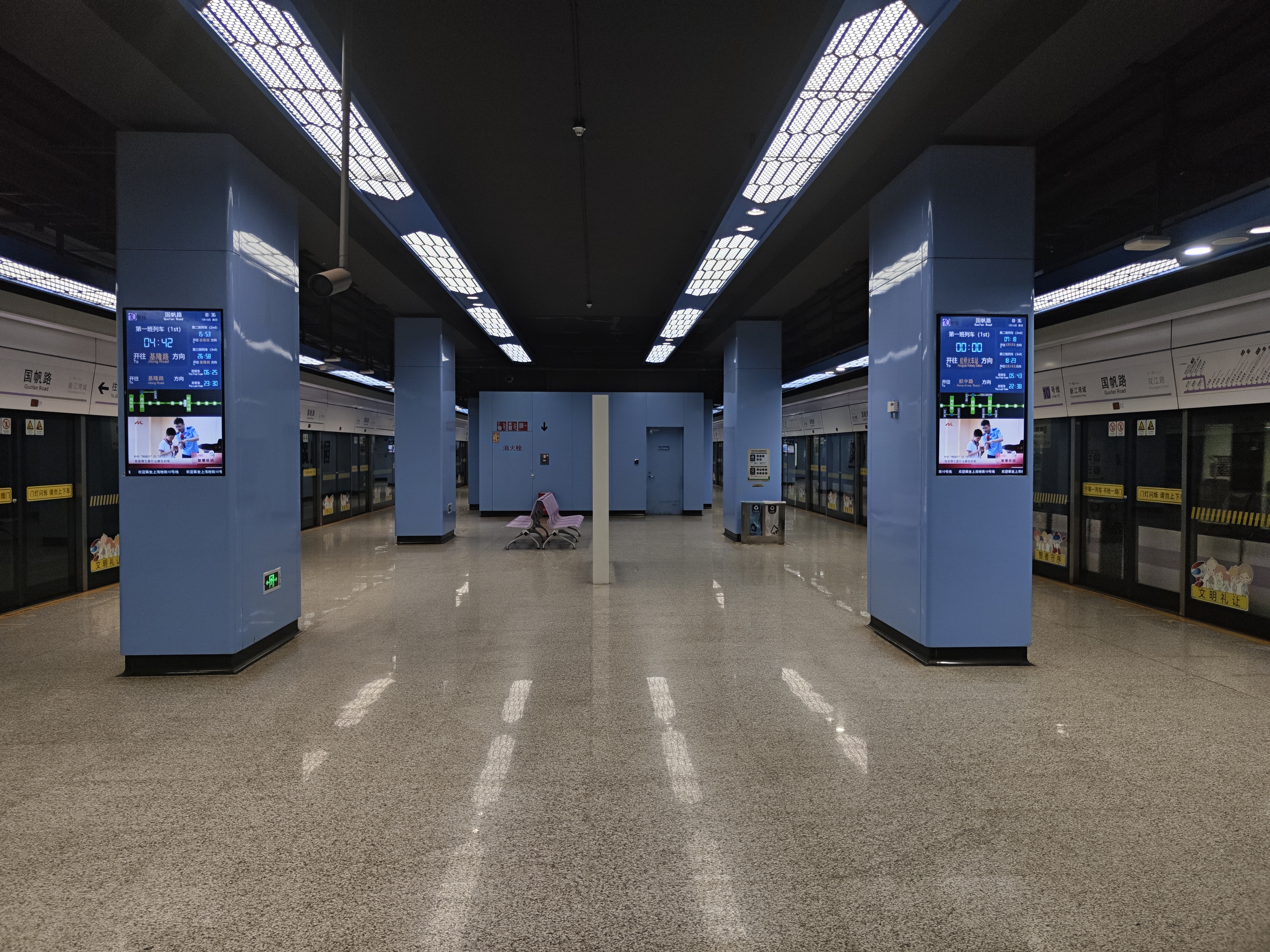
- Station platform

General information
- Location: Guofan Road and Songhu Road; Yangpu District, Shanghai; China
- Coordinates: 31.3416°N 121.5088°E
- Operated by: Shanghai No. 1 Metro Operation Co. Ltd.
- Line: Line 10
- Platforms: 2 (1 island platform)
- Tracks: 2

Construction
- Structure type: Underground
- Accessible: Yes

Other information
- Station code: L10/29

History
- Opened: 26 December 2020

Services
Preceding station	Shanghai Metro	Following station
Xinjiangwancheng towards Hongqiao Railway Station or Hangzhong Road	Line 10	Shuangjiang Road towards Jilong Road
Location

Guofan Road (simplified Chinese: 国帆路; traditional Chinese: 國帆路; pinyin: Guófān Lù) is a Shanghai Metro station located on Line 10 in Yangpu District, Shanghai. The station is located on Songhu Road at Guofan Road, between Xinjiangwancheng and Shuangjiang Road stations. Heading northbound, this will be the last station on the metro line on the Puxi side of the Huangpu River. It was expected to open with the rest of the phase two northern extension of Line 10 in 2018, however, due to construction delays, it opened on 26 December 2020. It will be an underground station with an island platform.

== Description ==
The station is located at the intersection of Songhu Road and Guofan Road in the New Jiangwan City neighbourhood of Shanghai, within the city's Yangpu District. It is located close to the Jiangwan campus of Fudan University. Due to its proximity to precision instruments located at the university's laboratories, the station was built at a deeper level underground in order to reduce the impact of vibrations from the train tunnels. Another feature of this station unique to the Shanghai Metro network, and also intended to reduce the effect of vibrations, is the use of separated walls in its construction. The theme of the station is one of simplicity, with wind pipes and utility wires hidden inside light fixtures. There are also public art installations inside the station, including a sculpture shaped like an egg and carved with zeros and ones, to indicate Line 10 being the first driverless train line in the city, and as a wordplay with the nearby Fudan University (dan can also mean egg in Chinese).
