= Kangheng Road station =

Metro station in Shanghai, China

Kangheng Road 康恒路
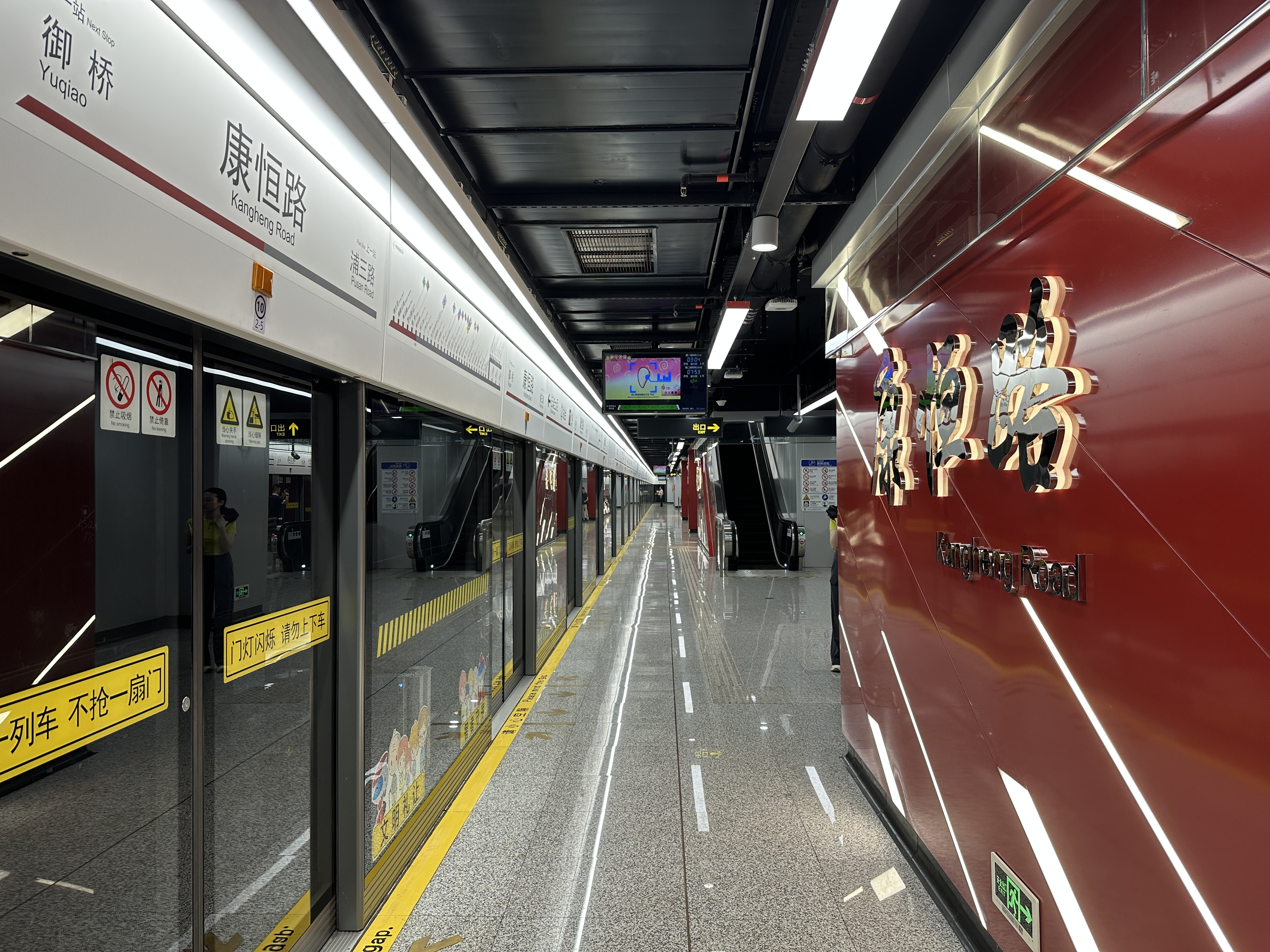
- Station platform

Chinese name
- Simplified Chinese: 康恒路站
- Traditional Chinese: 康恒路站 / 康恆路站
Transcriptions
Standard Mandarin
- Hanyu Pinyin: Kānghénglù Zhàn

General information
- Location: Yuqiao Road (御桥路) and Kangheng Road (康恒路); Beicai, Pudong New Area, Shanghai; China
- Coordinates: 31°09′24″N 121°32′59″E
- System: Shanghai Metro
- Operator: Shanghai No. 2 Metro Operation Co. Ltd.
- Line: Line 11
- Platforms: 2 (1 island platform)
- Tracks: 2

Construction
- Structure type: Underground
- Accessible: Yes

History
- Opened: 28 September 2024

Services
Preceding station	Shanghai Metro	Following station
Pusan Road towards North Jiading or Huaqiao	Line 11	Yuqiao towards Disney Resort
Location
- Location within Shanghai

Kangheng Road (Chinese: 康恒路) (planning name Yanyu Road (Chinese: 严御路)) is a station on Line 11 of the Shanghai Metro in Shanghai, China, located between Yuqiao and Pusan Road stations. Although it is part of the second phase of Line 11, it did not open with the other stations on August 31, 2013. Instead, it was left as a reserved station under construction pending development in the area. The station opened on 28 September 2024.

== Station layout ==
Kangheng Road has two levels: a concourse, and an island platform for Line 11.

=== Entrances/exits ===
- Exit 1: Yuqiao Road, Kangheng Road
- Exit 2: Yuqiao Road, Kangheng Road
- Exit 3: Yuqiao Road, Kangheng Road
- Exit 4: Yuqiao Road, Kangyi Road (康意路)
- Passage A: Yuqiao 96 Plaza Yu Center (九六御桥御中心)
- Passage B: Yu Bay (智慧湾)
- Passage C: Yu Hill (智慧岭)

== Gallery ==
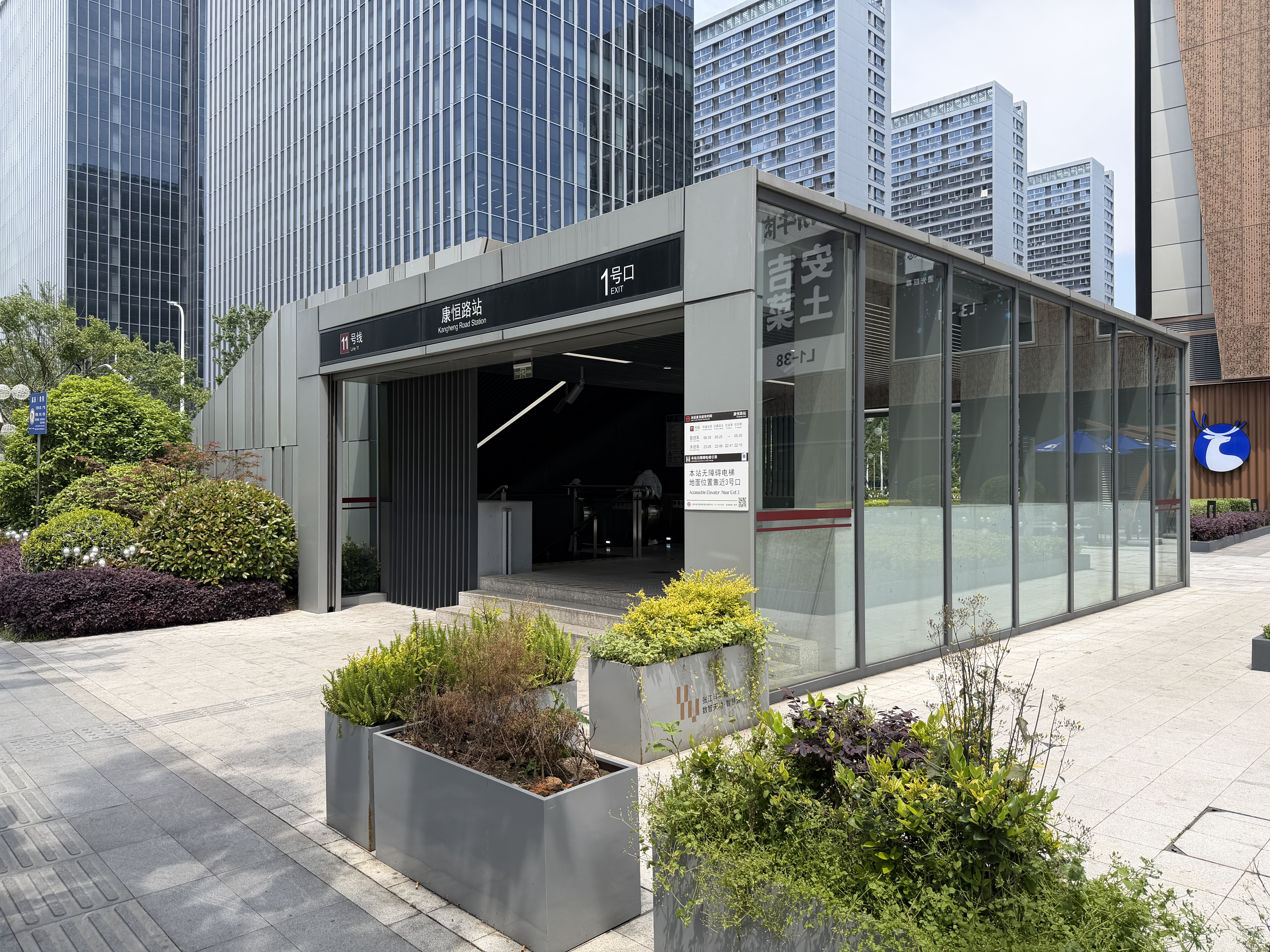
Exit 1

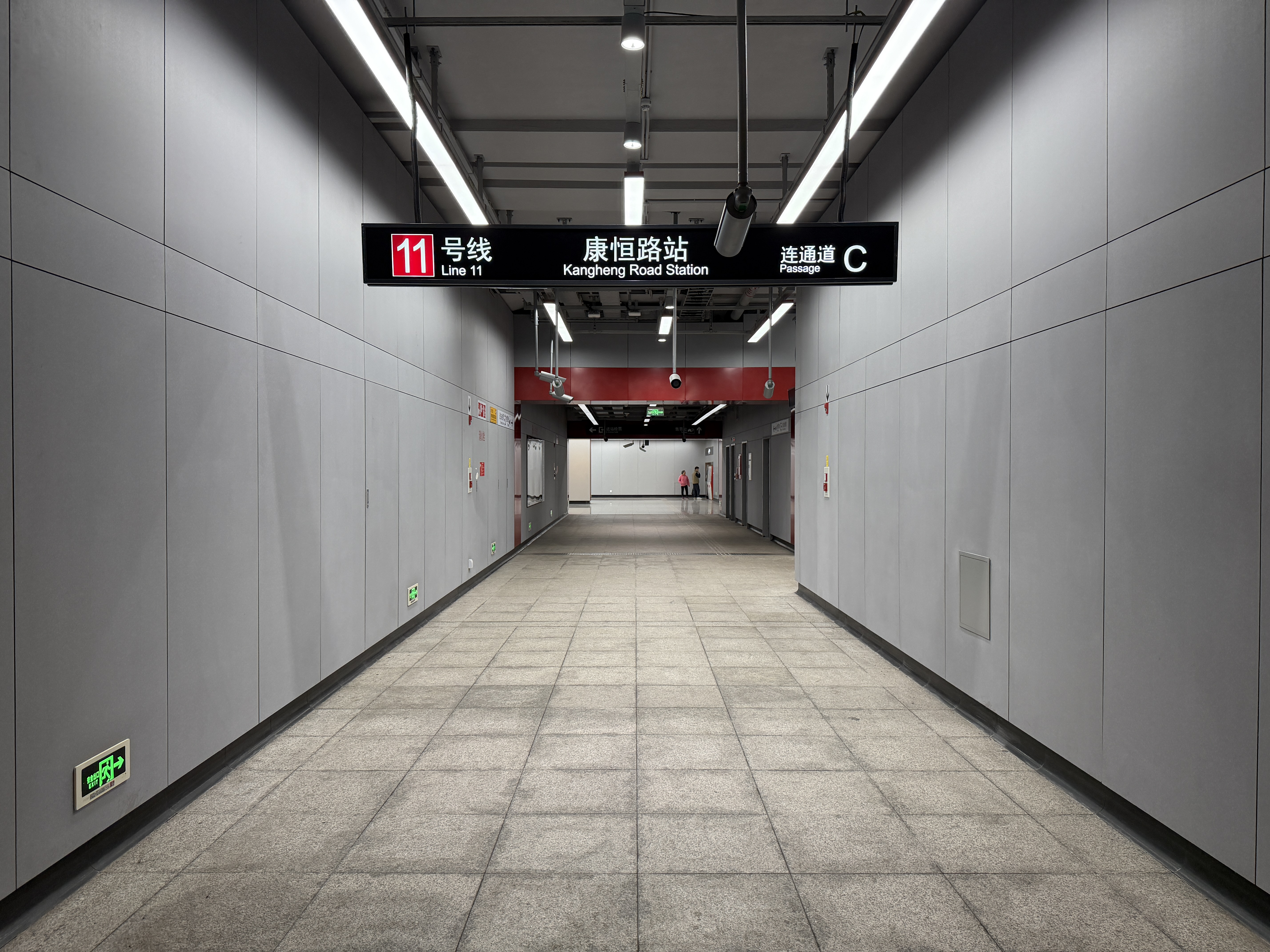
Passage C

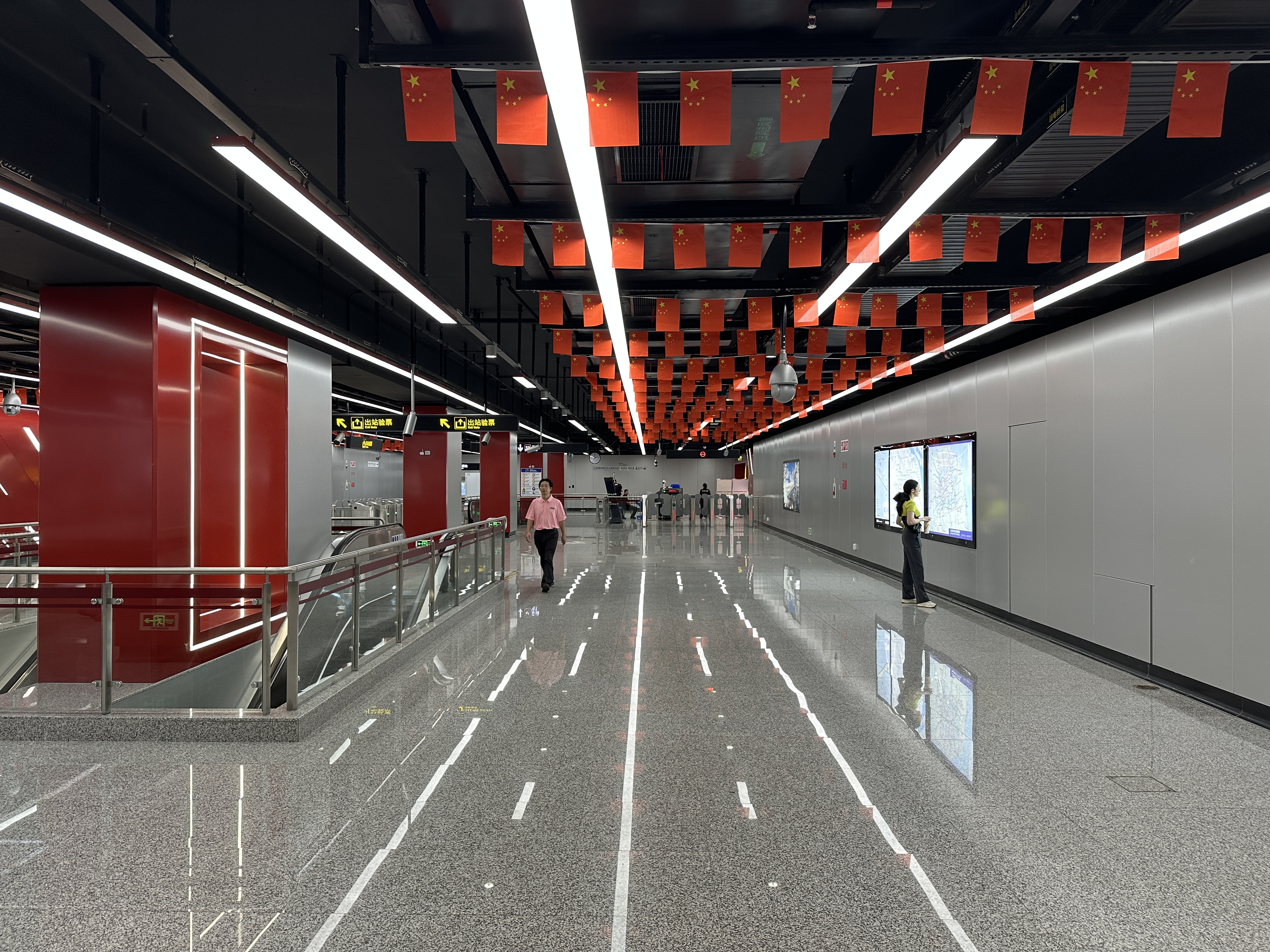
Concourse
