= East Changji Road station =

Shanghai Metro station

East Changji Road 昌吉东路
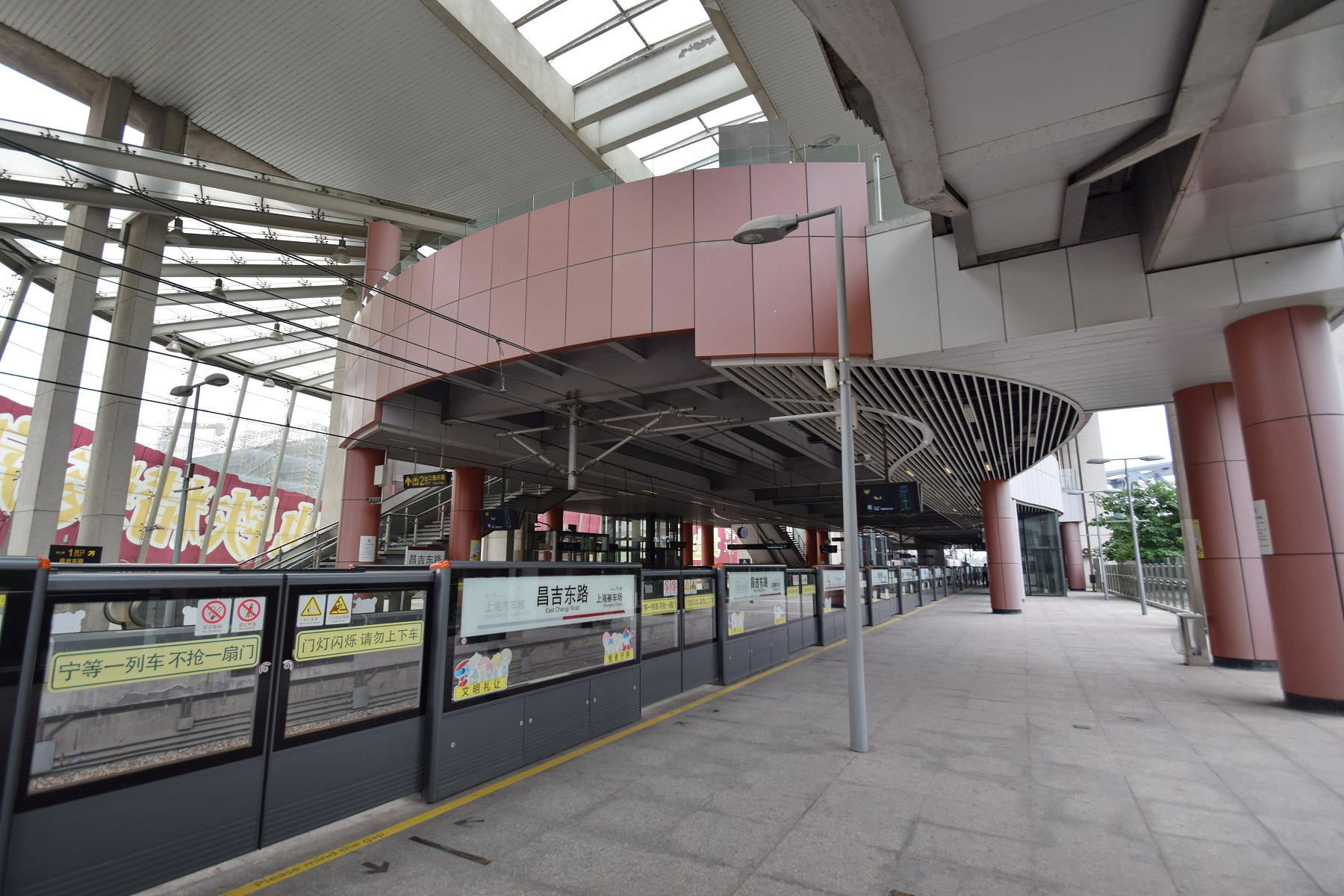
- Station platform, Disney Resort-bound side

General information
- Location: Jiading District, Shanghai; China
- Coordinates: 31°17′37″N 121°12′01″E
- Operator: Shanghai No. 2 Metro Operation Co. Ltd.
- Line: Line 11
- Platforms: 2 (2 side platforms)
- Tracks: 2

Construction
- Structure type: At-grade
- Accessible: Yes

History
- Opened: 26 April 2011

Services
Preceding station	Shanghai Metro	Following station
Shanghai Automobile City towards Huaqiao	Line 11 branch	Shanghai Circuit towards Disney Resort
Location
- Location within Shanghai

East Changji Road (simplified Chinese: 昌吉东路; traditional Chinese: 昌吉東路; pinyin: Chāngjí Dōnglù) is a station on the branch line of Line 11 of the Shanghai Metro. It opened on 26 April 2011.
