= Line 16 (2000 scheme) =

Withdrawn metro line in Shanghai, China

Overview
- Status: Planned
- Locale: Shanghai, China

Service
- Type: Rapid transit
- System: Shanghai Metro

Technical
- Track gauge: 1,435 mm (4 ft 8 1/2 in)

Line 16 was a former metro line that was planned for construction between 2010~2020; the line starts from Hongkou Football Stadium, Hongkou District, via Shanghai Circus World, Shanghai West Railway Station, Shanghai Zoo, Lianhua Road, Meilong Town to Wujing Town, and Minhang District. The line can change to lines 1, 2, 3, 7, 8, 9, 10, 11, 12, 13, 14 and 15. As the "Line 16" designation has been usurped by a new line (which at the time was called Line 21), its current status is unknown.

== Construction Plan ==
- 1st Phase: Hongkou Football Stadium to Shanghai Zoo, 19 km (12 mi), 17 stations, will construct between 2010–2020.
- Left Part: From Shanghai Zoo, south to Wujing Town, no timetable given.
