= Anting station =

Shanghai Metro station

Anting 安亭站
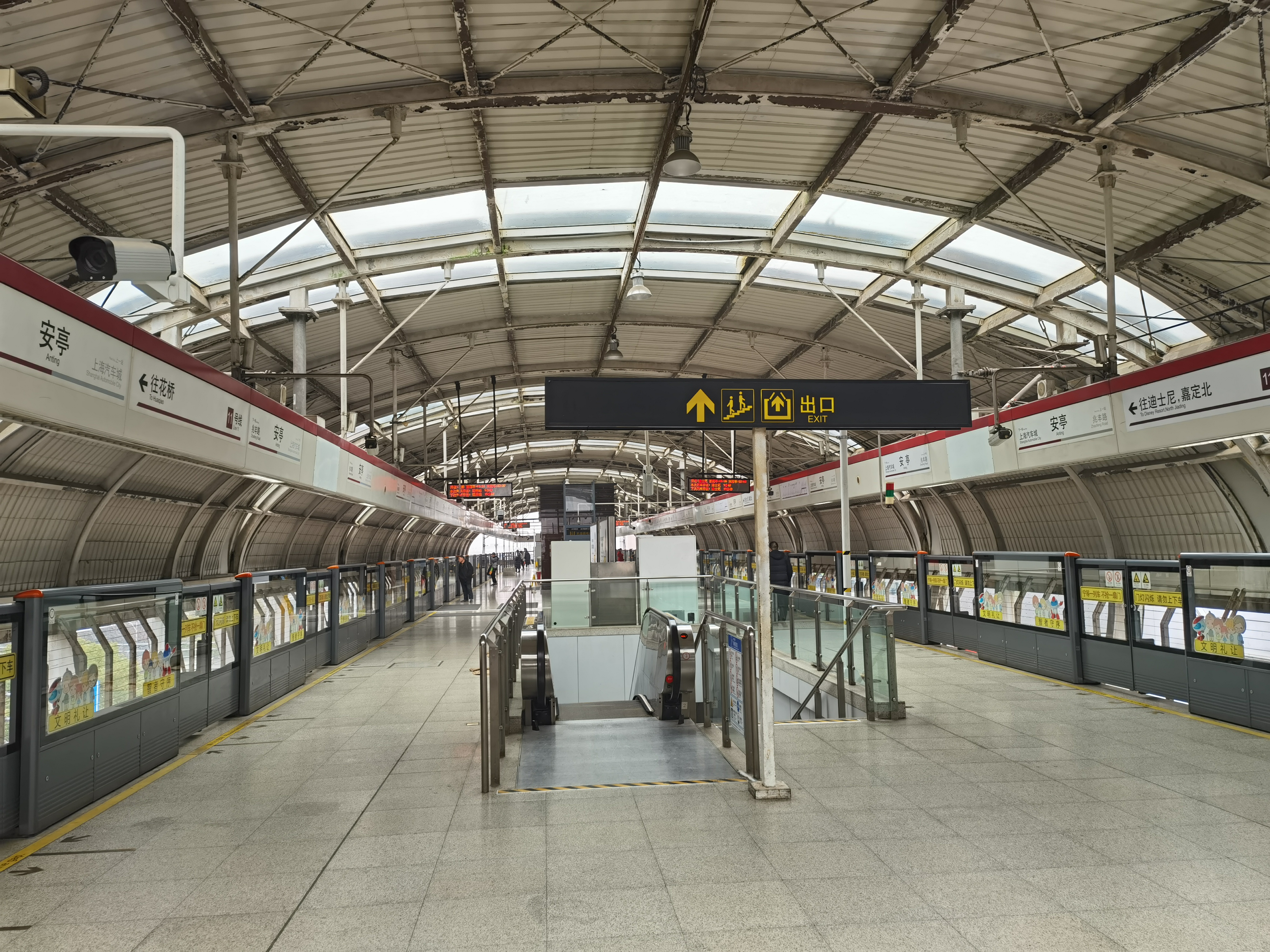
- Station platform

General information
- Location: Cao'an Highway (曹安公路) and Moyu Road (墨玉路); Anting, Jiading District, Shanghai; China
- Coordinates: 31°17′25″N 121°9′25″E
- Operator: Shanghai No. 2 Metro Operation Co. Ltd.
- Line: Line 11
- Platforms: 2 (1 island platform)
- Tracks: 2

Construction
- Structure type: Elevated
- Accessible: Yes

History
- Opened: 29 March 2010

Services
Preceding station	Shanghai Metro	Following station
Zhaofeng Road towards Huaqiao	Line 11 branch	Shanghai Automobile City towards Disney Resort
Location
- Location within Shanghai

Anting (Chinese: 安亭; pinyin: Āntíng) is a station on the branch line of Line 11 of the Shanghai Metro, located in the town of Anting in Jiading District. It is the last station in Shanghai on the branch line of Line 11 before entering Kunshan, Jiangsu. It served as the terminus of the line until the extension to Huaqiao in Jiangsu province on 16 October 2013.
