= Kangxin Highway station =

Shanghai Metro station

Kangxin Highway 康新公路
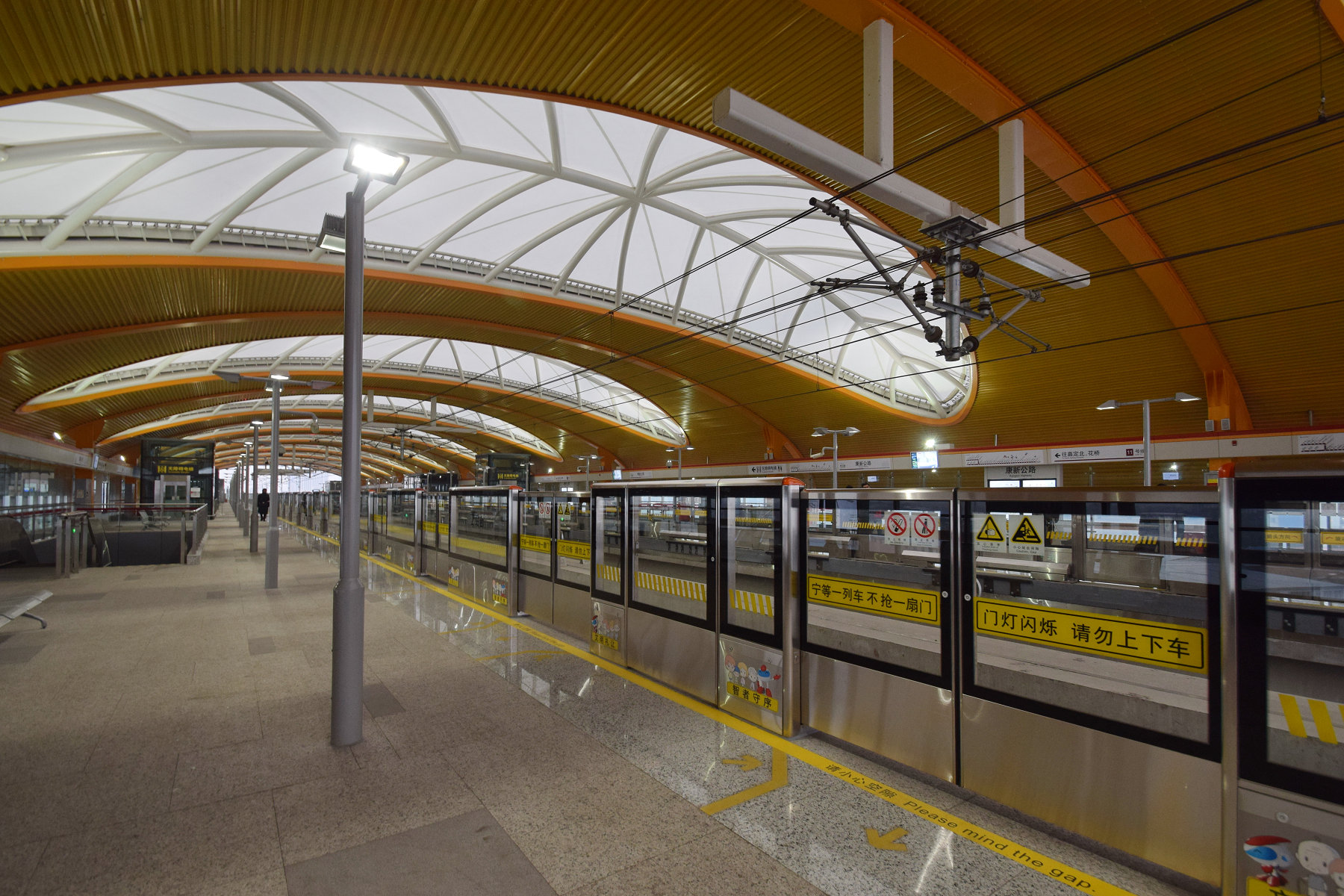
- Station platform, Disney Resort-bound side

General information
- Location: Kangqiao, Pudong, Shanghai; China
- Coordinates: 31°07′57″N 121°36′47″E
- Operator: Shanghai No. 2 Metro Operation Co. Ltd.
- Line: Line 11
- Platforms: 2 (2 side platforms)
- Tracks: 2

Construction
- Structure type: Elevated
- Accessible: Yes

History
- Opened: December 19, 2015

Services
Preceding station	Shanghai Metro	Following station
Xiuyan Road towards North Jiading or Huaqiao	Line 11	Disney Resort Terminus
Location
- Location within Shanghai

Kangxin Highway (Chinese: 康新公路; pinyin: Kāngxīn Gōnglù) is a station on Line 11 of the Shanghai Metro. It opened on December 19, 2015, as the terminus of an extension of Line 11 beyond Luoshan Road station. After the opening of the Shanghai Disney Resort, Disney Resort station became the new terminus of the line.

This station used to be known as Hengxin Road (simplified Chinese: 横新路; traditional Chinese: 橫新路; pinyin: Héngxīn Lù).
