= Songjiang Xincheng station =

Shanghai Metro station

Songjiang Xincheng 松江新城
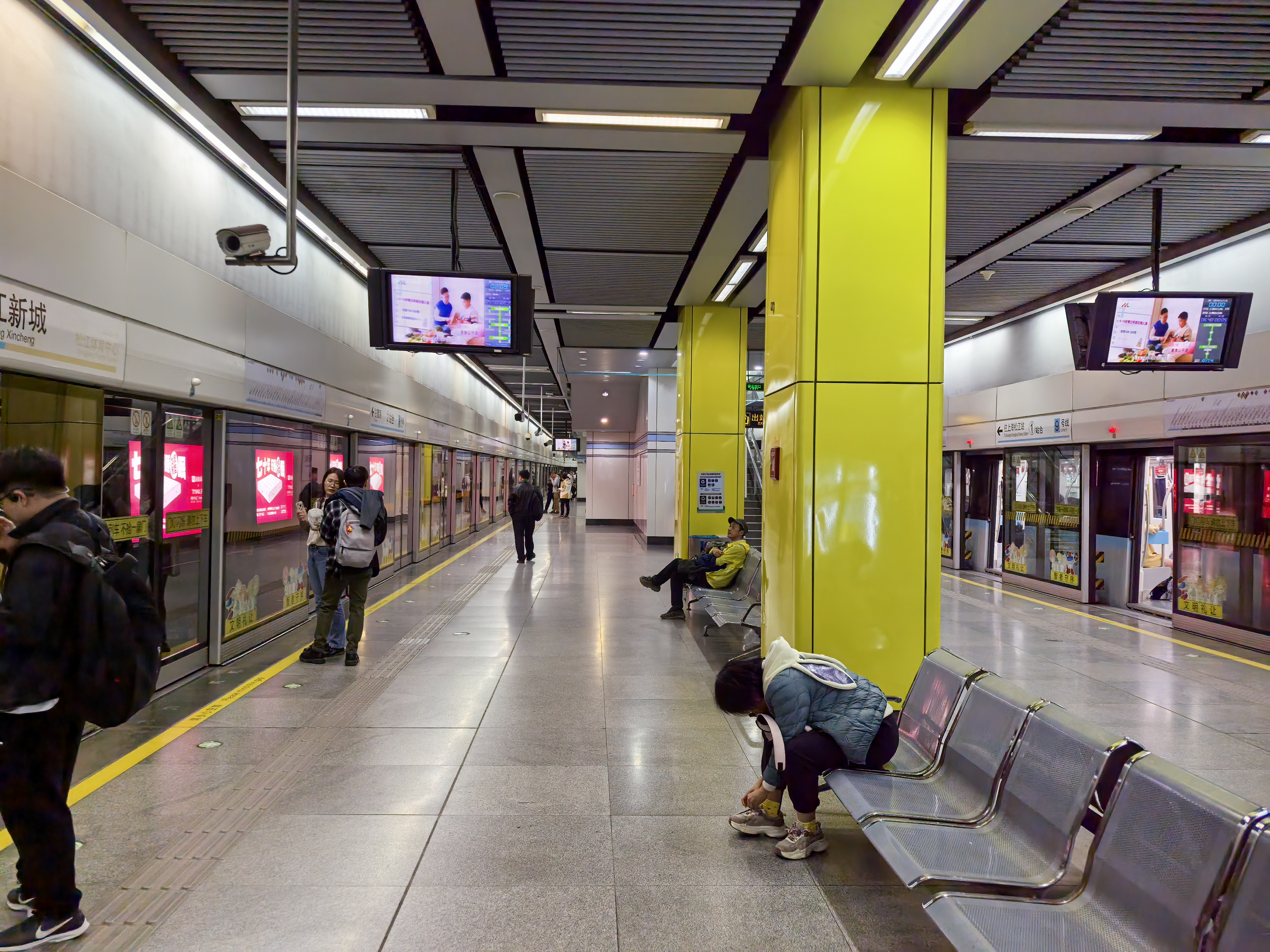
- Station platform

General information
- Location: South Jiasong Road (嘉松南路); Songjiang District, Shanghai; China
- Coordinates: 31°1′58″N 121°13′34″E
- Operator: Shanghai No. 1 Metro Operation Co. Ltd.
- Line: Line 9
- Platforms: 2 (1 island platform)
- Tracks: 2

Construction
- Structure type: Underground
- Accessible: Yes

History
- Opened: December 29, 2007

Services
Preceding station	Shanghai Metro	Following station
Songjiang Sports Center towards Shanghai Songjiang Railway Station	Line 9	Songjiang University Town towards Caolu
Location
- Location within Shanghai

Songjiang Xincheng (Chinese: 松江新城; pinyin: Sōngjiāng Xīnchéng) is a station of Shanghai Metro Line 9. It began operation on December 29, 2007. It served as the terminus of the line until the extension to Songjiang South Railway Station opened on December 30, 2012.
