= South Changjiang Road station =

Shanghai Metro station

South Changjiang Road 长江南路
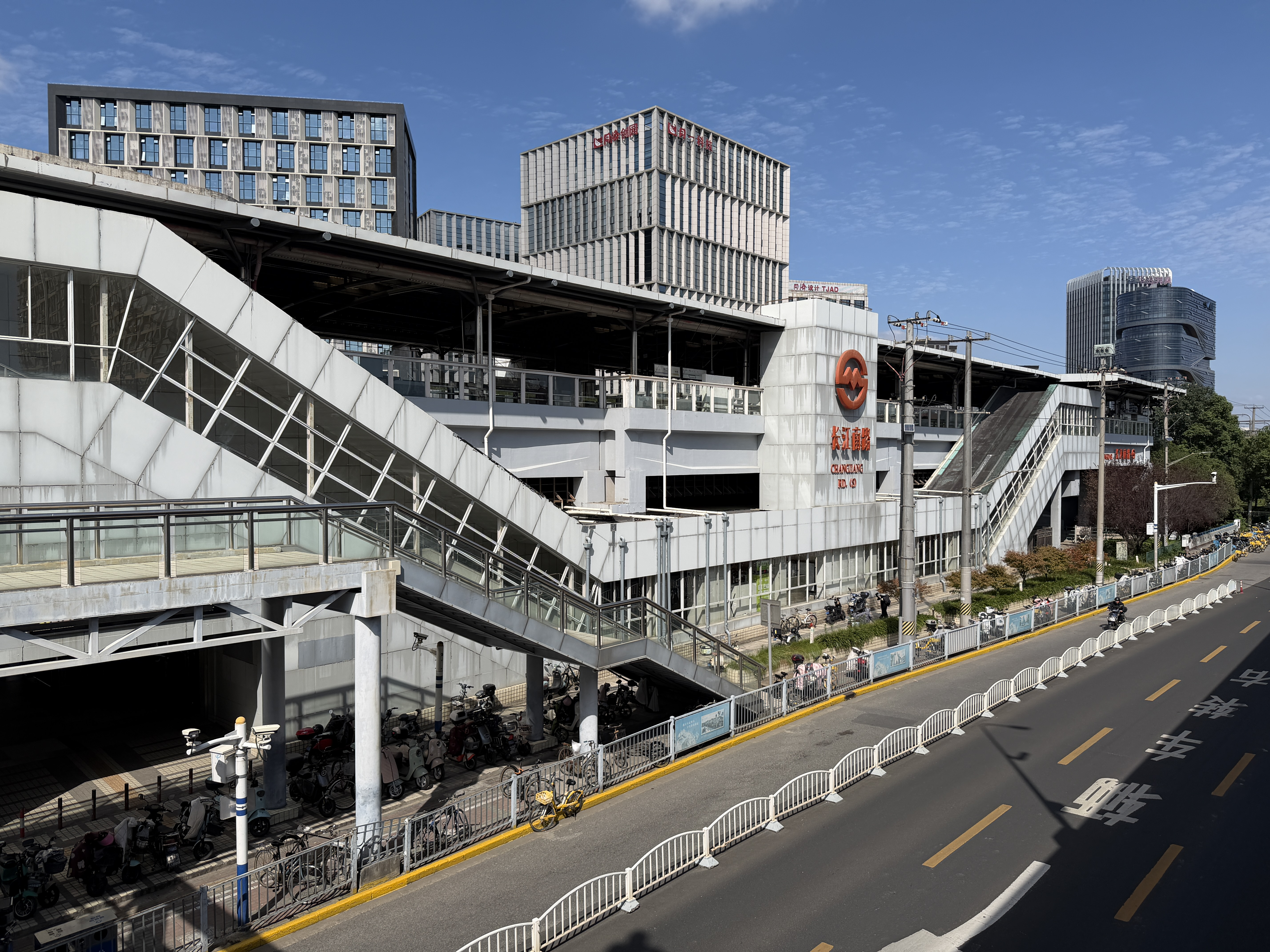
- Station exterior

General information
- Location: Yixian Road (逸仙路) and South Changjiang Road; Songnan, Baoshan District, Shanghai; China
- Coordinates: 31°19′55″N 121°29′29″E
- Operator: Shanghai No. 3 Metro Operation Co. Ltd.
- Lines: Line 3; Line 18
- Platforms: 4 (1 island platform and 2 side platforms)
- Tracks: 4

Construction
- Structure type: Elevated (Line 3); Underground (Line 18)
- Accessible: Yes

History
- Opened: 18 December 2006; 19 years ago (Line 3); 30 December 2021; 4 years ago (Line 18)

Services
Preceding station	Shanghai Metro	Following station
Songfa Road towards North Jiangyang Road	Line 3	West Yingao Road towards Shanghai South Railway Station
Tongnan Road towards Kangwen Road	Line 18	Yingao Road towards Hangtou
Location
- Location within Shanghai

South Changjiang Road (simplified Chinese: 长江南路; traditional Chinese: 長江南路; pinyin: Chángjiāng Nán Lù) is a station on Shanghai Metro Line 3. It is part of the northern extension of that line from Jiangwan Town to North Jiangyang Road that opened on 18 December 2006. It later became an interchange station after the opening of Line 18 on 30 December 2021.

== Short-turn trains ==
Because northern Baoshan District is largely suburban, half of line 3 trains terminate early here.

== Station Layout ==
2F	Side platform, doors open on the right
2F	Northbound	← Line 3 towards North Jiangyang Road (Songfa Road)
2F	Southbound	Line 3 towards Shanghai South Railway Station (West Yingao Road) →
2F	Side platform, doors open on the right
G	Line 3 Concourse	Exits 1-2, Faregates, Station Agent
G	Line 18 Entrances and Exits	Exits 3-4
B1	Line 18 Concourse	Faregates, Station Agent
B2	Northbound	← Line 18 termination track
B2	Island platform, doors open on the left
B2	Southbound	Line 18 towards Hangtou (Yingao Road) →
