= Zhaoxiang station =

Shanghai Metro station

Zhaoxiang 赵巷
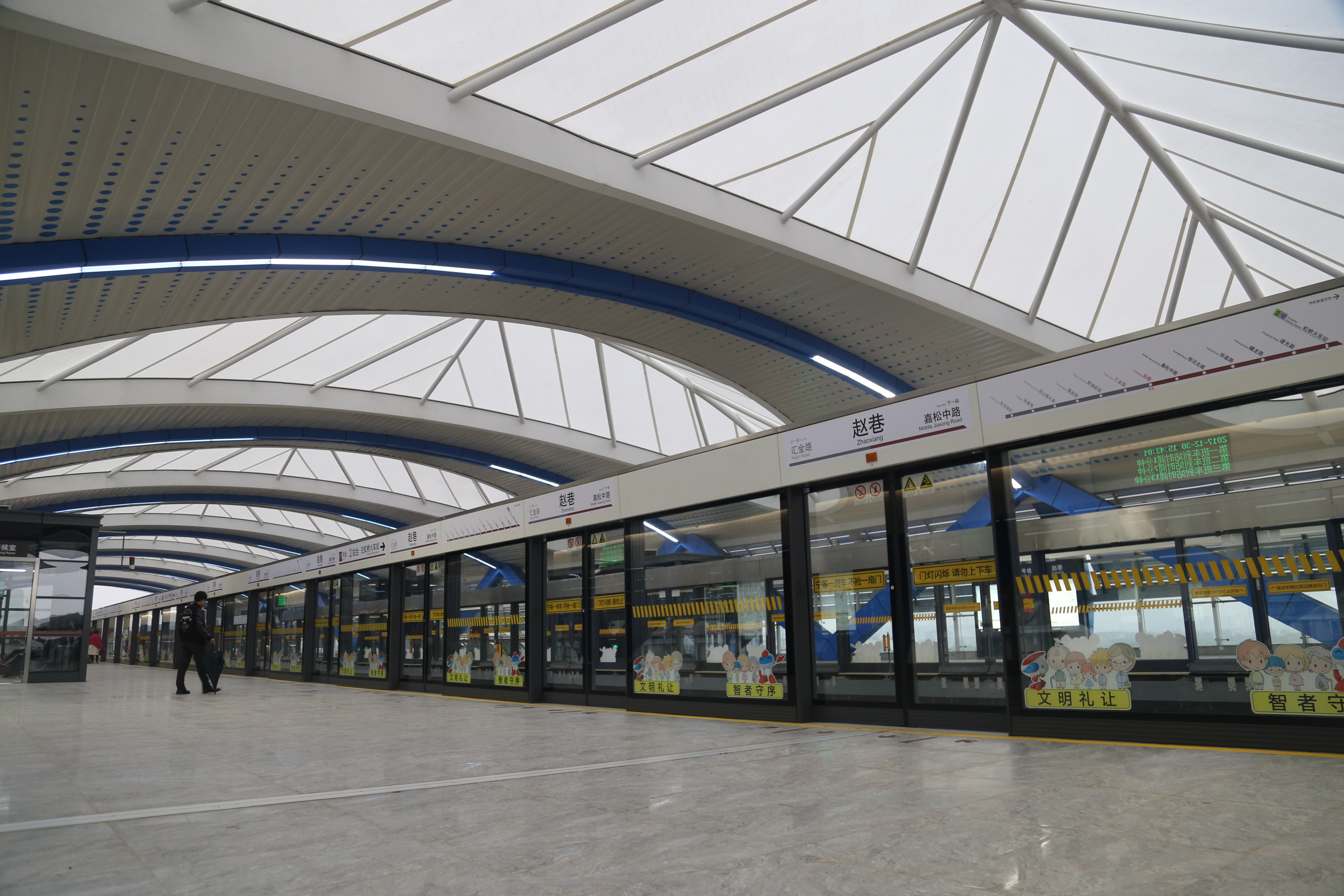
- Station platform, Hongqiao Railway Station-bound side

General information
- Location: East Yinggang Road and Zhaozhong Highway, Qingpu District, Shanghai; China
- Coordinates: 31.163237°N 121.187759°E
- Operator: Shanghai No. 2 Metro Operation Co. Ltd.
- Line: Line 17
- Platforms: 2 (2 side platforms)
- Tracks: 2

Construction
- Structure type: Elevated
- Accessible: Yes

History
- Opened: 30 December 2017

Services
Preceding station	Shanghai Metro	Following station
Huijin Road towards Xicen	Line 17	Middle Jiasong Road towards Hongqiao Railway Station
Location
- Location within Shanghai

Zhaoxiang (simplified Chinese: 赵巷; traditional Chinese: 趙巷; pinyin: Zhàoxiàng) is a station on Line 17 of the Shanghai Metro. The station is located at the intersection of East Yinggang Road and Zhaozhong Highway in the city's Qingpu District, between Middle Jiasong Road and Huijin Road. It opened with the rest of Line 17 on 30 December 2017.

== History ==
The station opened for passenger trial operation on 30 December 2017, concurrent with the opening of the rest of Line 17.

== Description ==
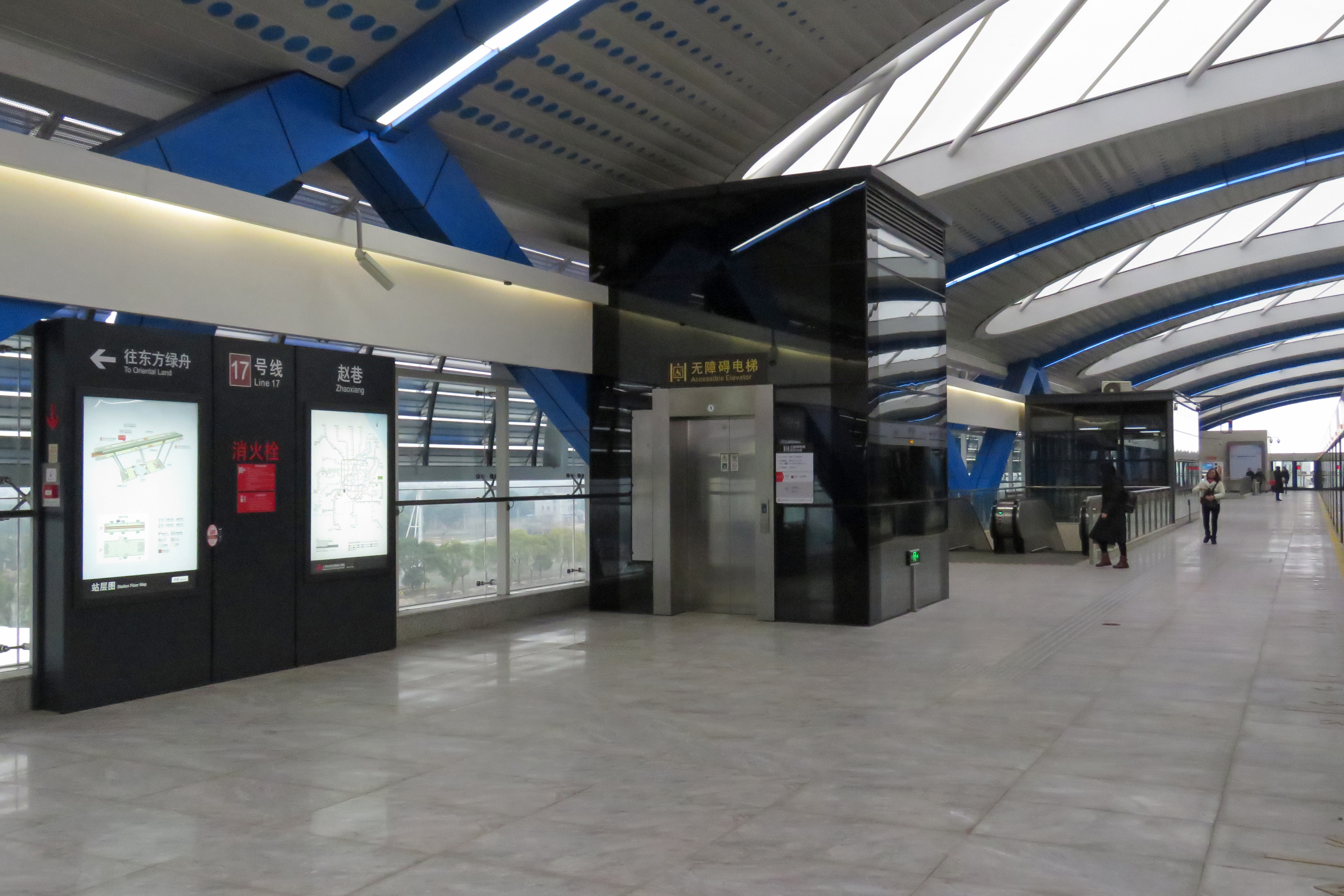
Station platform and elevator to concourse, Oriental Land-bound side

The station is located at the intersection of East Yinggang Road and Zhaozhong Highway in the Qingpu District of Shanghai. The station is named after the town of Zhaoxiang, which is located nearby. An elevated structure, the station consists of two floors, a platform level and concourse level, both located above the roadway of East Yinggang Road. At concourse level are the fare gates, ticket machines, and customer service counters. The concourse level can be reached via two exits which descend down to the street, one on each side of East Yinggang Road. Toilets can be found within the fare-paid zone at concourse level. The platform is located above the concourse and features two side platforms.

Like all stations on Line 17, this station is fully accessible from all entrances. There are a total of four elevators in the station: two connecting each exit with the concourse, and two connecting the concourse with each of the platforms within the fare-paid zone.

=== Exits ===
The station has two exits:

- Exit 1: East Yinggang Road south side, Zhaozhong Highway
- Exit 2: East Yinggang Road north side, Zhaozhong Highway
