= National Exhibition and Convention Center =

National Exhibition and Convention Center may refer to:

- National Exhibition and Convention Center (Shanghai), China
  - National Exhibition and Convention Center station, metro station in Shanghai
- National Exhibition and Convention Center (Tianjin), China

== See also ==
- National Exhibition Centre, Birmingham, England
