= Panlong Road station =

Shanghai Metro station

Panlong Road 蟠龙路
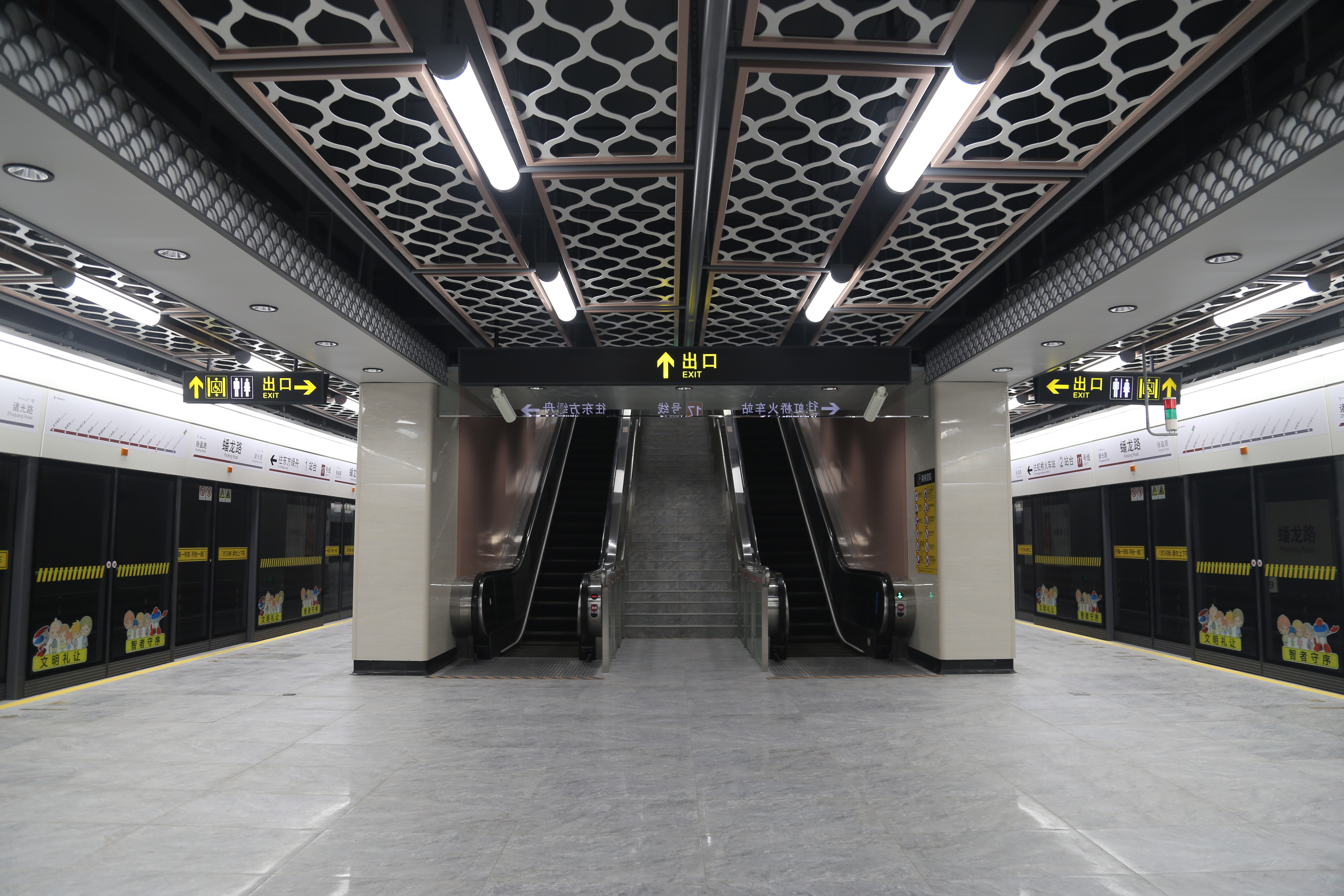
- Station platform

General information
- Location: Songze Avenue and Panlong Road, Qingpu District, Shanghai; China
- Coordinates: 31.188402°N 121.273932°E
- Operator: Shanghai No. 2 Metro Operation Co. Ltd.
- Line: Line 17
- Platforms: 2 (1 island platform)
- Tracks: 2

Construction
- Structure type: Underground
- Accessible: Yes

History
- Opened: 30 December 2017; 8 years ago

Services
Preceding station	Shanghai Metro	Following station
Xuying Road towards Xicen	Line 17	National Exhibition and Convention Center towards Hongqiao Railway Station
Location
- Location within Shanghai

Panlong Road (simplified Chinese: 蟠龙路; traditional Chinese: 蟠龍路; pinyin: Pánlóng Lù) is a station on Line 17 of the Shanghai Metro. The station is located at the intersection of Songze Avenue at Panlong Road in the city's Qingpu District, between Zhuguang Road and Xuying Road. It opened with the rest of Line 17 on 30 December 2017.

== History ==
The station opened for passenger trial operation on 30 December 2017, concurrent with the opening of the rest of Line 17.

== Description ==
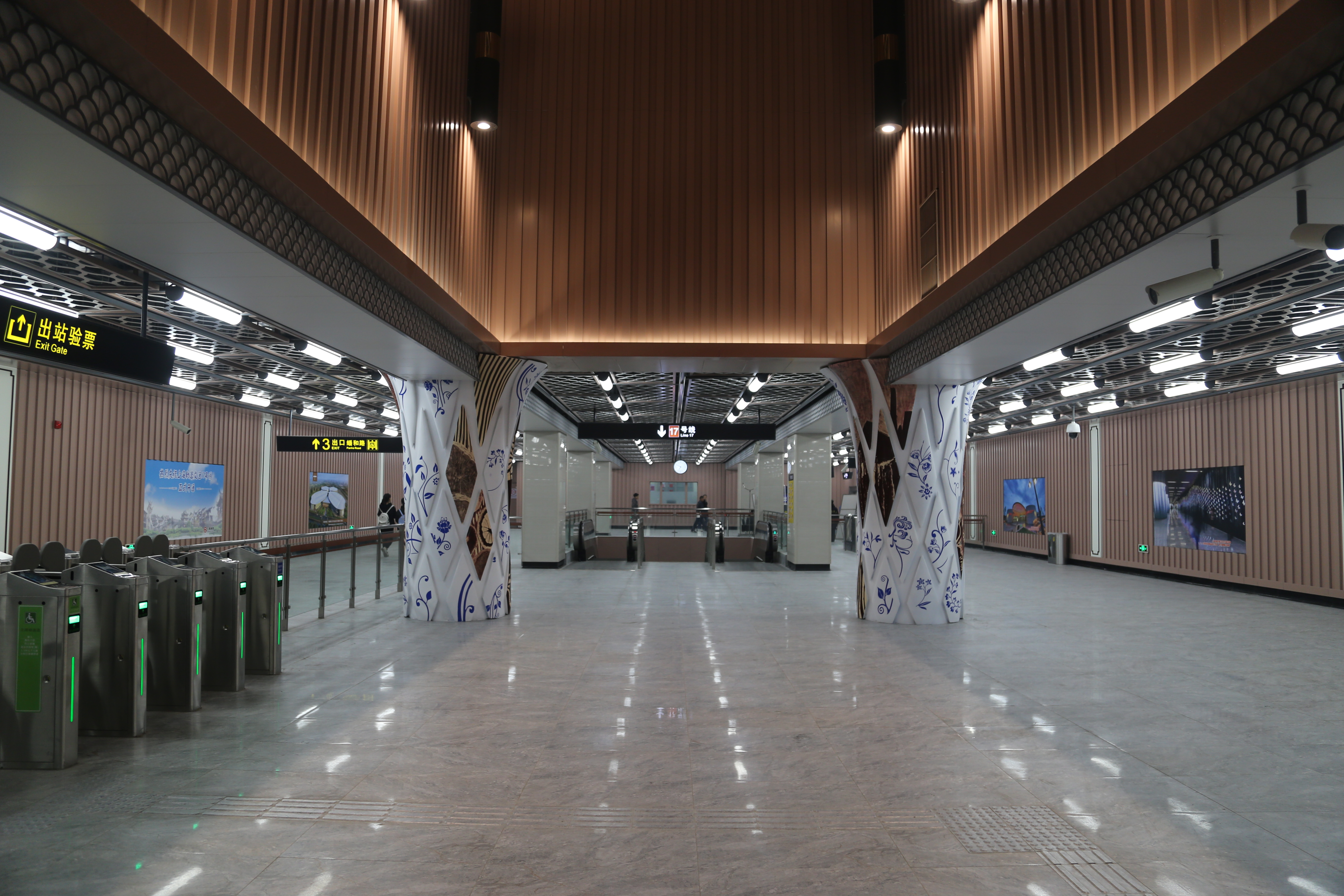
Station concourse

The station is located at the intersection of Songze Avenue and Panlong Road, in the Qingpu District of Shanghai. An underground station, the station consists of three floors. From street level, passengers descend a concourse level with fare gates, ticket machines, and a customer service counter. The platforms are located one level beneath the concourse level. Toilets are available at the east end of the platform, within the fare-paid zone.

Like all stations on Line 17, the station is fully accessible. An elevator connects the street level to the concourse level near Exit 3. Within the fare-paid zone, an elevator connects the concourse level to the platform level.

=== Exits ===
There are three exits of the station:

- Exit 1: Songze Avenue, Panlong Road
- Exit 2: Panlong Road
- Exit 3: Panhe Road
