= Middle Jiasong Road station =

Shanghai Metro station

Middle Jiasong Road 嘉松中路
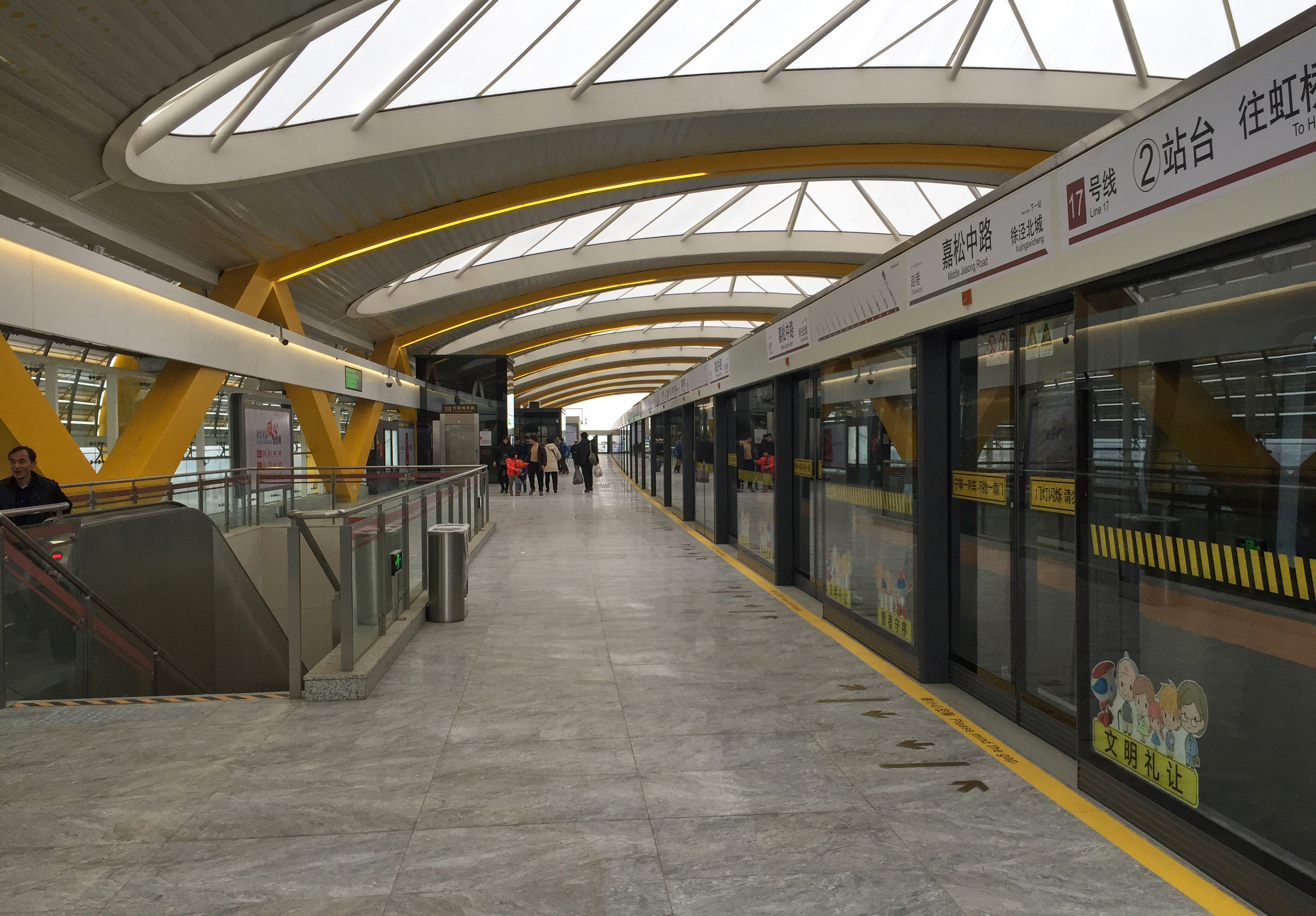
- Station platform, Hongqiao Railway Station-bound side

General information
- Location: East Yinggang Road and Middle Jiasong Road, Qingpu District, Shanghai; China
- Coordinates: 31.166114°N 121.219458°E
- Operator: Shanghai No. 2 Metro Operation Co. Ltd.
- Line: Line 17
- Platforms: 2 (2 side platforms)
- Tracks: 2

Construction
- Structure type: Elevated
- Accessible: Yes

History
- Opened: 30 December 2017

Services
Preceding station	Shanghai Metro	Following station
Zhaoxiang towards Xicen	Line 17	Xujingbeicheng towards Hongqiao Railway Station
Location
- Location within Shanghai

Middle Jiasong Road (Chinese: 嘉松中路; pinyin: Jiāsōng Zhōnglù) is a station on Line 17 of the Shanghai Metro. The station is located at the intersection of East Yinggang Road and Middle Jiasong Road in the city's Qingpu District, between Xujingbeicheng and Zhaoxiang. This station opened with the rest of Line 17 on 30 December 2017.

== History ==
The station opened for passenger trial operation on 30 December 2017, concurrent with the opening of the rest of Line 17.

== Description ==
The station is located at the intersection of East Yinggang Road and Middle Jiasong Road, in the Qingpu District of Shanghai. An elevated structure, the station consists of two floors, a platform level and concourse level, both located above the roadway of East Yinggang Road. At concourse level are the fare gates, ticket machines, and a customer service counter. The concourse level can be reached via two exits which descend to street level, one on each side of East Yinggang Road. Toilets are available within the fare-paid zone at concourse level. The platform level is located above the concourse level and features two side platforms.

Like all stations on Line 17, the station is fully accessible from all entrances. There are a total of four elevators in the station: two connecting each exit with concourse level, and two connecting the concourse level with each of the side platforms within the fare-paid zone.

=== Exits ===
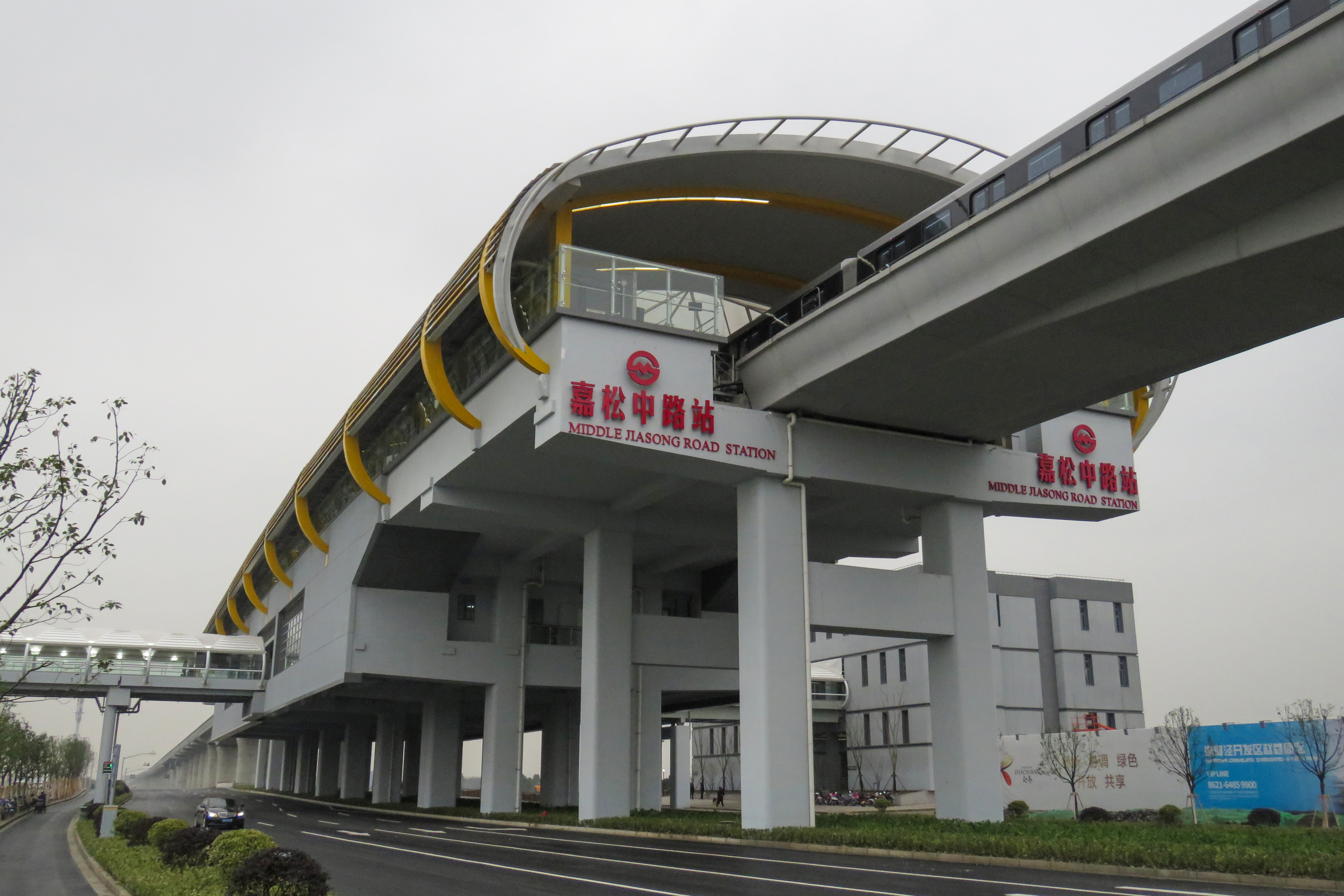
Station exterior

The station has two exits:

- Exit 1: East Yinggang Road north side, Middle Jiasong Road
- Exit 2: East Yinggang Road south side, Middle Jiasong Road
