= Xuying Road station =

Shanghai Metro station

Xuying Road 徐盈路
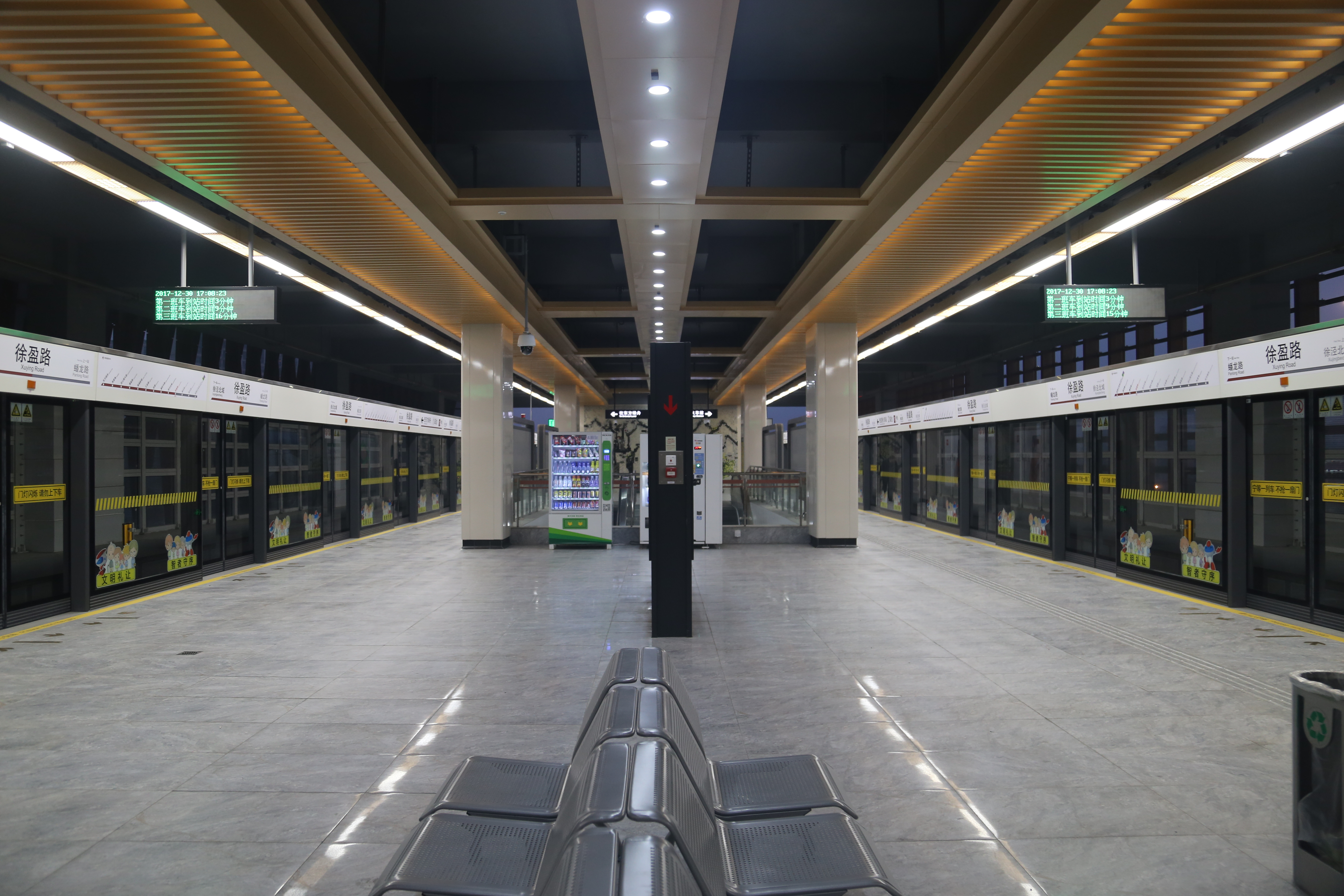
- Station platform

General information
- Location: Songze Avenue and Xuying Road, Qingpu District, Shanghai; China
- Coordinates: 31.180108°N 121.249535°E
- Operator: Shanghai No. 2 Metro Operation Co. Ltd.
- Line: Line 17
- Platforms: 2 (1 island platform)
- Tracks: 2

Construction
- Structure type: Elevated
- Accessible: Yes

History
- Opened: 30 December 2017

Services
Preceding station	Shanghai Metro	Following station
Xujingbeicheng towards Xicen	Line 17	Panlong Road towards Hongqiao Railway Station
Location
- Location within Shanghai

Xuying Road (Chinese: 徐盈路; pinyin: Xúyíng Lù) is a station on Line 17 of the Shanghai Metro. The station is located at the intersection of Songze Avenue and Xuying Road in the city's Qingpu District, between Panlong Road and Xujingbeicheng. This station opened with the rest of Line 17 on 30 December 2017.

== History ==
The station opened for passenger trial operation on 30 December 2017, concurrent with the opening of the rest of Line 17.

== Description ==
Like all stations on Line 17, the station is fully accessible, with three elevators. Two elevators connect the street level to the concourse level at Exits 4 and 5, on the south and north side of Songze Avenue respectively. A third elevator connects the concourse to the platform within the fare-paid zone.

=== Exits ===
There are currently three exits of the station in operation:

- Exit 1: Songze Avenue south side, Xuying Road west side
- Exit 4: Songze Avenue south side
- Exit 5: Songze Avenue north side, via footbridge

=== Metro infrastructure in the vicinity ===
To the east, the tracks descend from an elevated section above the street to an underground section just before Panlong Road. To the west, between this station and Xujingbeicheng, is the Xujing train depot, which serves as a railway depot for Line 17.
