= Zhujiajiao station =

Shanghai Metro station

Zhujiajiao 朱家角
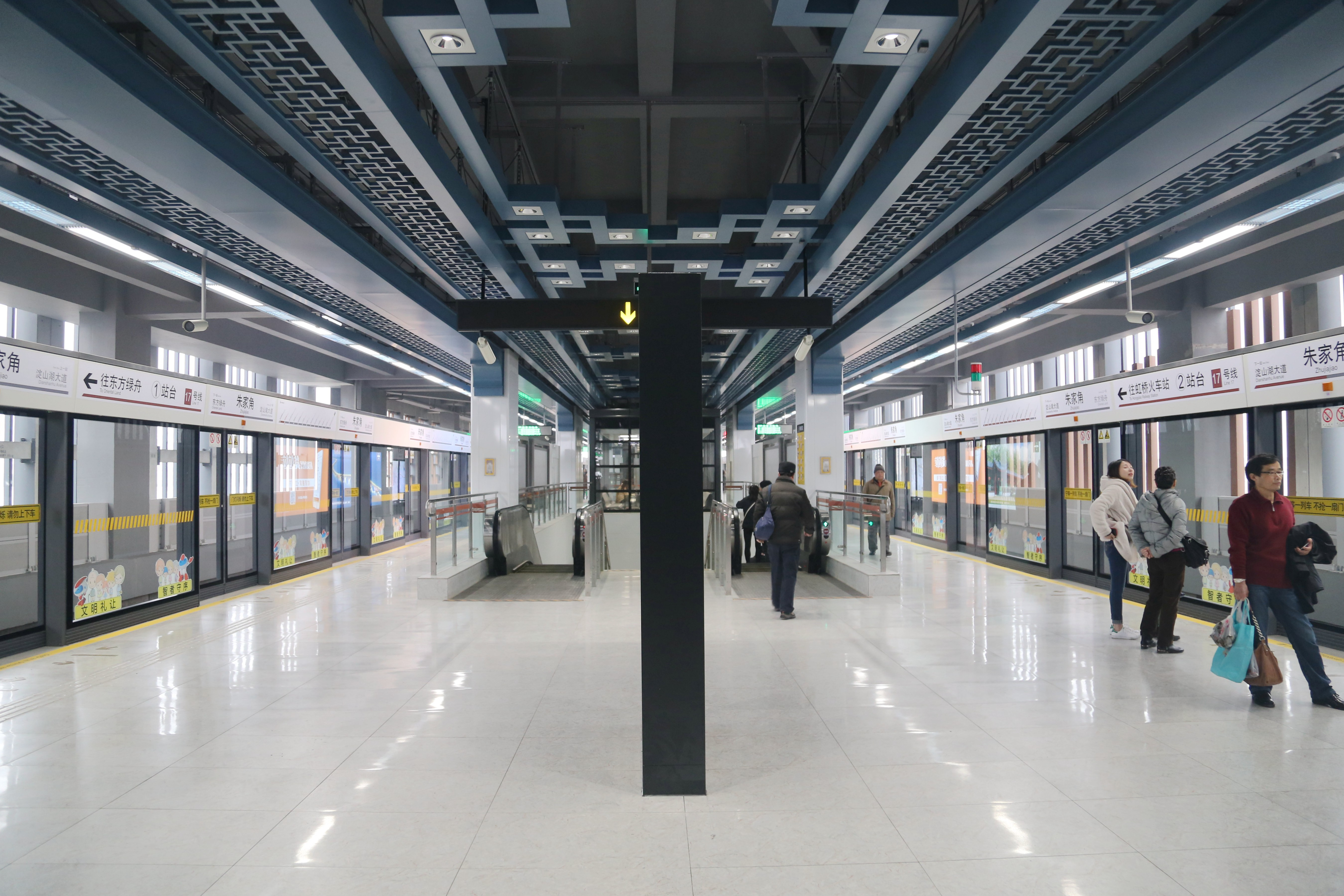
- Station platform

General information
- Location: Zhufeng Highway and Huqingping Highway, Zhujiajiao, Qingpu District, Shanghai; China
- Coordinates: 31.102531°N 121.044451°E
- Operator: Shanghai No. 2 Metro Operation Co. Ltd.
- Line: Line 17
- Platforms: 2 (1 island platform)
- Tracks: 2

Construction
- Structure type: Elevated
- Accessible: Yes

History
- Opened: 30 December 2017

Services
Preceding station	Shanghai Metro	Following station
Oriental Land towards Xicen	Line 17	Dianshanhu Avenue towards Hongqiao Railway Station
Location
- Location within Shanghai

Zhujiajiao (Chinese: 朱家角; pinyin: Zhūjiājiǎo) is a Shanghai Metro station in Shanghai's Qingpu District. Located at the intersection of Zhufeng Highway and Huqingping Highway, the station is named after the nearby Zhujiajiao town, an ancient canal town and major tourist attraction in Shanghai. The station is served by Line 17 trains and is situated between Dianshanhu Avenue and Oriental Land, the western terminus of the line. It opened with the rest of Line 17 on 30 December 2017. However, despite being named after Zhujiajiao, the station is located about 1.5 km (0.93 mi) away from the Zhujiajiao water town and tourist area.

== History ==
The station opened for passenger trial operations on 30 December 2017, concurrent with the opening of the rest of Line 17.

== Description ==
The station is located at the southwest corner of Zhufeng Highway and Huqingping Highway, in the Qingpu District of Shanghai. An elevated structure, the concourse level is connected by three entrances, two of which descend to street level on the south side of Huqingping Highway, and another which connects to the north side of the roadway via a pedestrian footbridge. Above the concourse level is the platform level, which consists of a single island platform. Toilets are located at the west end of the platform, within the fare-paid zone.

Like all stations on Line 17, Zhujiajiao station is fully accessible. The station is served by three elevators. Two elevators connect the street level to the concourse, from both the north and south sides of the street, near Exits 1 and 2 respectively. A third elevator connects the concourse to the platform within the fare-paid zone.

=== Exits ===
The station has three operational exits:

- Exit 1: Huqingping Highway north side, Zhufeng Highway (over footbridge)
- Exit 2: Huqingping Highway south side, Zhufeng Highway
- Exit 5: Huqingping Highway

=== Metro infrastructure in the vicinity ===
To the west of the station is the Zhujiajiao rail yard, which serves as a storage yard for trains on Line 17.

== Nearby landmarks ==
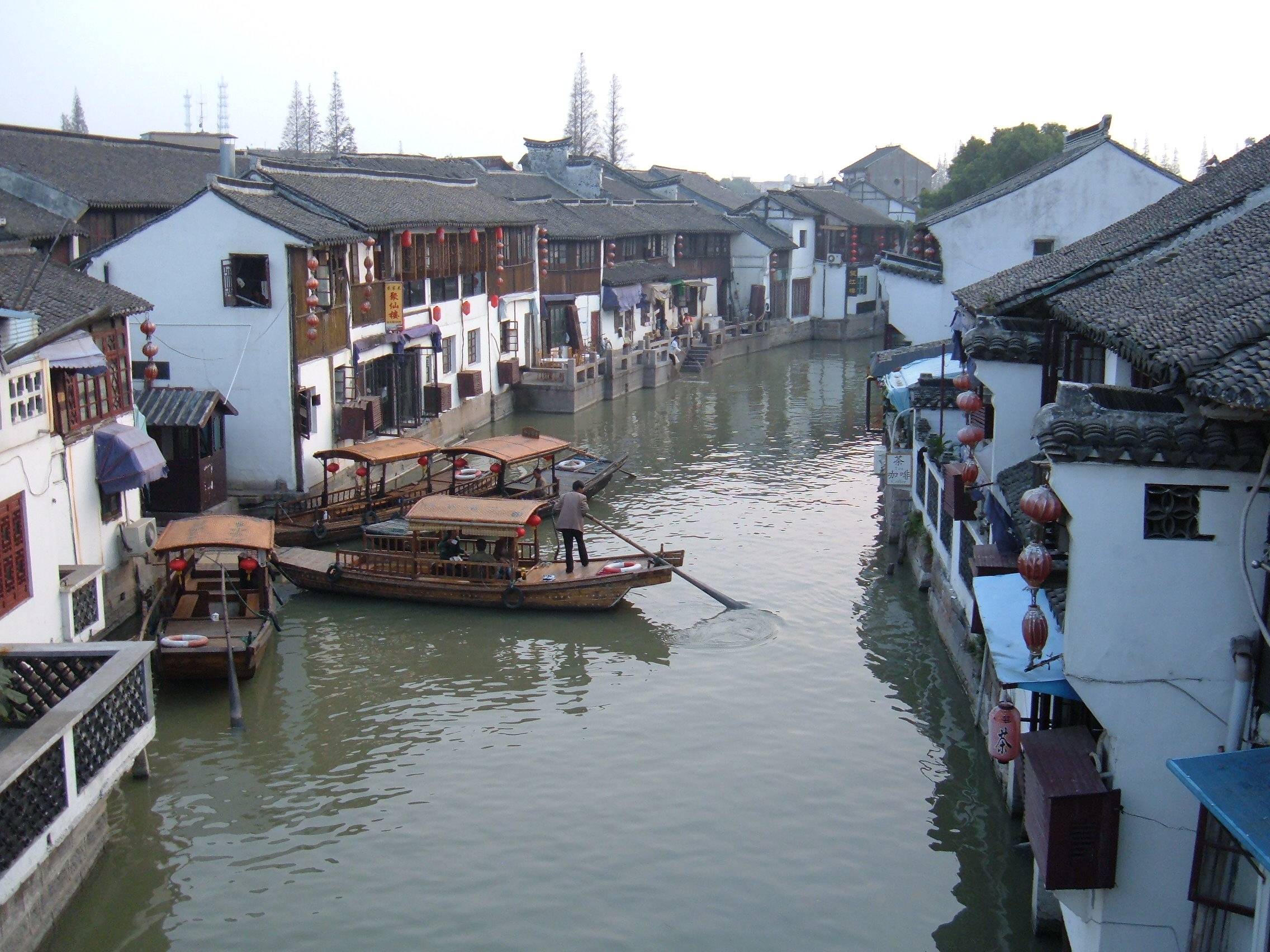
The nearby Zhujiajiao ancient town

The station is named after Zhujiajiao, an ancient town famous for its canals and a popular tourist destination. However, the station is located about 1.5 kilometres (0.93 mi) away from the actual tourist site.
