= Xujingbeicheng station =

Shanghai Metro station

Xujingbeicheng 徐泾北城
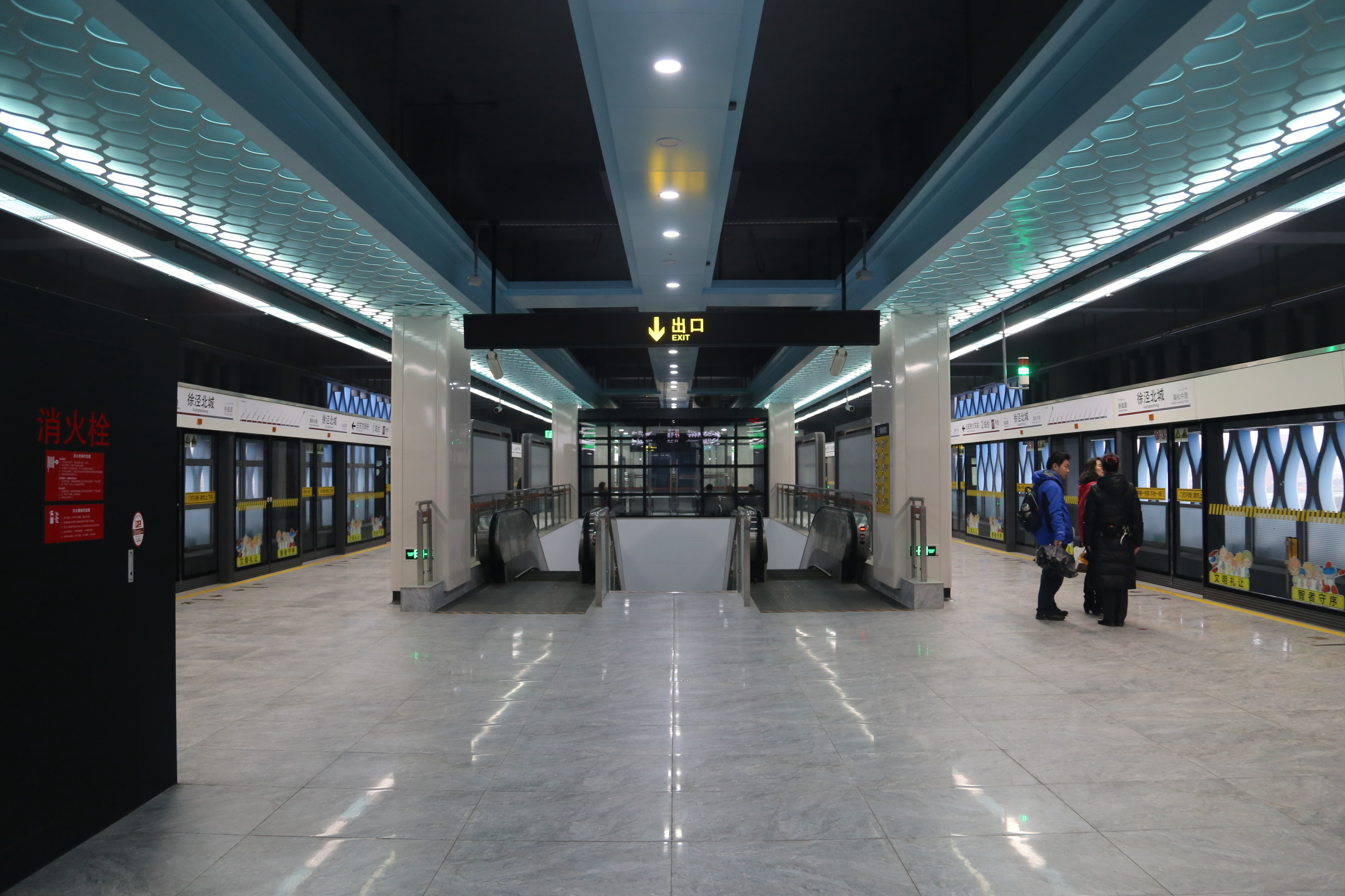
- Station platform

General information
- Location: Songze Avenue and Xule Road; Qingpu District, Shanghai; China
- Coordinates: 31.177549°N 121.237261°E
- Operator: Shanghai No. 2 Metro Operation Co. Ltd.
- Line: Line 17
- Platforms: 2 (1 island platform)
- Tracks: 2

Construction
- Structure type: Elevated
- Accessible: Yes

History
- Opened: 30 December 2017

Services
Preceding station	Shanghai Metro	Following station
Middle Jiasong Road towards Xicen	Line 17	Xuying Road towards Hongqiao Railway Station
Location
- Location within Shanghai

Xujingbeicheng (simplified Chinese: 徐泾北城; traditional Chinese: 徐涇北城; pinyin: Xújīngběichéng) is a station on Line 17 of the Shanghai Metro. The station is located at the intersection of Songze Avenue and Xule Road in the city's Qingpu District, between Xuying Road and Middle Jiasong Road. This station opened with the rest of Line 17 on 30 December 2017.

== History ==
The station opened for passenger trial operation on 30 December 2017, concurrent with the opening of the rest of Line 17.

== Description ==
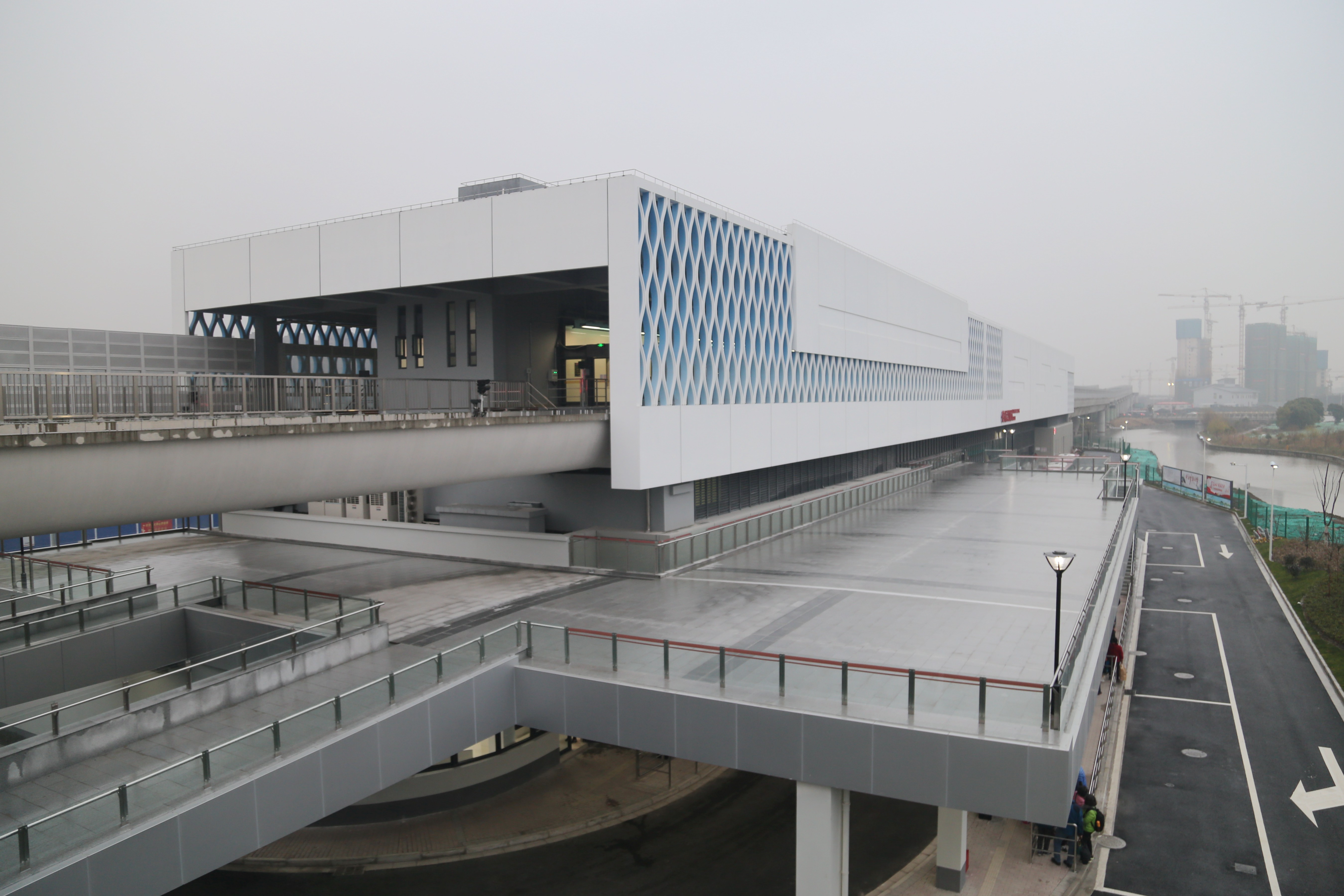
Station exterior

The station is located at the intersection of Songze Avenue and Xule Road, in the Qingpu District of Shanghai. An elevated station, the station consists of two floors. At street level are the exits and the concourse of the station, with fare gates, ticket machines, and a customer service counter. The platforms are located one level above. Toilets are available at the east end of the platform within the fare-paid zone.

Like all stations on Line 17, the station is fully accessible. An elevator connects the concourse to the platform within the fare-paid zone.

=== Exits ===
The station has three exits:

- Exit 1: Songze Avenue, Xule Road
- Exit 2: Songze Avenue
- Exit 3: Xule Road

=== Metro infrastructure in the vicinity ===
To the east, between this station and Xuying Road, is the Xujing train depot, which serves as a railway depot for Line 17. To the west, the tracks curve southwestward to meet with East Yinggang Road before arriving at Middle Jiasong Road.
