= Line 17 (Shanghai Metro) =

Shanghai Metro line

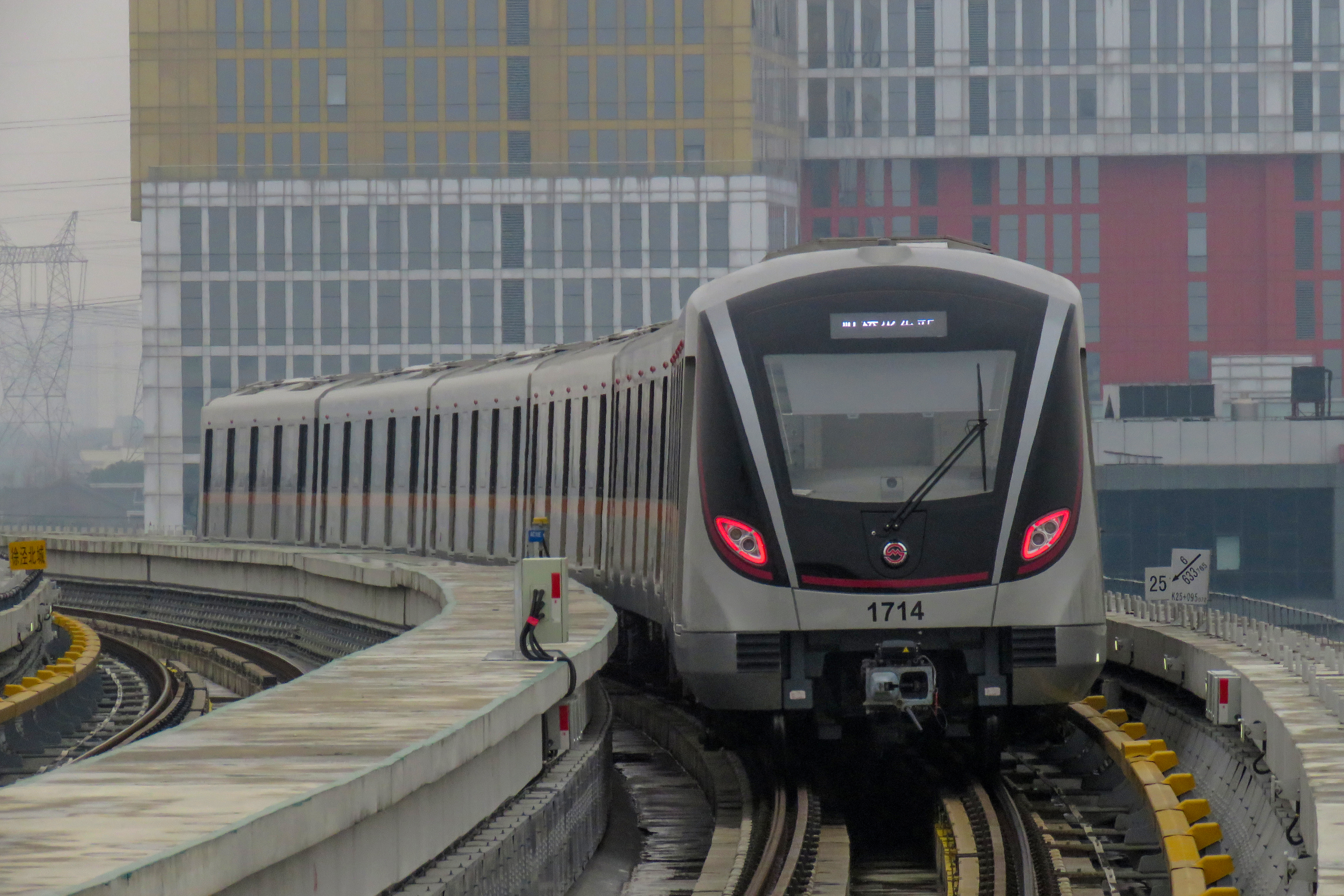
- A Hongqiao Railway Station-bound 17A01 train leaves Middle Jiasong Road.

Overview
- Other name(s): R2w (planned name); Line 20 (planned name between 2010 and 2012); Qingpu line (Chinese: 青浦线; 青浦線)
- Native name: 上海地铁17号线
- Status: Operational
- Owner: Shanghai Rail Transit Line 17 Development Co., Ltd.
- Locale: Minhang and Qingpu districts, Shanghai, China
- Termini: Hongqiao Railway Station; Xicen
- Stations: 14

Service
- Type: Rapid transit
- System: Shanghai Metro
- Operator: Shanghai No. 2 Metro Operation Co. Ltd.
- Depot(s): Xujing Depot; Zhujiajiao Yard
- Rolling stock: 17A01; 17A02
- Daily ridership: 175,000 (2019 peak)

History
- Work began: July 1, 2014; 12 years ago
- Opened: December 30, 2017; 8 years ago

Technical
- Track length: 41.6 km (25.8 mi)
- Number of tracks: 2
- Character: Underground: Hongqiao Railway Station ↔ Xuying Road & Huijin Road ↔ Dianshanhu Avenue 16.2km, 7 stations Elevated: Xicen ↔ Zhujiajiao & Huijin Road ↔ Xuying Road 25.4km, 7 stations
- Track gauge: 1,435 mm (4 ft 8 1/2 in)
- Electrification: Third rail, 1.5kV DC
- Operating speed: 100 km/h (62 mph); Average speed: 52.1 km/h (32 mph)
- Signalling: CASCO TRANAVI
Route map
To scale geographic map:
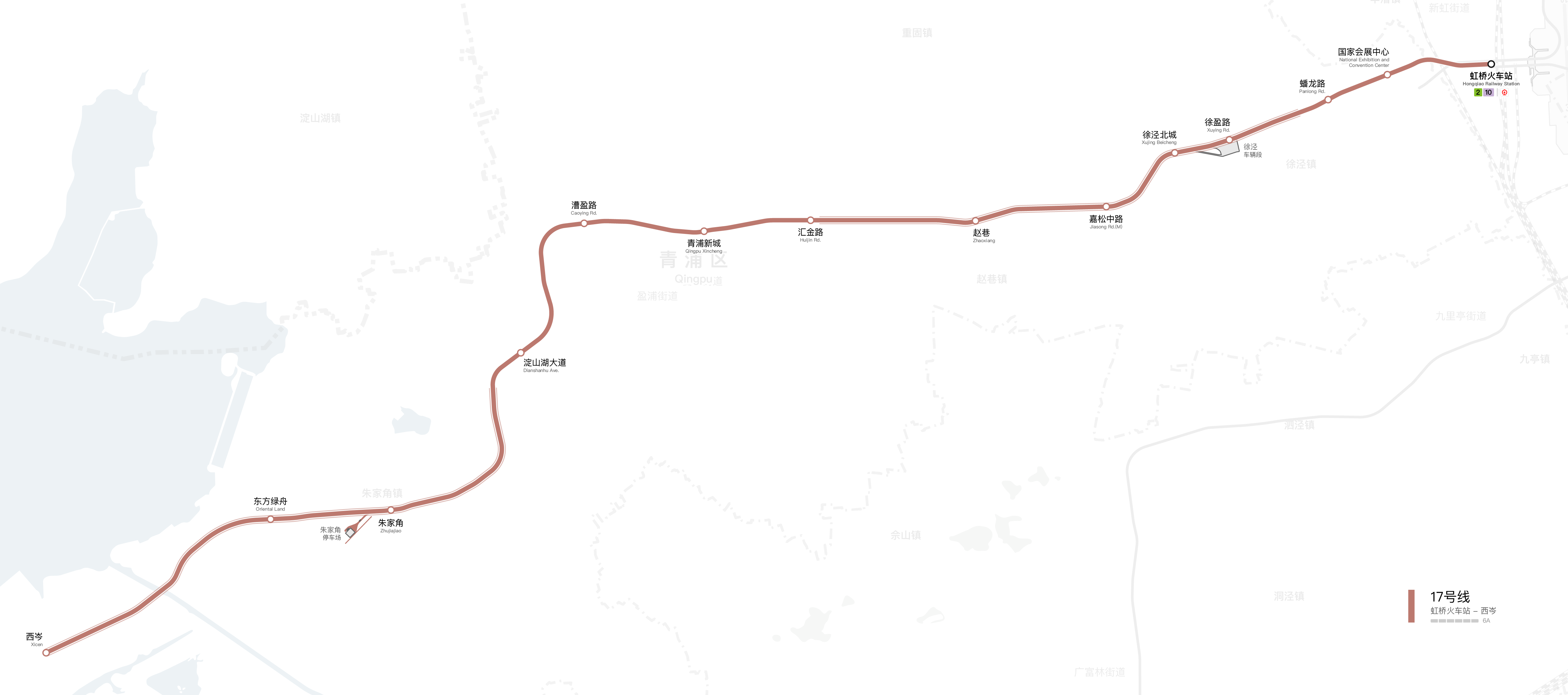

Line 17 of the Shanghai Metro (simplified Chinese: 上海轨道交通17号线; traditional Chinese: 上海軌道交通17號線), formerly known as the Qingpu line (青浦线; 青浦線), is an east–west rapid transit line that runs between Hongqiao Railway Station in Minhang District and Xicen in Qingpu District. All stations are fully accessible. It is 41.6 kilometres (25.8 mi) in length with 14 stations. The line entered passenger trial operations on 30 December 2017.

It is the first metro line to primarily service the suburban Qingpu District. Metro service arrived in Qingpu in 2010 with the opening of East Xujing, the western terminus of line 2. However, this station only services an area adjacent to the district's eastern border with Minhang. Line 17 is known for its artistic elements embedded into its stations. Due to the proximity of the line to various cultural and scenic attractions, specifically the ancient water town of Zhujiajiao and Dianshan Lake, the line's theme is water towns and headstreams of Shanghai. The line is colored light brown on system maps.

The line is the second line in Shanghai to use Shanghainese to announce stations. It is operated by Shanghai No. 2 Metro Operation Co. Ltd. (simplified Chinese: 上海地铁二运营有限公司; traditional Chinese: 上海地鐵二運營有限公司).

== History ==
During the line's planning stages, it was initially envisioned as a western extension of Line 2 and designated R2w. It also briefly took the designation of Line 20 before being officially renumbered to its current designation. Construction began in 2014 and track-laying was completed on 12 May 2017. The line debuted on 30 December 2017, when it opened for "soft" passenger trial operation.

Shanghai Metro Line 17 opening history
Segment	Commenced	Opened	Length	Station(s)	Name	Investment
Hongqiao Railway Station — Oriental Land	12 May 2016	30 Dec 2017	35.3 km (21.9 mi)	13	Initial phase	¥17.362 billion
Oriental Land - Xicen	28 Jun 2021	30 Nov 2024	6.6 km (4.1 mi)	1	West extension	¥

== Stations ==
=== Service routes ===
Shanghai Metro Line 17 service routes
M - Mainline: Hongqiao Railway Station ↔ Oriental Land; P - Partial Mainline: Hongqiao Railway Station ↔ Dianshanhu Avenue
Routes		Station name		Connections	Distance			Location	Open- ing	Plat- form
M	P	English	Chinese	Connections	km		min	Location	Open- ing	Plat- form
●	●	Hongqiao Railway Station	虹桥火车站	2 10; Airport Link (via Hongqiao Airport Terminal 2); AOH	0.00	0.00	0	Minhang	30 Dec 2017	Underground Two Island (shared 2 )
●	●	National Exhibition and Convention Center (Note: Was Zhuguang Road (诸光路))	国家会展中心	2 13 (Note: The station name of line 2 was East Xujing (徐泾东). Although it's de facto defined as out-of-system transfer station, virtual transfer via cards isn't available until open of the station of line 13 western extension, which is currently under construction, but after that day, the in-system transfer will be implemented instead.)	2.52	2.52	3	Qingpu	30 Dec 2017	Underground Island
●	●	Panlong Road	蟠龙路		1.50	4.02	6	Qingpu	30 Dec 2017	Underground Island
●	●	Xuying Road	徐盈路		2.53	6.55	9	Qingpu	30 Dec 2017	Elevated Island
●	●	Xujingbeicheng	徐泾北城		1.20	7.75	11	Qingpu	30 Dec 2017	Elevated Island
●	●	Middle Jiasong Road	嘉松中路		2.24	9.99	14	Qingpu	30 Dec 2017	Elevated Side
●	●	Zhaoxiang	赵巷		3.05	13.04	17	Qingpu	30 Dec 2017	Elevated Side
●	●	Huijin Road	汇金路		3.88	16.92	21	Qingpu	30 Dec 2017	Underground Side
●	●	Qingpu Xincheng	青浦新城		2.51	19.43	24	Qingpu	30 Dec 2017	Underground Island
●	●	Caoying Road	漕盈路		2.81	22.24	27	Qingpu	30 Dec 2017	Underground Island
●	●	Dianshanhu Avenue	淀山湖大道		3.85	26.09	31	Qingpu	30 Dec 2017	Underground Island
●		Zhujiajiao	朱家角		5.83	31.92	37	Qingpu	30 Dec 2017	Elevated Island
●		Oriental Land	东方绿舟		2.80	34.72	40	Qingpu	30 Dec 2017	Elevated Island
●		Xicen	西岑		6.6	41.32		Qingpu	30 Nov 2024	Elevated Island

=== Important stations ===
Line 17 begins in Minhang District at Hongqiao Railway Station, which lies adjacent to the border with Qingpu District. The line then crosses into Qingpu District and traverses the length of the suburban district from east to west. It runs underground beneath Songze Avenue from Hongqiao Railway Station to just west of Panlong Road, where it continues on an elevated section, running on the south side of the road. West of Xujingbeicheng, the line leaves Songze Avenue and curves to the southwest, lining up again on an east–west route beside East Yinggang Road just before reaching Middle Jiasong Road. West of Zhaoxiang, the line again enters an underground section until just west of Dianshanhu Avenue. In this underground section, the tracks follow East Yinggang Road westward, before curving south under Caoying Road, and then southwest again beneath Dianshanhu Avenue. The remaining section of the line to the western terminus at Xicen is elevated and parallels the G50 Huyu Expressway.There are a total of 14 stations, 7 elevated and 7 underground; the length of the line is 41.6 kilometres (25.8 mi).

Hongqiao Railway Station, the eastern terminus of the line, is the only station that provides an interchange to other lines in the network. At the station, passengers can interchange to lines 2 and 10 without leaving the fare-paid zone. A cross-platform interchange is provided for passengers between line 2 and line 17. Eastbound passengers on line 17 arriving at Hongqiao Railway Station can simply stay on the same platform, crossing the other side, to change to an eastbound line 2 train. Similarly, westbound passengers bound for National Exhibition and Convention Center coming from line 2 can transfer to Line 17 by crossing to the other side of the platform. Transfers between line 10 and Line 17 require passengers to ascend to the station concourse and change platforms. The station is also directly connected to Hongqiao Railway Station, which provides inter-city high-speed travel to destinations throughout China.

=== Future Expansion ===
==== West extension to Xicen ====
An extension of one station to Xicen was drafted in December 2020. It will follow Qingping highway then G50 Shanghai–Chongqing Expressway. Construction started on 28 June 2021.

The west extension project of Line 17 will run from Oriental Land station (excluding) to Xicen Station, with a total length of about 6.6 kilometers, which will promote the Cenke Innovation Center. The extension project was completed with the opening of Xicen Station on 30 November 2024.

==== Extension beyond Xicen ====
The first phase of the western extension of the line will be further expanded 13 kilometers to Xicen and Jinze towns, both with an abundance of lakes, wetlands and typical sceneries of watertowns in the southern areas of the Yangtze River Delta.

In the long term, Shanghai metro line 17 will in the future connect with line 10 of Suzhou Metro. Line 10 is expected to extend to Shuixiangketing Station, passing through Lili, and planning Jiaxing North Station within Jiashan Track branch to Xitang Station. The extension line of Suzhou Metro line 10 starts from the planned Suzhou South Station, passes through Lili Station, and ends at Shuixiangketing Station.

The planning suggests that Shanghai Line 17 extend to Jiashan South Station, passing through important nodes such as Jiashan Station, Xitang Station, and Shuixiangketing station. According to the publicized rail network layout plan, the extension of Shanghai Metro Line 17 departs from Shanghai Metro Oriental Land station, along with Dianshan Lake Station, Shuixiangketing Station, Beixiang Fudang Station, Xitang Station, Yaozhuang Station, and Tan Gongbei Road Station, Jiashan Station, Jiashan Stadium Station, High-speed Railway Xincheng Station, Jiashan South Station have 10 stations, connecting Pinghu in the long term.

Future link with Jiaxing Metro Line 3 is also under consideration.

==== Extension beyond Hongqiao Railway Station ====
Changning District government has proposed plans to extend Line 17 to the Changning District.

== Headways ==
Shanghai Metro Line 17 headway
Time		Oriental Land - Dianshanhu Avenue	Dianshanhu Avenue - Hongqiao Railway Station
Monday - Friday (Working Days)
AM peak	6:30–9:30	About 7 min	About 3 min and 30 sec
Off-peak	9:30–17:00	About 10 min
PM peak	17:00–20:00	About 8 min	About 4 min
Other hours	Before 6:30 After 20:00	4 – 10 min
Saturday and Sunday (Weekends)
Peak	7:30–20:00	About 7 min
Other hours	Before 7:30 After 20:00	8 - 10 min

== Technology ==
=== Signaling ===
CASCO TRANAVI GoA3

=== Rolling stock ===
Line 17 uses 38 6-carriages A-class trains built by Changchun Railway Vehicles or Shanghai Electric. Unlike most Shanghai Metro lines, this line is operated using third rail electrification. The trains have an operating speed of 100 km/h (62 mph). Trains are stored at Xujing depot, located between Xuying Road and Xujingbeicheng, as well as Zhujiajiao yard, just west of Zhujiajiao. Trains have a capacity of about 1,860 people.

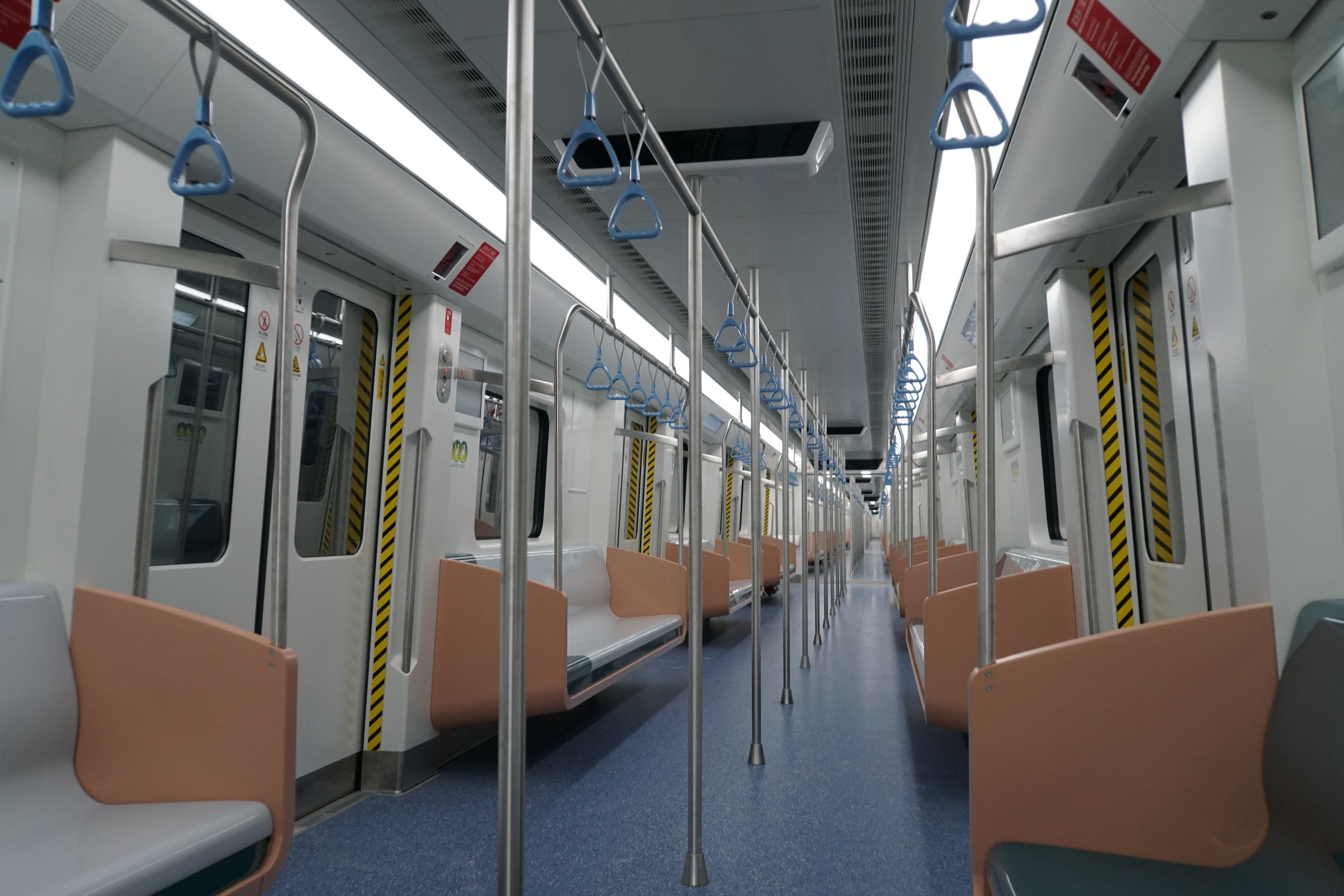
17A01 train interior

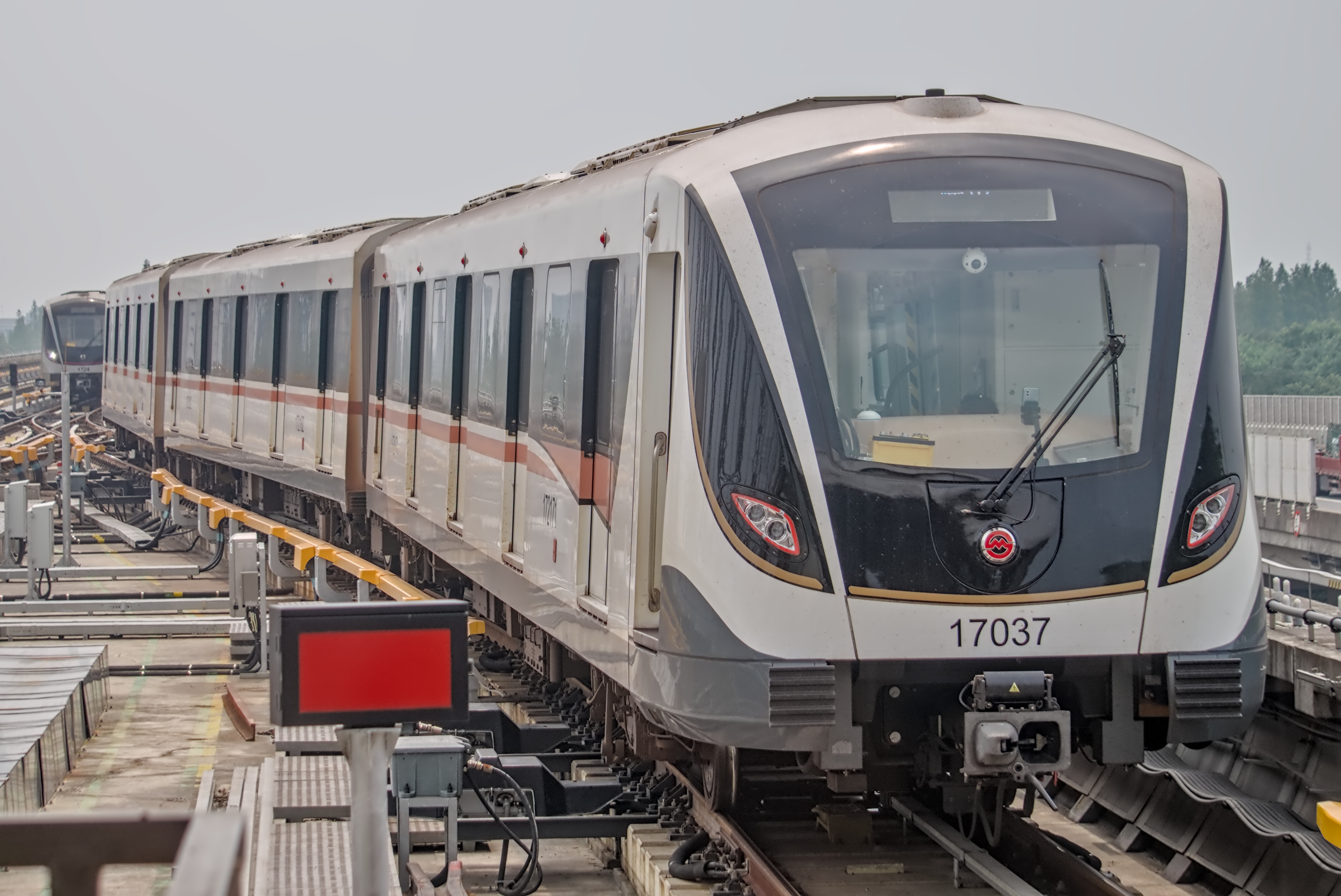
17A02 train
