= Dianshan Lake =

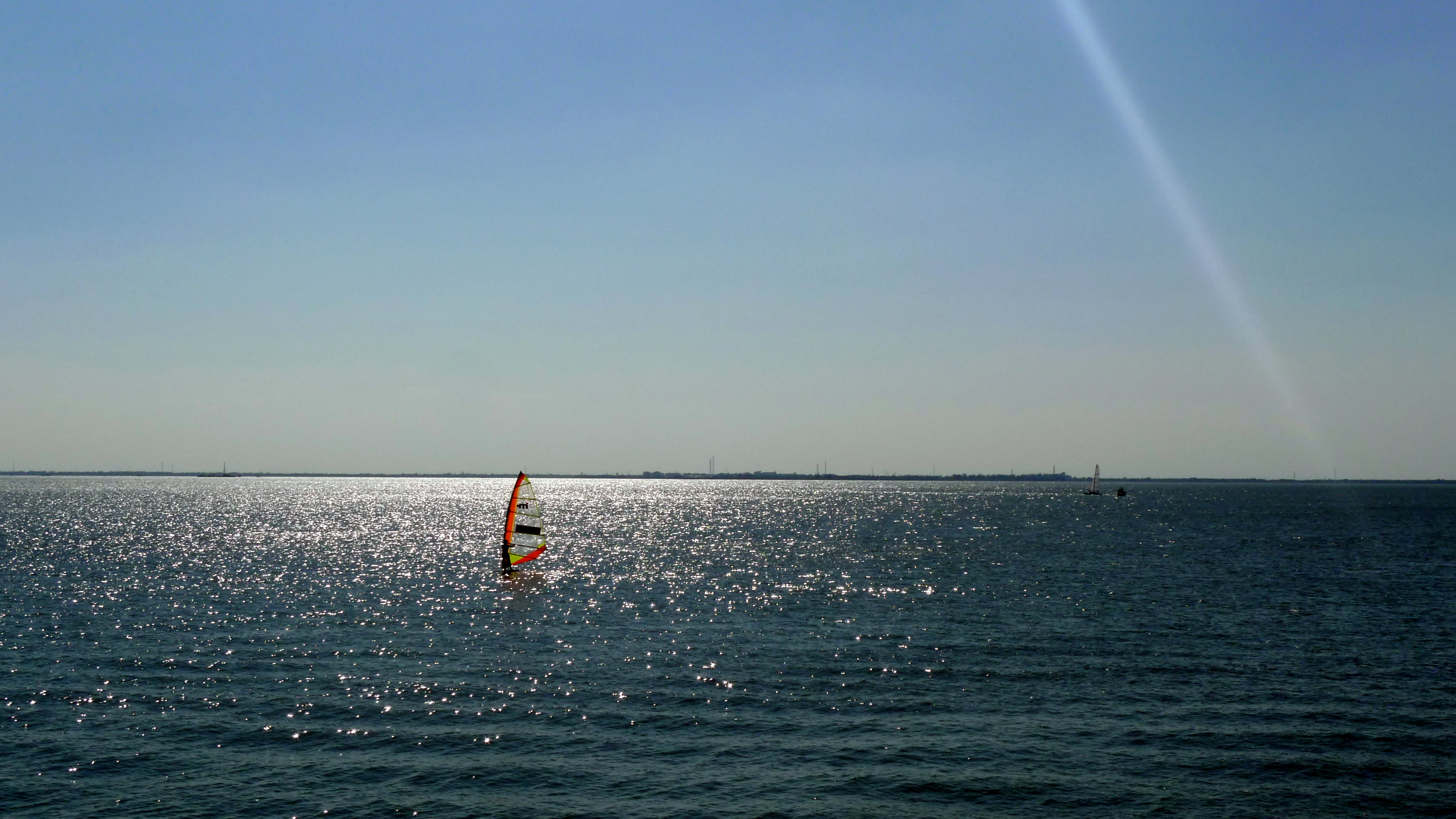
- Dianshan Lake

- Location within Shanghai
- Location: Shanghai
- Coordinates: 31.12°N 120.971°E
- Type: freshwater lake
- Primary outflows: Huangpu River
- Basin countries: China
- Surface area: 62 square kilometers (23.9 sq mi)

Dianshan Lake (simplified Chinese: 淀山湖; traditional Chinese: 澱山湖; pinyin: Diànshān Hú) is a freshwater lake west of Zhujiajiao, Qingpu District, in Shanghai, China. Measuring 62 square kilometers (23.9 sq mi), it is the largest freshwater lake in Shanghai and the upstream of the Huangpu River.

The Shanghai Water Sports Centre was supposed to be the venue for the 2021 World Rowing Championships, but the event was cancelled due to COVID-19 pandemic. It was the venue for the World Rowing Championships in September 2025.

== Transportation ==
Oriental Land station of Shanghai's Line 17 serves the eastern side of the lake. A number of public transport buses and taxis are available.
