= National Exhibition and Convention Center station =

Interchange station of Shanghai metro

National Exhibition and Convention Center 国家会展中心
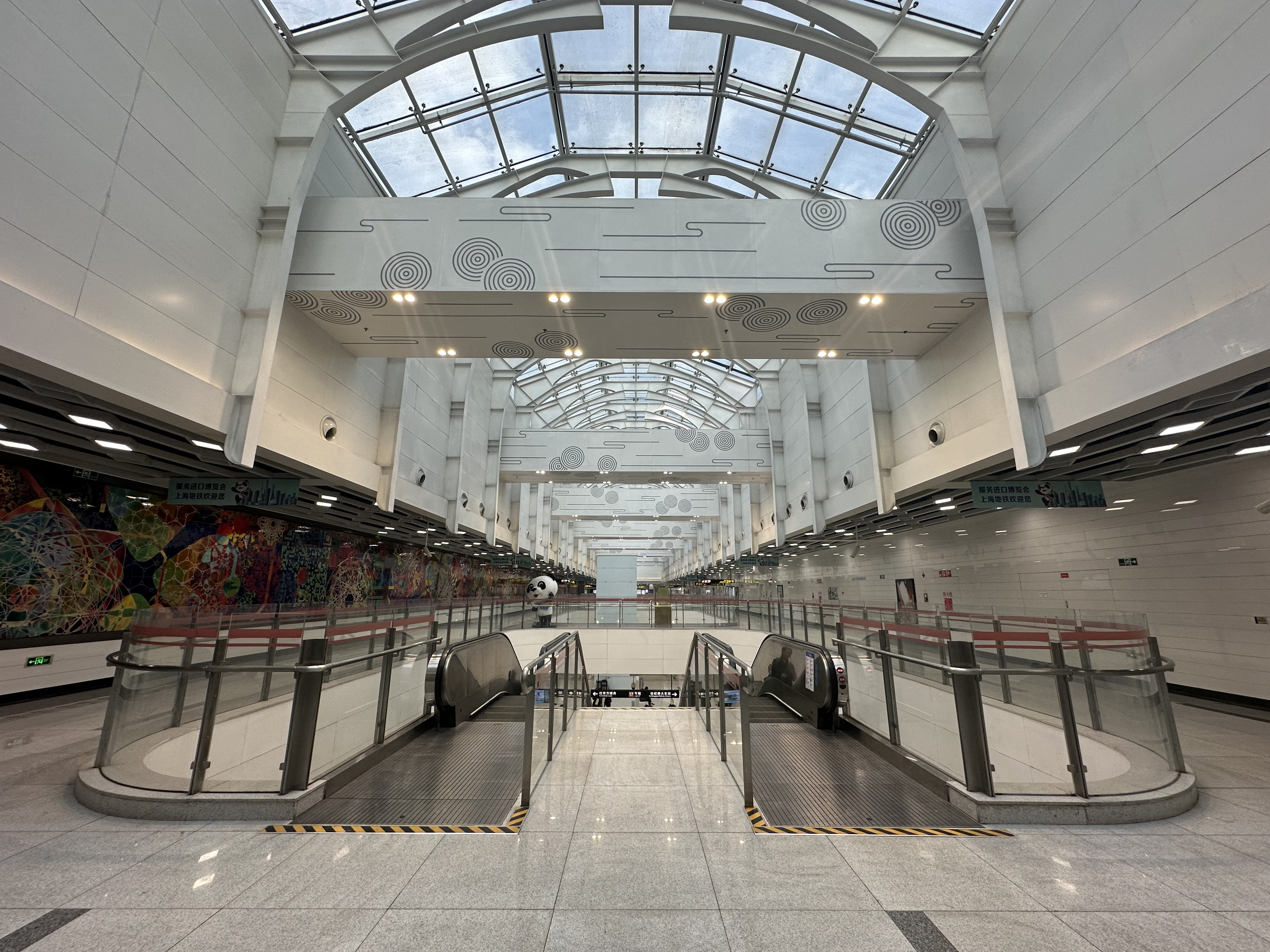
- Concourse of the Line 17 station

Chinese name
- Simplified Chinese: 国家会展中心
- Traditional Chinese: 國家會展中心
Transcriptions
Standard Mandarin
- Hanyu Pinyin: Guójiā huìzhǎn zhōngxīn

General information
- Other names: China Exposition North (Line 17 planning name); East Xujing (Line 2 former name); Zhuguang Road (Line 17 former name)
- Location: Qingpu District, Shanghai; China
- Coordinates: 31.190556°N 121.295278°E
- Operator: Shanghai No. 2 Metro Operation Co. Ltd.
- Lines: Line 2; Line 17
- Platforms: 4 (2 island platforms)
- Tracks: 4

Construction
- Structure type: Underground
- Accessible: Yes

History
- Opened: 16 March 2010; 16 years ago (Line 2); 30 December 2017; 8 years ago (Line 17)

Services
| Preceding station | Shanghai Metro | Following station |
|---|---|---|
| Panxiang Road · Shanghai National Accounting Institute Terminus | Line 2 | Hongqiao Railway Station towards Pudong Airport Terminal 1&2 |
| Panlong Road towards Xicen | Line 17 | Hongqiao Railway Station Terminus |
Future services
| Terminus | Line 13 | Yunle Road towards Dangui Road |
Location
- Location within Shanghai

National Exhibition and Convention Center (Chinese: 国家会展中心; pinyin: Guójiā Huìzhǎn Zhōngxīn) is a station on Line 2 and Line 17 of the Shanghai Metro, located at the Shanghai National Exhibition and Convention Center. The station opened on 16 March 2010 as East Xujing (Chinese: 徐泾东) on Line 2, and on 30 December 2017 as Zhuguang Road (Chinese: 诸光路) on Line 17. Both stations were merged on 21 September 2024. Because of this station's proximity to its namesake, large crowds often appear when expos such as the China International Import Expo are held there. The station is located in Xujing Town, Qingpu District, Shanghai.

== History ==
=== Line 2 ===
On 16 March 2010, Line 2's Xujing East Station commenced operations. In November 2019, Exits 4 and 5 of the station resumed operation following the completion of the National Exhibition and Convention Centre. Located within it, these exits provide the most convenient access to the West Arrival Hall. From 23 January to 2 February 2020, service between Xujing East Station and Songhong Road Station on Line 2 were suspended due to tunnel refurbishment works in both directions. On 1 April 2022, in response to the COVID-19 pandemic prevention and control measures, the station suspended services, until 4 July, when operations resumed. From 22 to 27 January 2023, services at Xujing East Station and Songhong Road Station were suspended due to construction works between the two stations.。

=== Line 17 ===
The Line 17 station opened for passenger trials on 30 December 2017, alongside the rest of the first section of the line. During the planning and construction stages, the station was named China Exposition North (simplified Chinese: 中国博览会北; traditional Chinese: 中國博覽會北; pinyin: Zhōngguó Bólǎnhuì běi), because it is located north of the National Convention and Exhibition Center.

== Station description ==
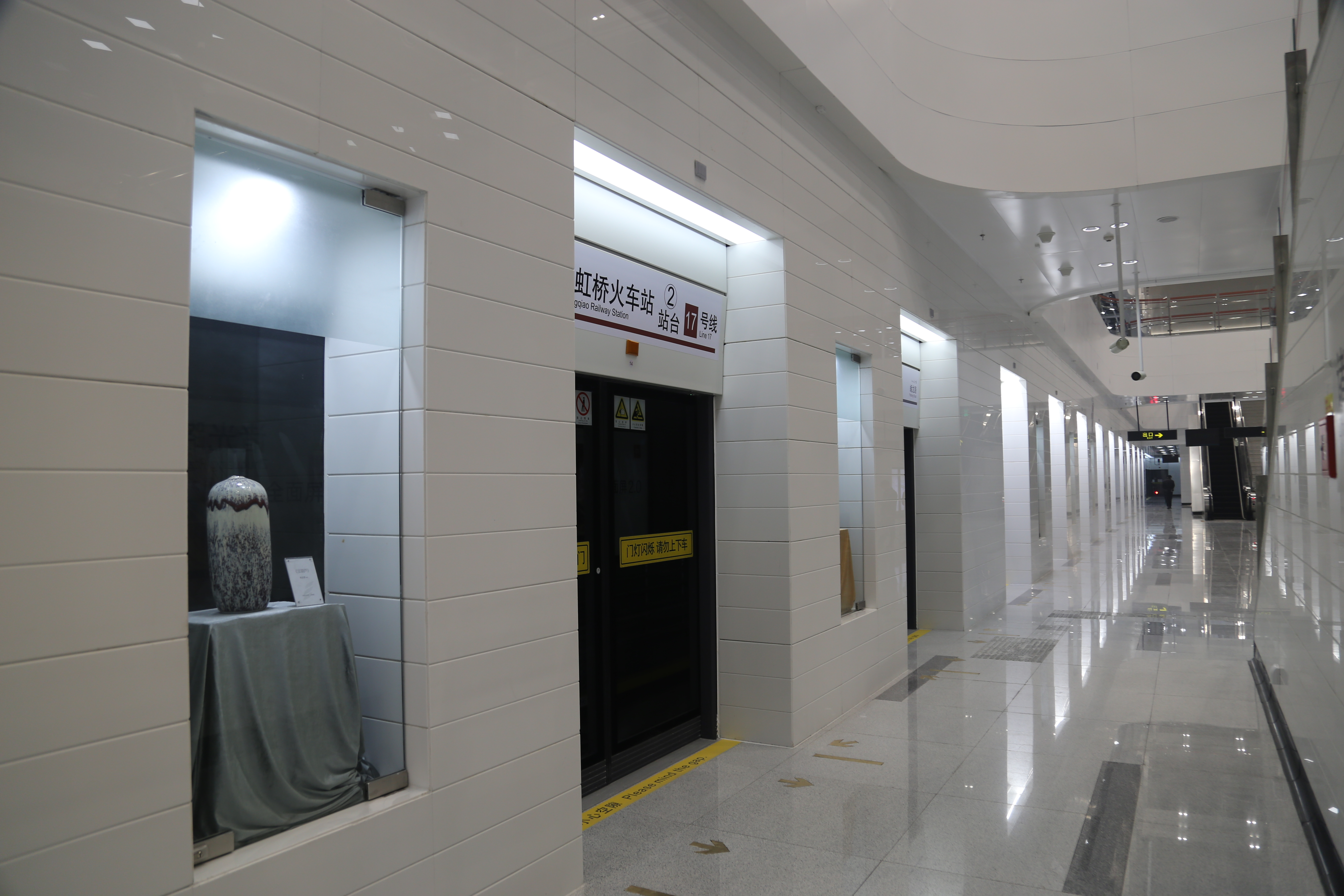
Porcelain art on display at platform level

This station will become a terminus for Line 13, which opens in 2027.

=== Line 2 ===
The Line 2 station concourse is located on the first underground level and is arranged in an east-west direction. The paid area is located in the centre of the concourse, with entrance turnstiles on the north side and exit turnstiles on the south side. A long passageway is located to the west of the concourse, leading to exits 6, 8, and 9.

=== Line 17 ===
Like all stations on Line 17, National Exhibition and Convention Center station is fully accessible. The platform area consists of a single island platform located underground, beneath a concourse level, which has two service counters, one at each end. There are fare controls at both the west and east ends of the concourse level. The platform area can be accessed by elevator from the concourse area within the fare-paid zone. The street level and concourse level are connected by an elevator near Exit 3, at the western end of the station. Toilets are located at the platform level within the fare-paid zone, at the east end of the platform.

The station itself is located in the eastern part of Qingpu District, beneath the Songze Elevated Road along Songze Avenue, between Zhuguang Road and Panxiu Road. The station is located very close to the boundary with Minhang District.

The Line 17 station is known for its design elements. An 88-metre (289 ft) long mural fills the entire length of the concourse. Although an underground station, sunshine flows easily to the platform level via a panoramic sunroof, which covers the entire ceiling. The single island platform is 23 metres (75 ft) wide, and unlike other island platforms, there are no support columns along the middle of the platform. These columns were instead placed between the platform and the tracks, also serving as pilasters for the platform screen doors. Porcelain art pieces are on display between the platform screen doors.

In July 2018 the Line 17 station won the LEED (Leadership in Energy and Environmental Design) silver prize, the most widely used green building rating system in the world, making it the first of all Metro stations in Asia to win the title.

=== Exits ===
This station has 11 exits. As the two lines that currently stop here have separate concourses, each exit leads to a single line. Exits 2-6, 8-9, and 13-14 (formerly East Xujing Station) lead to Line 2, while exits 15-16 (formerly exits 2 and 3 of Zhuguang Road Station) lead to Line 17. Originally, the Line 2 station had four additional exits, numbered 1, 2, 14 and 15. These were demolished after the construction of the National Exhibition and Convention Center and rebuilt as the current Exits 2 and 14. The accessible lift at the former exit 15 has been retained but is currently not open to the public.

Line 2

- Exit 2: Shanghai National Exhibition and Convention Center Complex, Commercial Plaza, Office Blocks B & C
- Exit 3: Shanghai National Exhibition and Convention Center Complex, Commercial Plaza, Office Blocks B & C
- Exit 4: Shanghai National Exhibition and Convention Center Complex, Office Block A
- Exit 5: Shanghai National Exhibition and Convention Center Complex, Office Block A
- Exit 6: Zhuguang Road, East Xumin Road, Shanghai National Exhibition and Convention Center Complex
- Exit 8: East Xumin Road
- Exit 9: East Xumin Road, Zhuguang Road
- Exit 13: Shanghai National Exhibition and Convention Center Complex, Commercial Plaza, Office Blocks B & C (not open)
- Exit 14: Shanghai National Exhibition and Convention Center Complex, Commercial Plaza, Office Blocks B & C (not open)

Line 17

- Exit 15: Zhuguang Road
- Exit 16: Panxiu Road

== Nearby landmarks ==
The station is located just northwest of the National Convention and Exhibition Center, which was the venue for the China International Import Expo in November 2018. Even though both the Line 2 and Line 17 stations share the same name, the station is currently not considered an interchange station. However this will change with the opening of the Line 13 extension in 2026. Passengers wishing to interchange to Line 2 from Line 17 can make their way to Hongqiao Railway Station, which is one stop to the east.

== Gallery ==
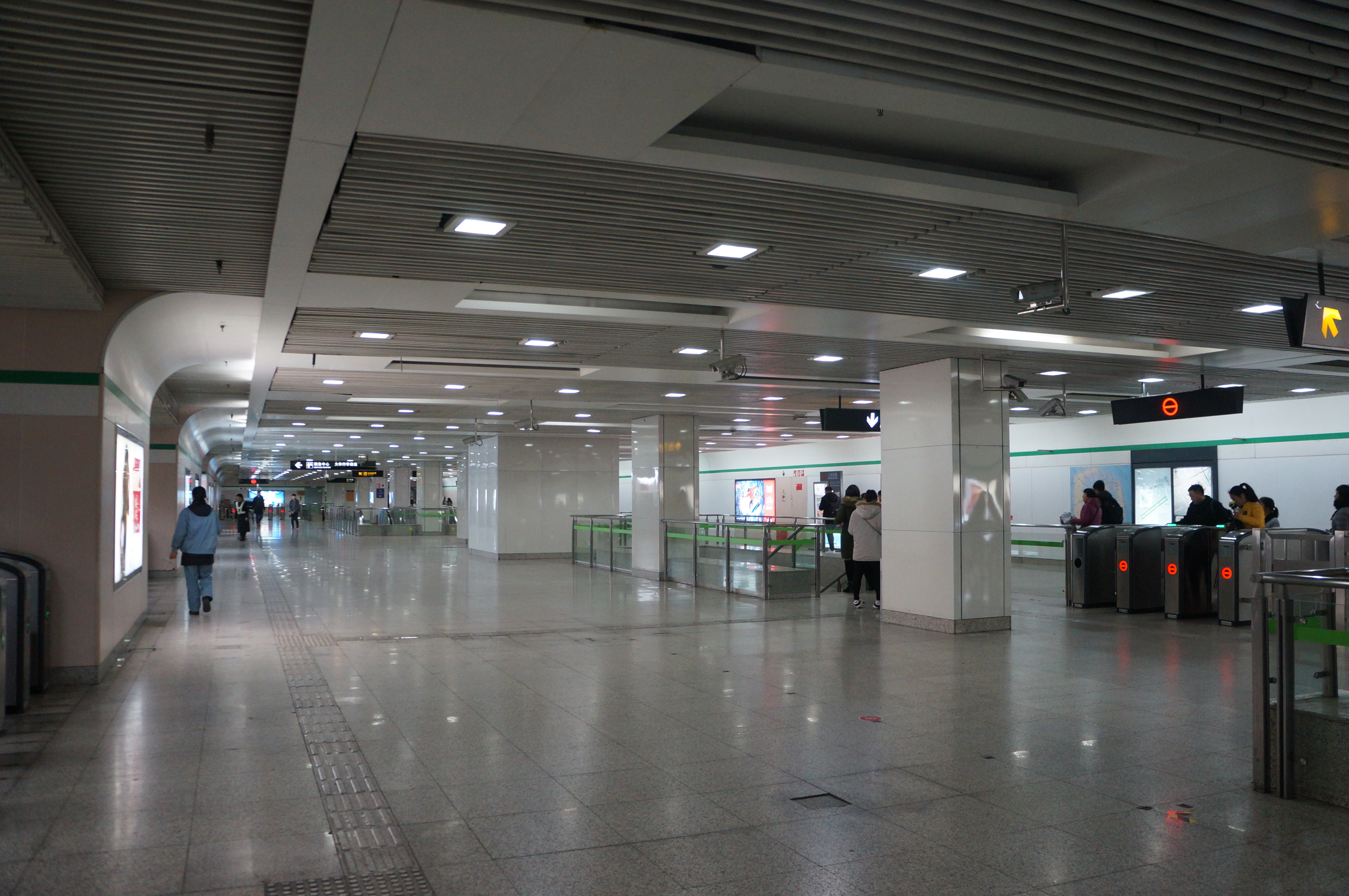
Line 2 concourse

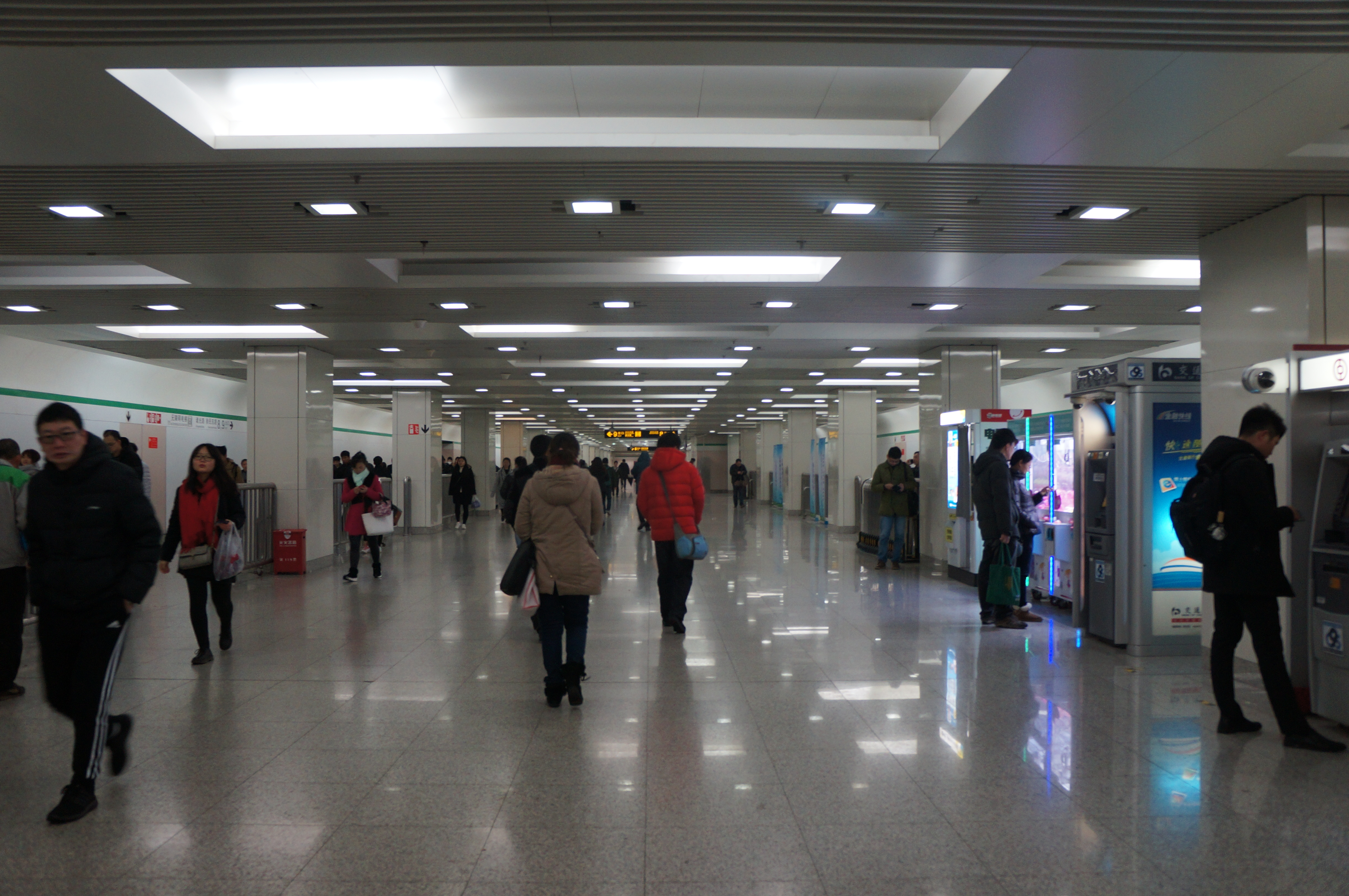
Line 2 passageway linking to Exits 6, 8 and 9

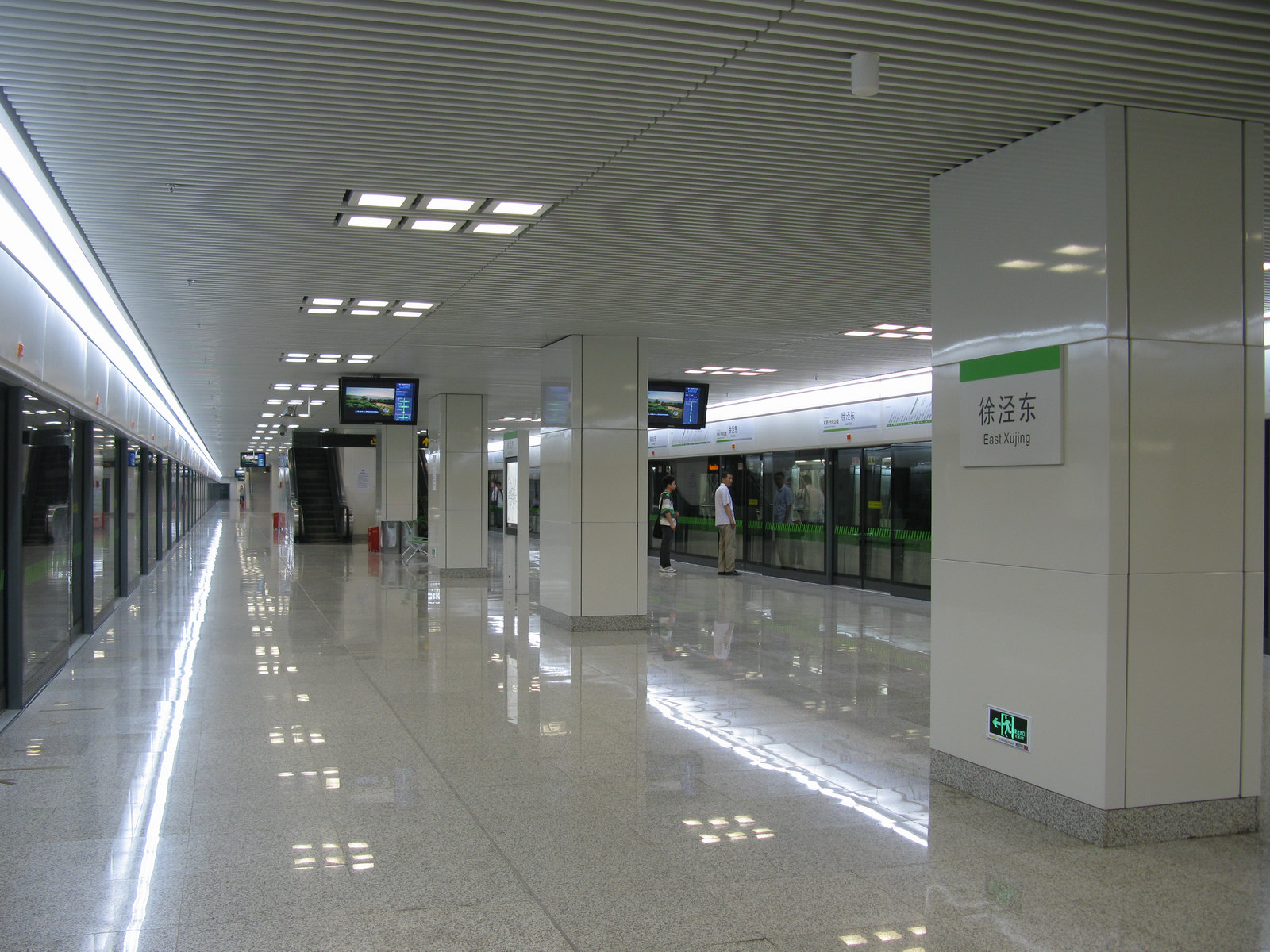
Line 2 platform (May 2010, as East Xujing)

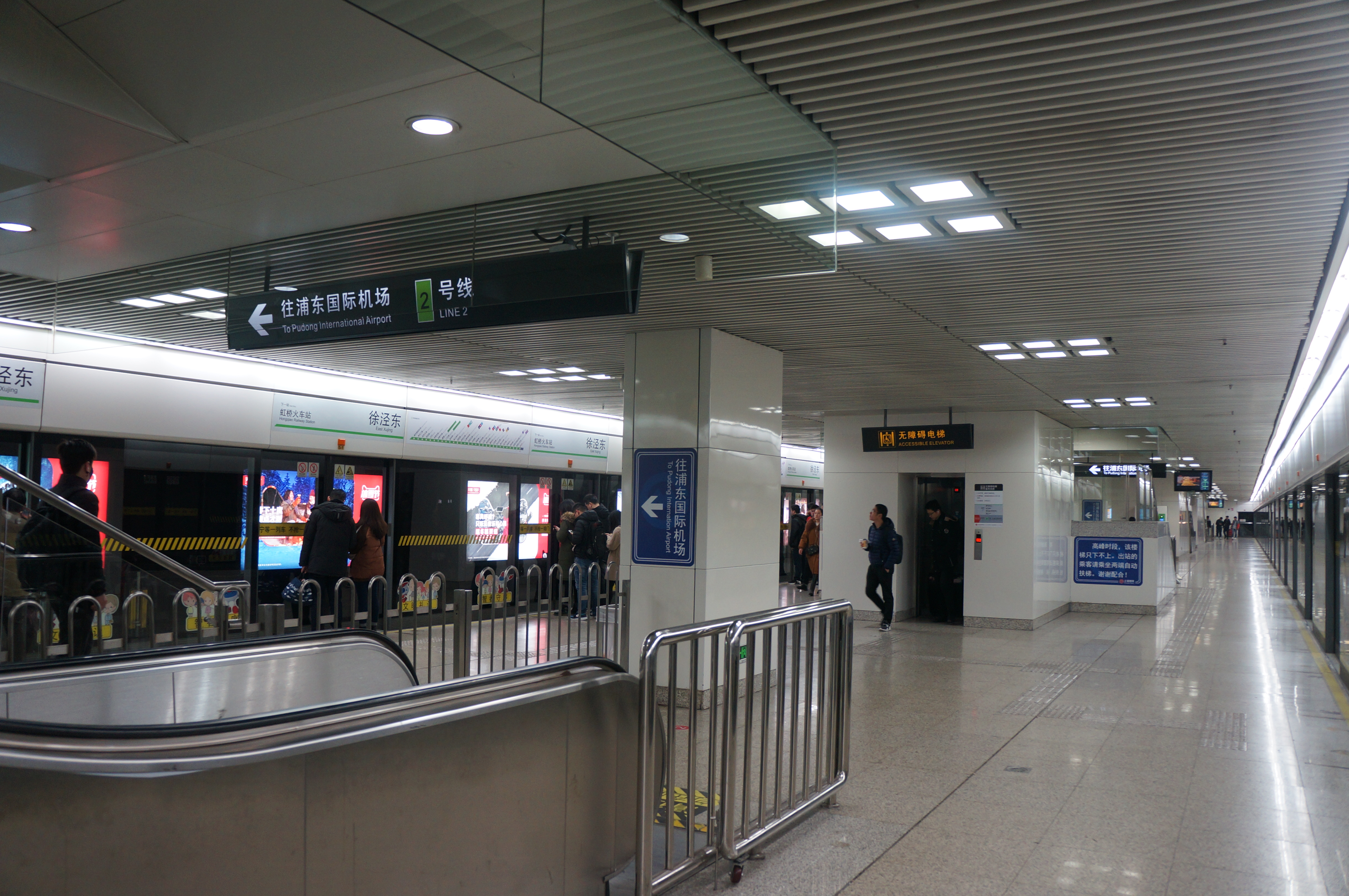
Line 2 platform (January 2018, as East Xujing)

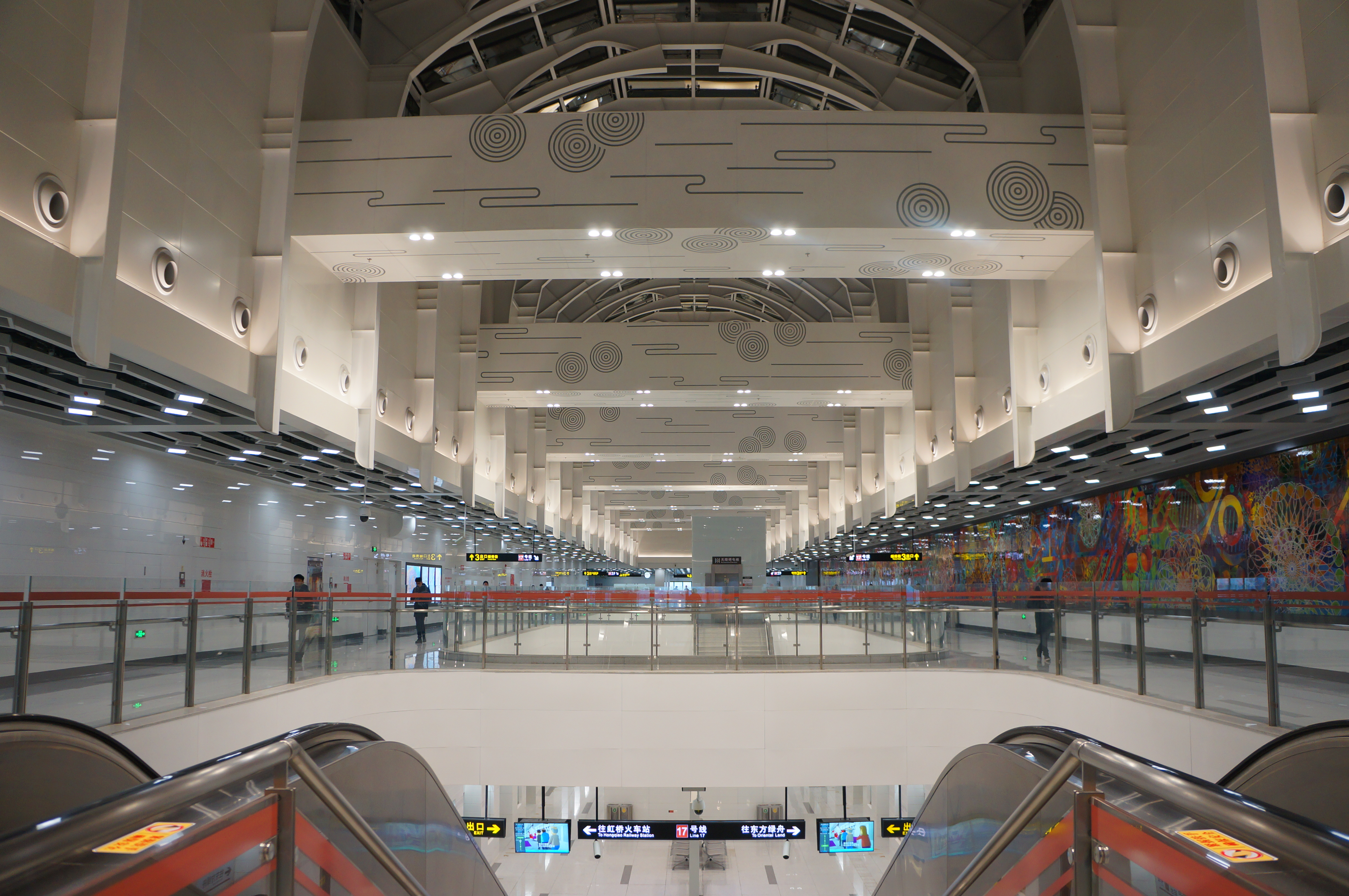
Line 17 concourse (opposite view)
