= National Exhibition and Convention Center (Shanghai) =

Convention center in Shanghai, China

National Exhibition and Convention Center (Shanghai) 国家会展中心（上海）
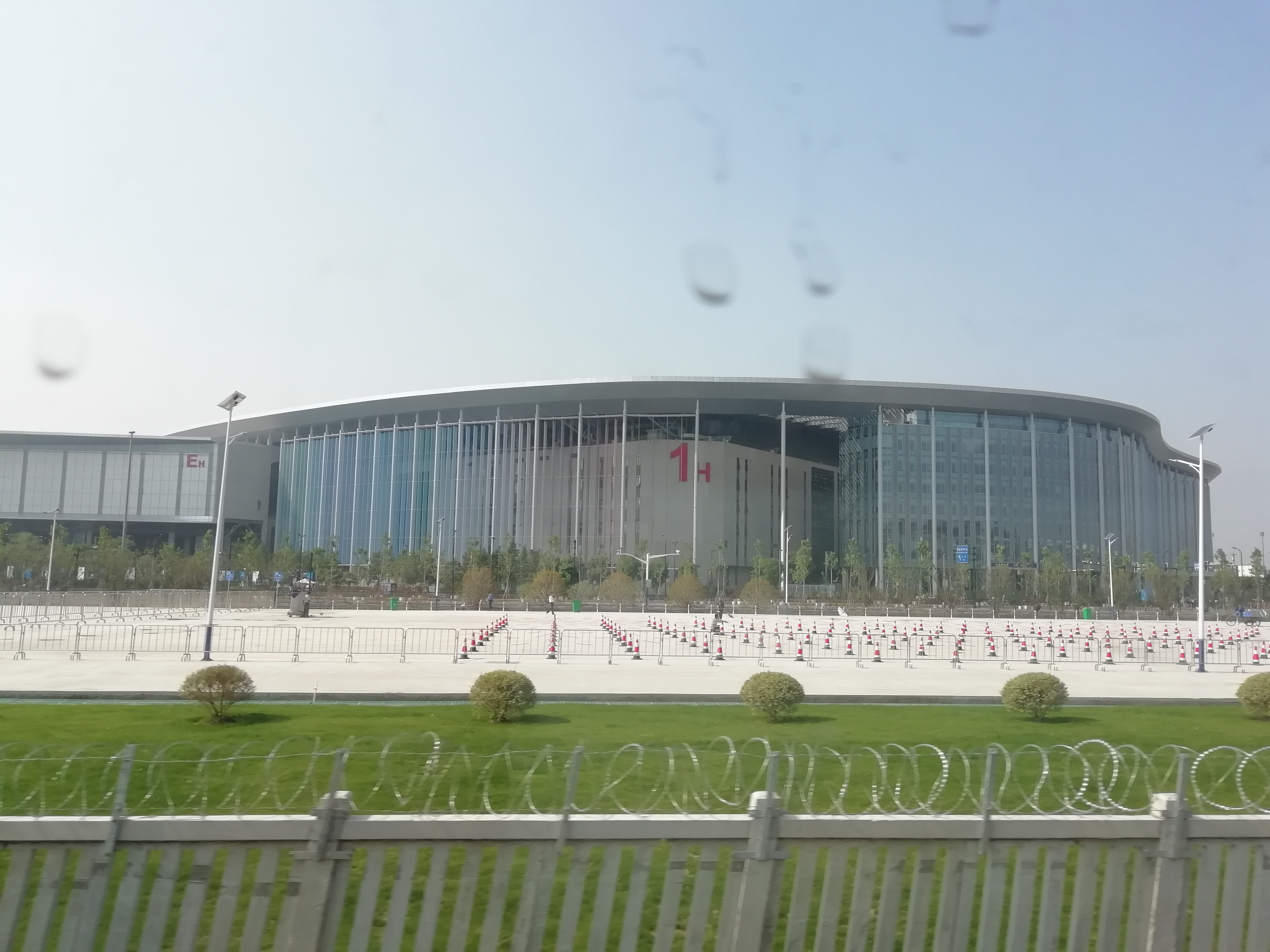
- Interactive map of National Exhibition and Convention Center (Shanghai) 国家会展中心（上海）
- Address: 168 East Yinggang Rd (South Gate); 333 Songze Avenue (North Gate); 111 Laigang Rd (East Gate); 1888 Zhuguang Rd (West Gate)
- Location: Shanghai, China
- Coordinates: 31°11′30″N 121°18′00″E
- Public transit: East Xujing station : Line 2; 706, 865

Construction
- Opened: 2015
- Cost: 16 billion Chinese yuan

Website
- www.neccsh.com/cecsh/

National Exhibition and Convention Center
- Traditional Chinese: 國家會展中心（上海）
- Simplified Chinese: 国家会展中心（上海）
- Literal meaning: National Exhibition And Convention Center (Shanghai)
Transcriptions
Standard Mandarin
- Hanyu Pinyin: Guójiā Huìzhǎn Zhōngxīn (Shànghǎi)

Alternative Chinese name
- Traditional Chinese: 虹館
- Simplified Chinese: 虹馆
- Literal meaning: (Exhibition) Hall in Hongqiao
Transcriptions
Standard Mandarin
- Hanyu Pinyin: Hóngguǎn

The National Exhibition and Convention Center (Shanghai) is an exhibition and convention center in Shanghai, China. The NECC is currently the largest exhibition complex, making it one of the landmark buildings in Shanghai. The building was co-built by Ministry of Commerce of China and Shanghai Municipal Government.

The center consists of four exhibition halls, the NECC Plaza, office buildings and a hotel. The façade of the NECC building draws inspiration from a "four-leaf clover" with the plaza as the core and the exhibition halls as its leaves.

Located in the Qingpu District in western Shanghai, the NECC enjoys multiple means of transportation provided by the Hongqiao transportation hub, including buses, metro, high-speed railway and airport. Metro Line 2's East Xujing station is the closest metro station to the center.

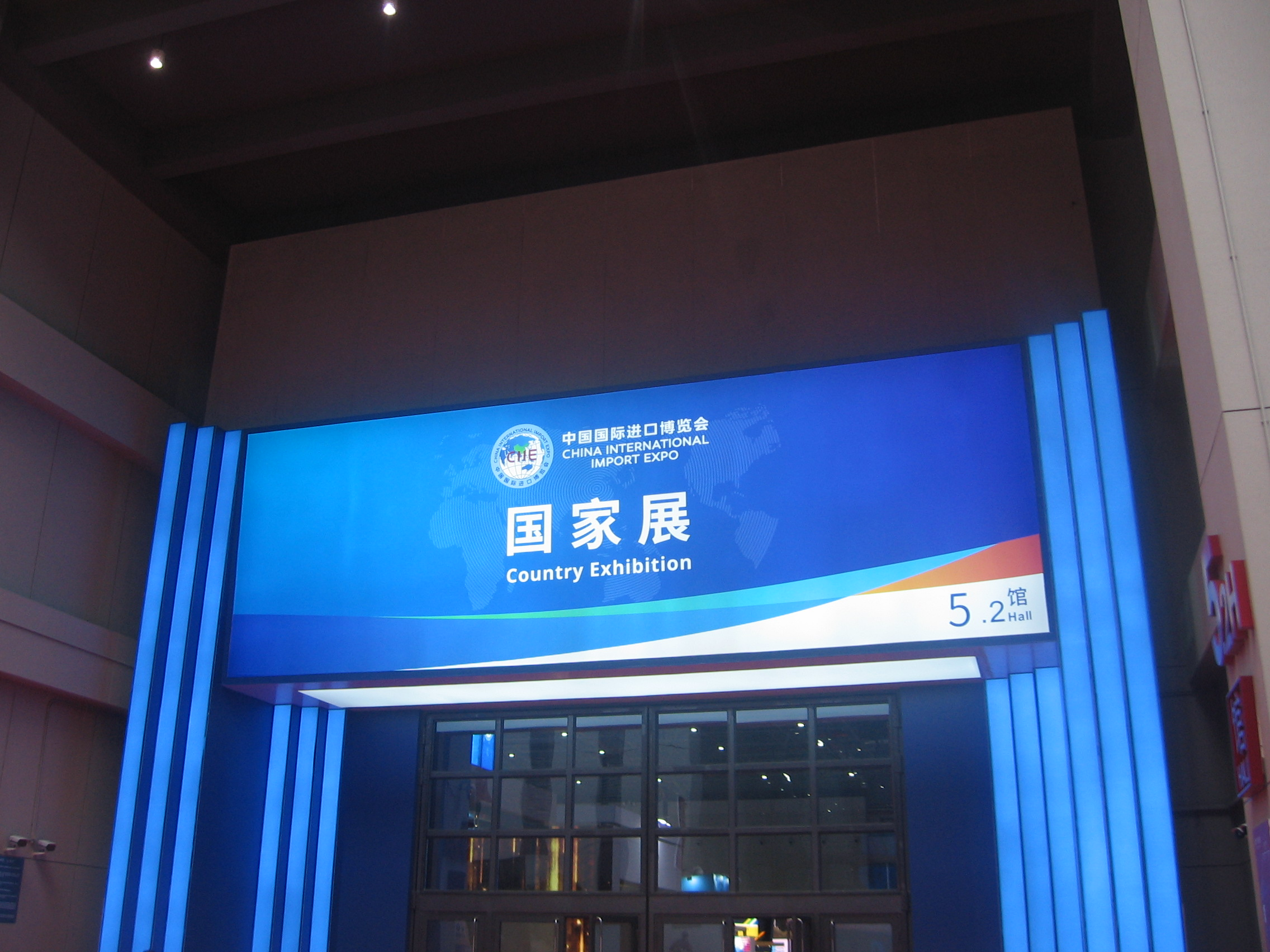
Country Exhibition at China International Import Expo

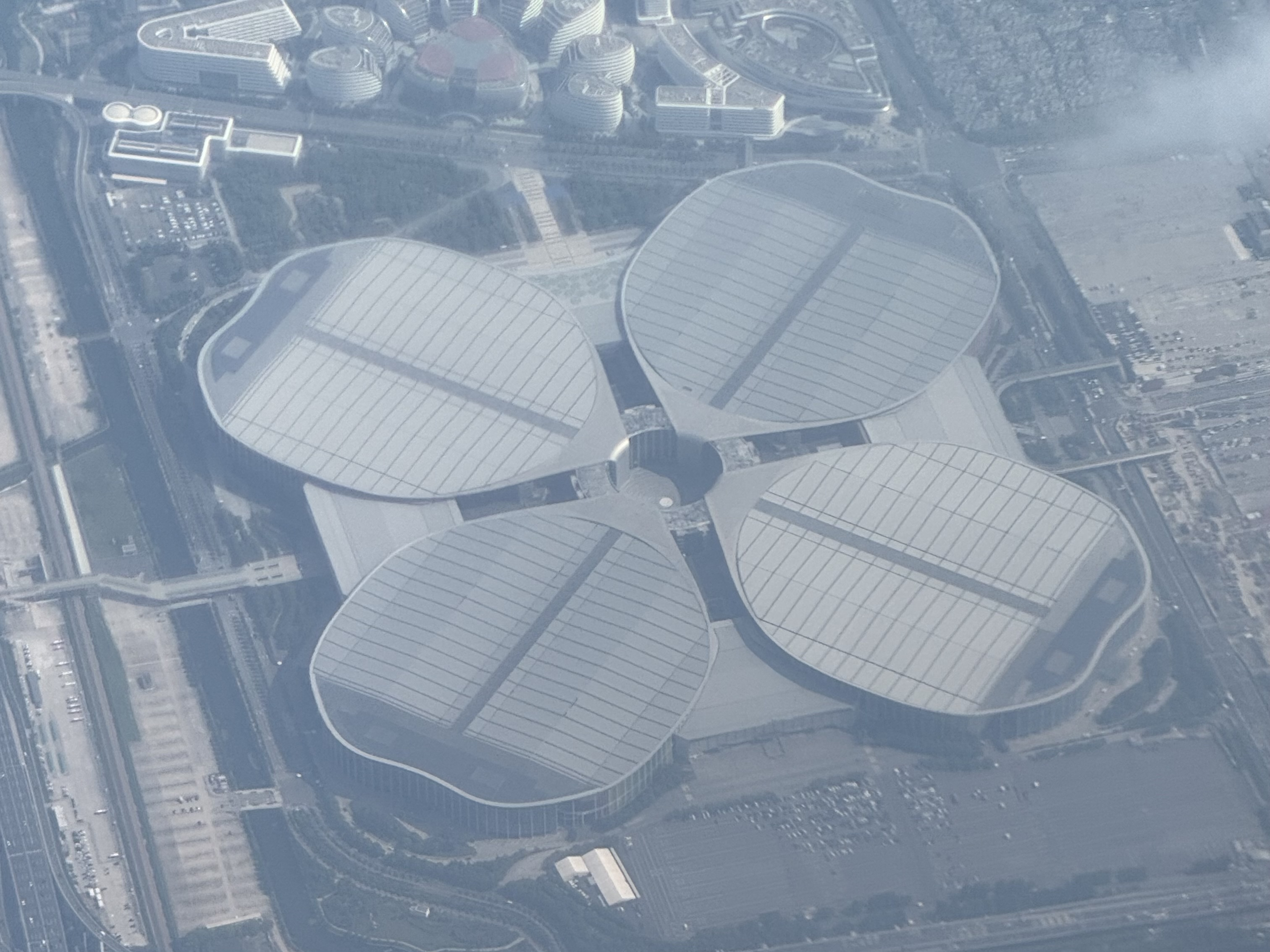
Aerial view of the NECC. The design draws inspiration from a four-leaf clover.

== Entertainment events ==
- 28 July 2018 – Kyary Pamyu Pamyu – The Spooky Obakeyashiki: Pumpkins Strike Back
- 2 February 2019 – Perfume – Perfume WORLD TOUR 4th "FUTURE POP"
- 18 June 2019 – Boyzone – Thank You & Goodnight Tour
- 22 June 2019 – Aimer – Aimer "soleil et pluie”Asia Tour
- 16 August 2019 – Westlife – The Twenty Tour
- 24 August 2019 – AKB48 Group – Asia Festival 2019 in Shanghai
- 23 November 2019 – Gen Hoshino – Pop Virus World Tour

== See also ==
- National Convention and Exhibition Center (Tianjin)
