= Oriental Land station =

Shanghai Metro station

Oriental Land 东方绿舟
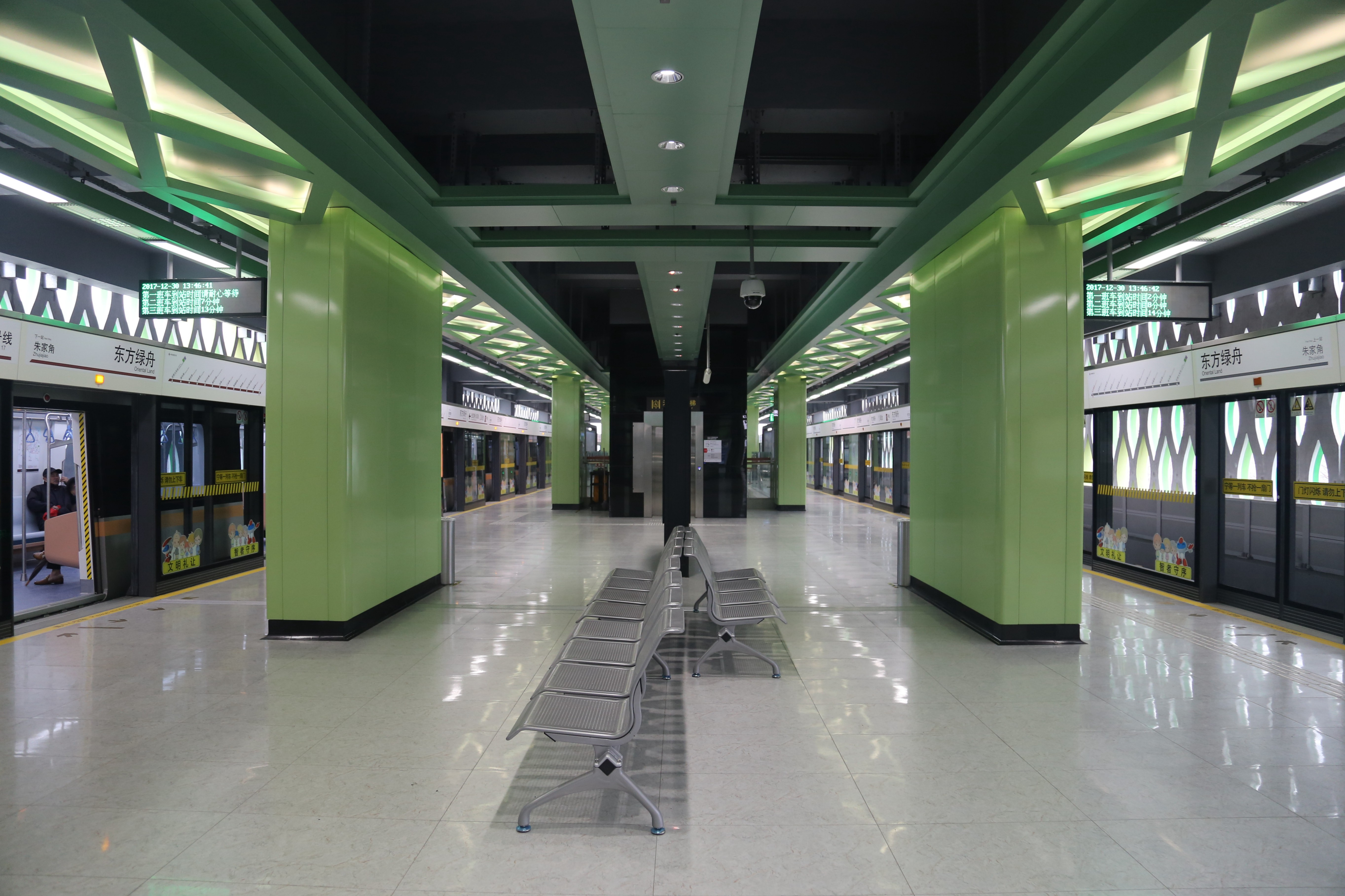
- Station platform

General information
- Location: Huqingping Highway and Xuejian Road, Qingpu District, Shanghai; China
- Coordinates: 31.100580°N 121.015133°E
- Operator: Shanghai No. 2 Metro Operation Co. Ltd.
- Line: Line 17
- Platforms: 2 (1 island platform)
- Tracks: 2

Construction
- Structure type: Elevated
- Accessible: Yes

History
- Opened: 30 December 2017; 8 years ago

Services
| Preceding station | Shanghai Metro | Following station |
|---|---|---|
| Xicen Terminus | Line 17 | Zhujiajiao towards Hongqiao Railway Station |
Location
- Location within Shanghai

Oriental Land (simplified Chinese: 东方绿舟; traditional Chinese: 東方綠舟; pinyin: Dōngfāng Lǜzhōu) is a station on Line 17 of the Shanghai Metro. Located at the intersection of Huqingping Highway and Xuejian Road, it was the western terminus of Line 17 until Xicen opened on 30 November 2024. The station opened with the rest of Line 17 on 30 December 2017.

== History ==
The station opened for passenger trial operation on 30 December 2017, concurrent with the opening of the rest of Line 17.

== Description ==
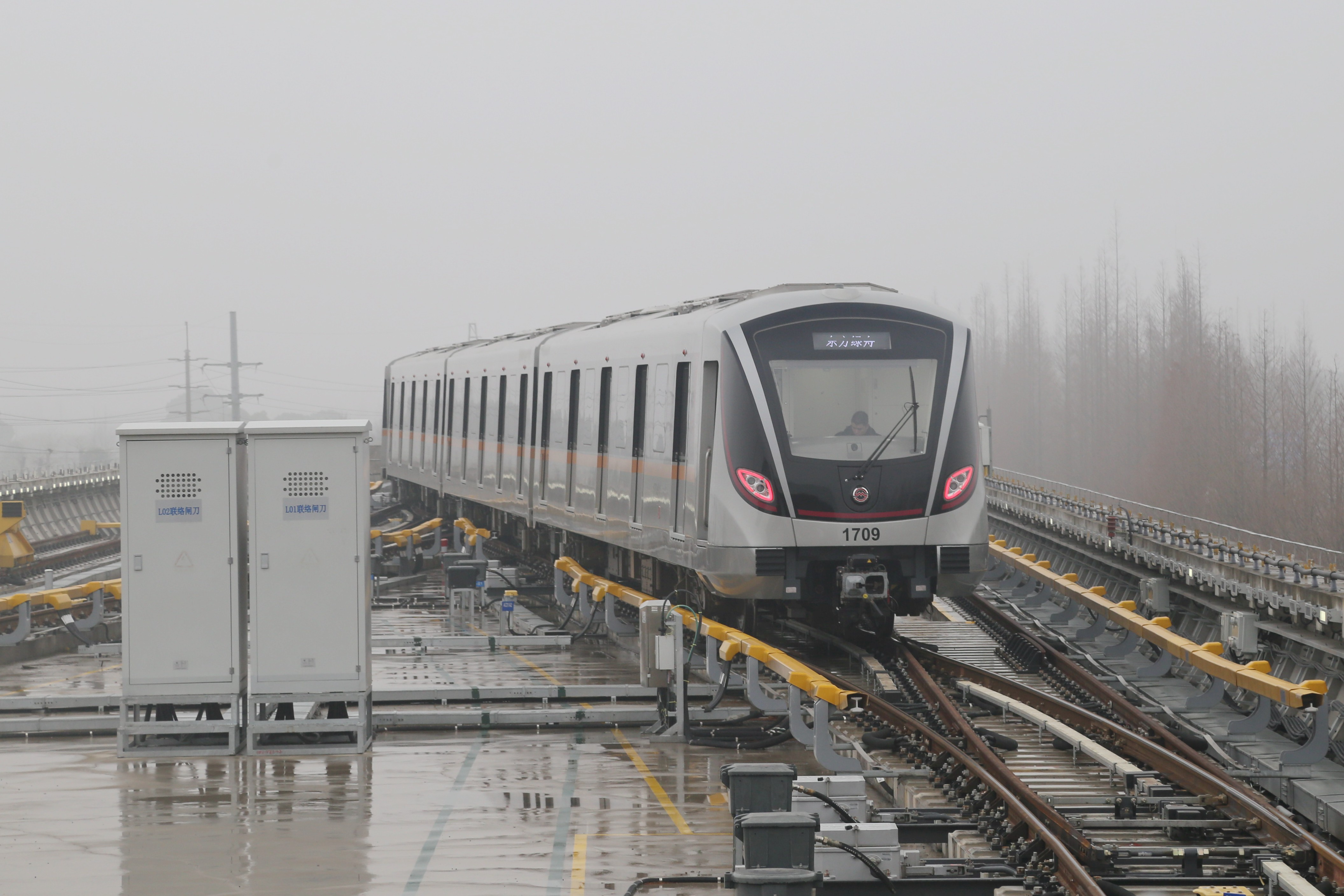
A train using the crossover to turn around just west of the station

The station is located at the intersection of Huqingping Highway and Xuejian Road, in the Qingpu District of Shanghai. It is named after the nearby Oriental Land, which is a large park overlooking Dianshan Lake. The station's location is directly across Huqingping Highway from the park's main entrance.

The station structure is elevated, with the platforms located one level above the street. The platform level consists of an island layout. Trains disembark passengers on the north platform (Platform 1), then proceed to turnaround at a crossover just west of the station, before returning to pick up passengers on the south platform (Platform 2). The street level of the station also serves as its concourse, with a service counter. Like all stations on Line 17, the station is fully accessible. The concourse and platform levels are connected by an elevator within the fare-paid zone. Toilets are located at the platform level, at the east end of the platform.

A short section of track has been built to the west of the station as a reserve for a future westerly extension of Line 17.

=== Exits ===
There are four exits of the station:

- Exit 1: Huqingping Highway, Oriental Land (east side)
- Exit 2: Xuejian Road (east side)
- Exit 3: Xuejian Road (west side)
- Exit 4: Huqingping Highway, Oriental Land (west side)
