= Xicen station =

Shanghai Metro station

Xicen 西岑
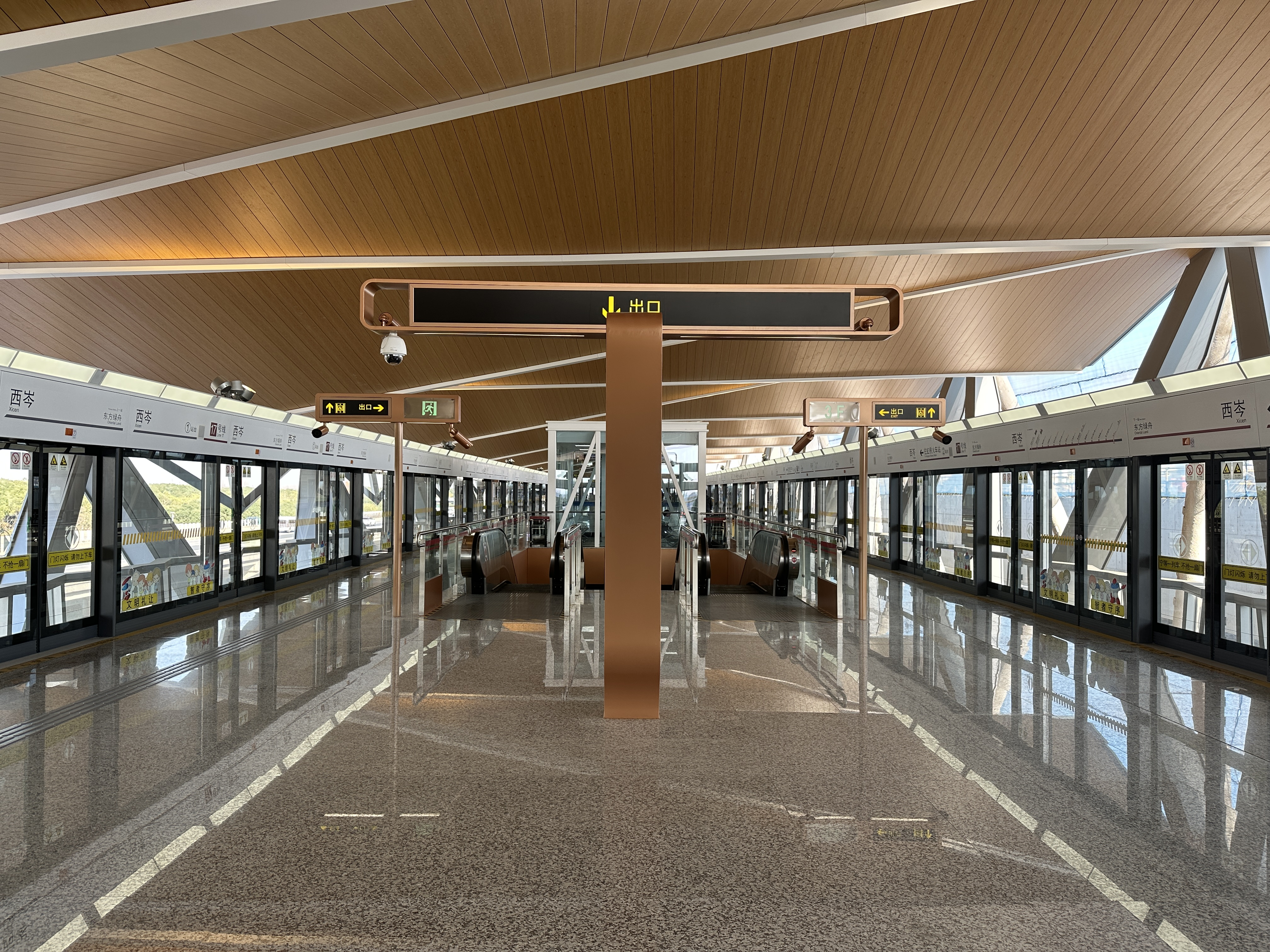
- Platform

General information
- Location: Lianxi Highway and Peiya Road, Zhujiajiao, Qingpu District, Shanghai; China
- Coordinates: 31.07242°N 120.95960°E
- Operator: Shanghai No. 2 Metro Operation Co. Ltd.
- Line: Line 17
- Platforms: 2 (1 island platform)
- Tracks: 2

Construction
- Structure type: Elevated
- Accessible: Yes

History
- Opened: 30 November 2024; 20 months ago

Services
| Preceding station | Shanghai Metro | Following station |
|---|---|---|
| Terminus | Line 17 | Oriental Land towards Hongqiao Railway Station |
Location
- Location within Shanghai

Xicen (Chinese: 西岑; pinyin: Xīcén) is a station on Line 17 of the Shanghai Metro. It is a part of the west-extension project. Located at the south of G50 Huyu Expressway and between the Lianxi Highway and Peiya Road, it serves as the western terminus of Line 17. Construction started on 28 June 2021, and the station opened on 30 November 2024.

The station is equipped with 2 exits and 2 accessible elevators.

== Description ==
=== Exits ===
There are four exits of the station, shared with the Demonstration Zone Line. This station uses Exits 1 and 4.

- Exit 1: Peiya Road
- Exit 4: Lianxi Highway
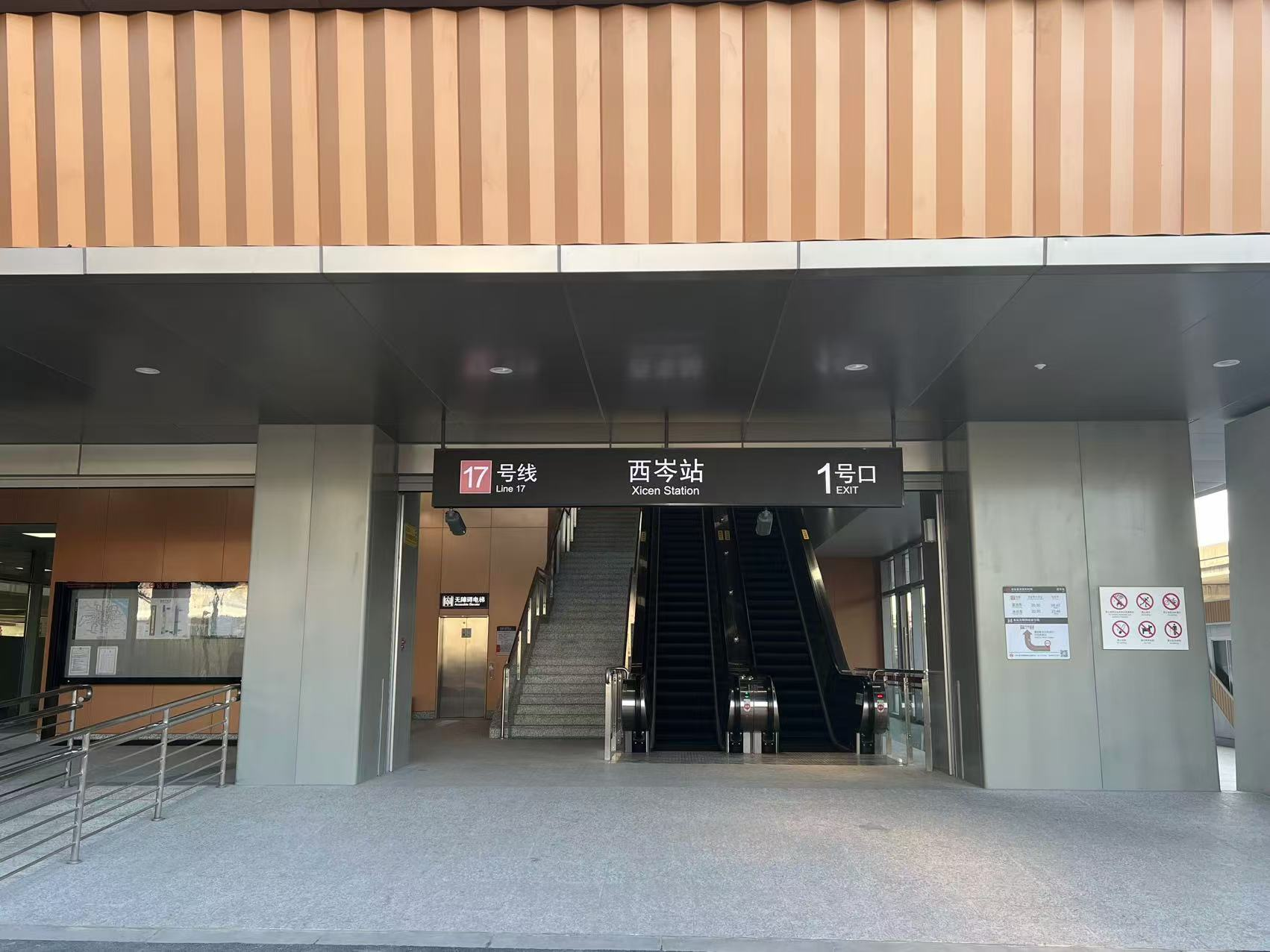
Exit 1

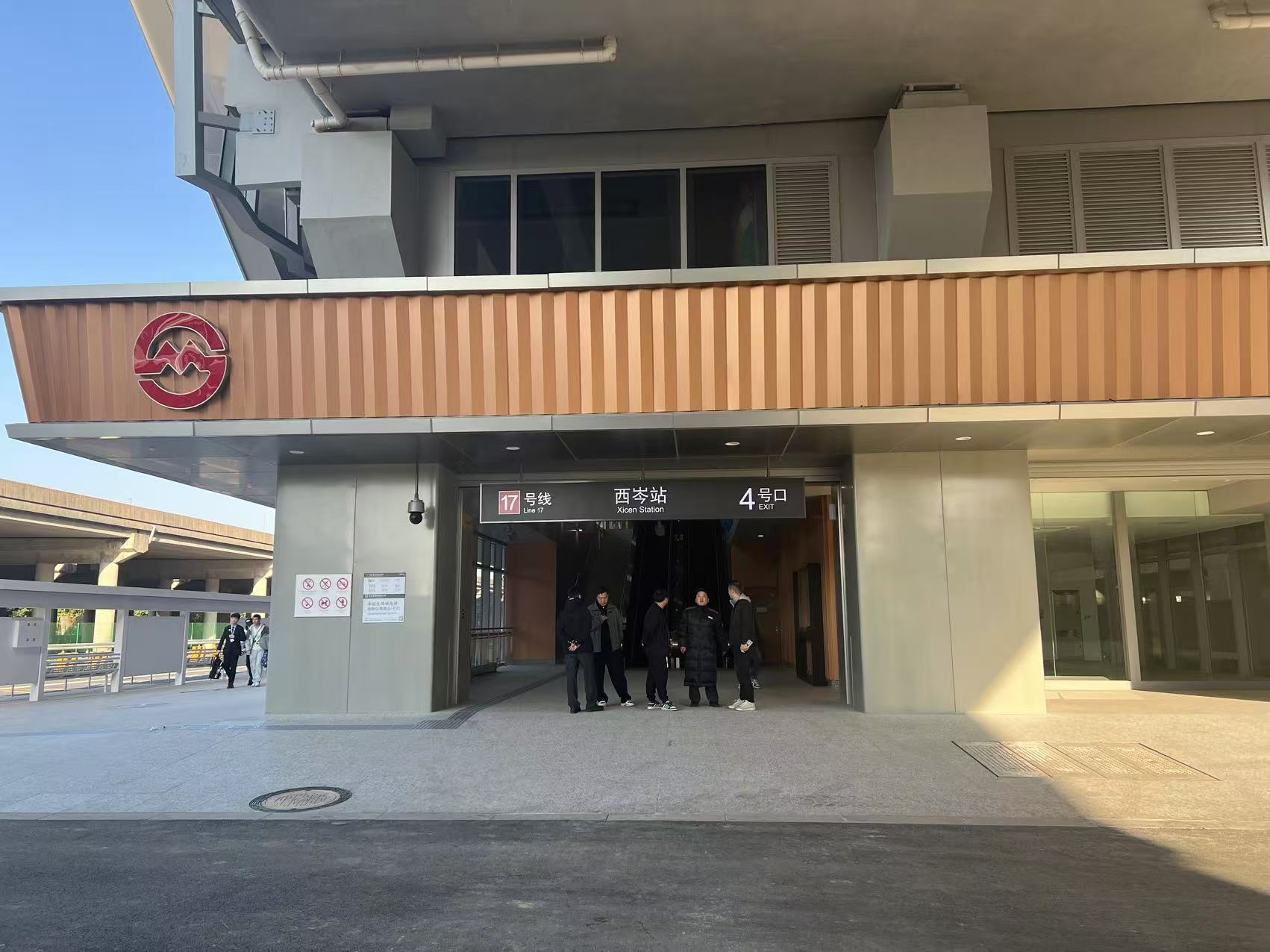
Exit 4

It is currently the westernmost station in the Shanghai Metro network.

== See also ==
- Huawei Lianqiuhu
