= Puji Bridge =

Puji Bridge ((simplified Chinese: 普济桥; traditional Chinese: 普濟橋; pinyin: Pǔjì Qiáo), may refer to:

- Puji Bridge (Shanghai), a historic stone arch bridge in the town of Jinze, Qingpu District, Shanghai, China.
- Puji Bridge (Suzhou), a historic stone arch bridge over the Shantang River in Suzhou, Jiangsu, China.
- Puji Bridge (Zunyi), a historic stone arch bridge over the Gaoqiao River in Zunyi, Guizhou, China.
