= Yuanjin Temple =

Buddhist temple in Shanghai, China

- 圆津禅院
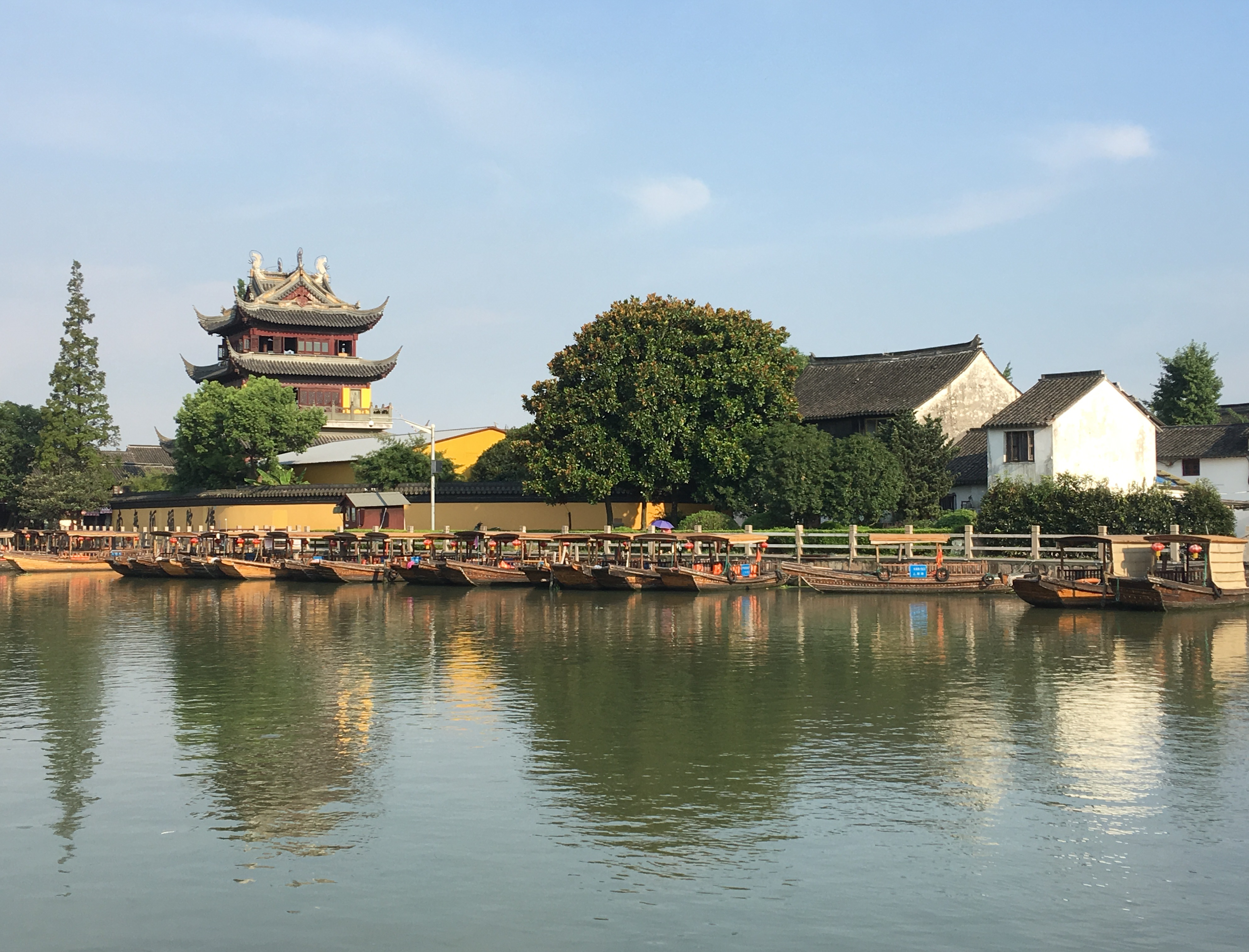
- Yuanjin Temple.

- Location within Shanghai

Religion
- Affiliation: Buddhism
- Deity: Chan Buddhism
- Leadership: Shi Hongjie (释宏戒)

Location
- Location: Zhujiajiao, Qingpu District, Shanghai
- Country: China
- Interactive map of Yuanjin Temple
- Coordinates: 31°06′47.41″N 121°02′57.24″E

Architecture
- Style: Chinese architecture
- Established: 1341
- Completed: 1658 (reconstruction)

Yuanjin Temple
- Traditional Chinese: 圓津禪院
- Simplified Chinese: 圆津禅院
Transcriptions
Standard Mandarin
- Hanyu Pinyin: Yuánjīn Chán Yuàn

Temple of Goddess
- Traditional Chinese: 娘娘廟
- Simplified Chinese: 娘娘庙
Transcriptions
Standard Mandarin
- Hanyu Pinyin: Niángniáng Miào

Yuanjin Temple (Chinese: 圆津禅院), also known as Temple of Goddess (Chinese: 娘娘庙), is a Buddhist temple located in Zhujiajiao, Qingpu District, Shanghai.

== Name ==
The temple is known as "Temple of Goddess" for the fact that it enshrines the statue of Guanyin Boddhisatva.

== History ==
The temple was originally built in 1341, during the Mongolian-ruling Yuan dynasty (1271–1368). It was rebuilt in the reign of Wanli Emperor (1573–1620) of the Ming dynasty (1368–1644). The temple was enlarged in the Shunzhi (1644–1661) and Kangxi periods (1662–1722) of the Qing dynasty (1644–1911). In 1658, abbot Tongzheng (通证) supervised the restoration of the entire temple complex. Yifeng Hall (亦峰居), Caoxi Humble Cottage (漕溪草堂), Xigong Hall (息躬室), Qinghua Pavilion (清华阁) and other halls were added to the temple. Of them, Qinghua Pavilion was the most prestigious structure. In early Qing dynasty, the 3rd-generation abbot of the temple and a few of his successors were specialized in either painting, epigraphy or poetry, so literati and scholars often held poetry saloons and literary discussions in the temple, giving the temple a deep cultural heritage.

A modern renovation of the entire temple complex was carried out in 1991. The temple was officially reopened to the public in 1995.

On November 6, 2018, Russian Prime Minister Dmitry Medvedev visited the temple.
