= Puji Bridge (Shanghai) =

Bridge in Qingpu, Shanghai, China

Puji Bridge 普济桥
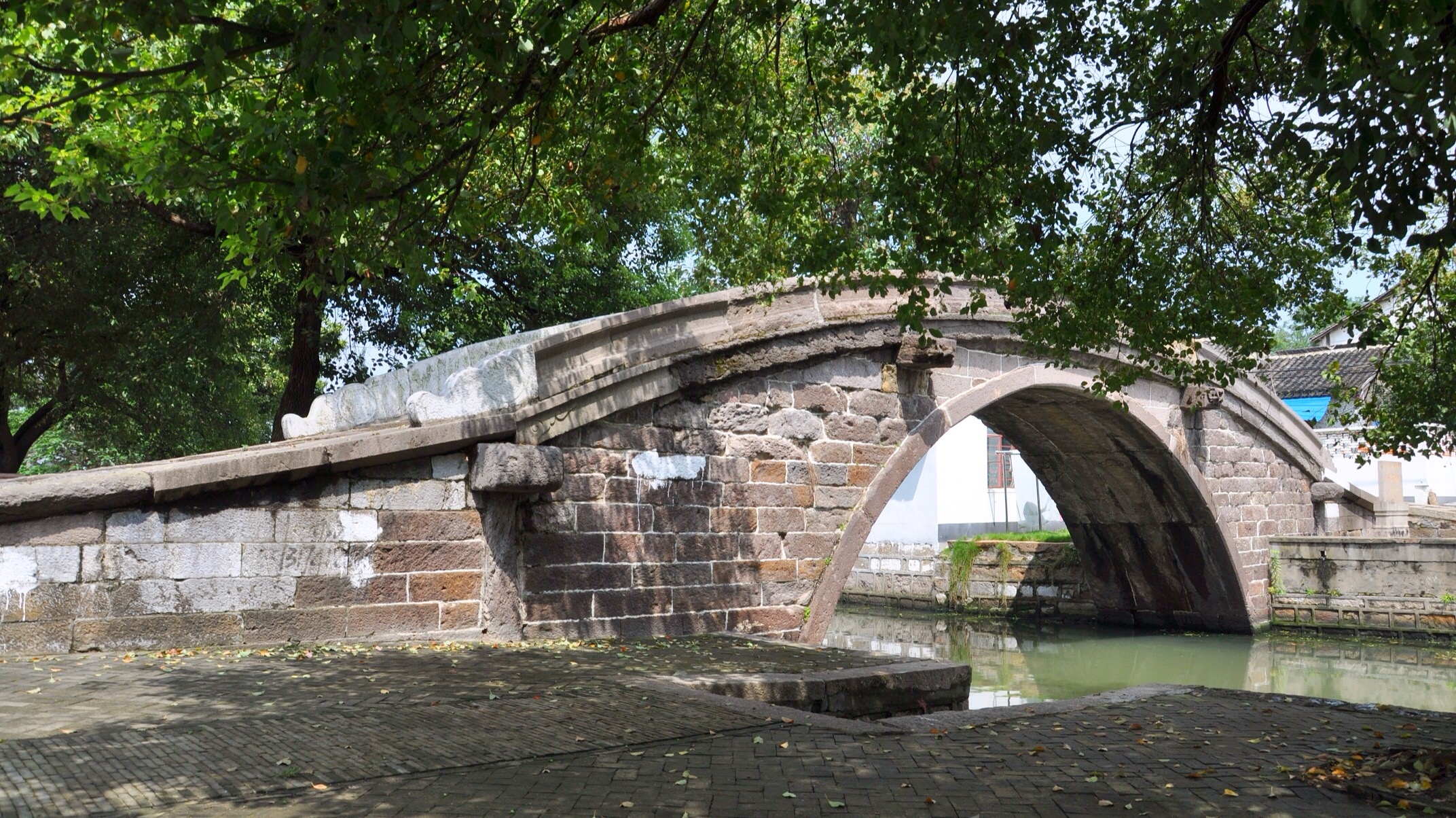
- Puji Bridge in September 2014.
- Coordinates: 31°02′07″N 120°55′18″E
- Locale: Jinze, Qingpu District, Shanghai
- Other name(s): Shengtang Bridge

Characteristics
- Design: Arch Bridge
- Material: Stone
- Total length: 26.7 metres (88 ft)
- Width: 2.75 metres (9 ft 0 in)
- Height: 5 metres (16 ft)
- Longest span: 10.5 metres (34 ft)

History
- Construction start: 1267
- Construction end: 1267
- Opened: 1267

The Puji Bridge (simplified Chinese: 普济桥; traditional Chinese: 普濟橋; pinyin: Pǔjì Qiáo), commonly known as Shengtang Bridge (Chinese: 圣堂桥), is a historic stone arch bridge in the town of Jinze, Qingpu District, Shanghai.

== Name ==
The bridge is named after Shengtang Temple, a Buddhist temple nearby the bridge.

== History ==
The bridge was originally built in 1267, in the 3rd year of Xianchun period (1265–1274) of the Southern Song dynasty (1127–1279). It was renovated in the Ming and Qing dynasties (1368–1911). In 1987 it was inscribed to the fourth batch of Municipal Level Cultural Heritage List by the Shanghai Municipal Government.

== Architecture ==
With one arch, Puji Bridge is 26.7 metres (88 ft) long and 5 metres (16 ft) high, very similar to Wan'an Bridge, therefore the two being collectively known as the "Sister Bridges". It is made of a very precious purple stone, namely the fluorite. Washed by rain, it appears shiny purple under the sun, sparkling and colorful.
