= K. K. Chen =

Chinese-American scientist

- 陳克恢
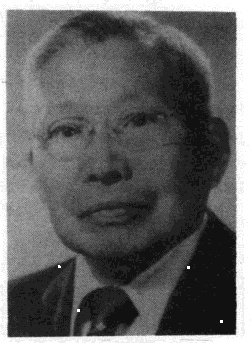
- Born: February 26, 1898; Jinze, Qingpu County, China
- Died: December 12, 1988 (aged 90); San Francisco, California, United States
- Education: University of Wisconsin-Madison; Johns Hopkins University
- Spouse: Amy Ling (凌叔浩)
- Scientific career
- Fields: Pharmacology
- Workplaces: Eli Lilly and Company

Chinese name
- Traditional Chinese: 陳克恢
- Simplified Chinese: 陈克恢
Transcriptions
Standard Mandarin
- Hanyu Pinyin: Chén Kèhuī

Ko Kuei Chen (Chinese: 陳克恢; pinyin: Chén Kèhuī; 26 February 1898 – 12 December 1988) was a Chinese-American scientist who led pharmacological research at Eli Lilly and Company for 34 years. He is known for his work with ephedrine, cyanide poisoning therapy, and toad venom steroids. He was elected an inaugural member of Academia Sinica in 1948 and awarded the Remington Medal in 1965 for excellence in pharmacy.

== Career ==
Chen was born in 1898 in Jinze city, now a town in Shanghai. After studying at Tsinghua College in Beijing, he moved to the United States in 1918 to further his education, earning a BS in 1920 and a PhD in 1923 from the University of Wisconsin-Madison. In 1923 he returned to China to work with CF Schmidt at Peking Union Medical College studying the effects of ephedrine. Upon finishing this appointment, he returned to the States to complete his studies with an MD from Johns Hopkins University in 1927. He continued working at Johns Hopkins for a couple of years before accepting an offer in 1929 from Eli Lilly and Company to be the Director of Pharmacological Research. He held this position until his retirement in 1963. During this time, he also accepted a part-time faculty appointment from the Indiana University School of Medicine in 1937. Upon leaving Eli Lilly, he became full-time faculty and taught until 1968.

== Research ==
K. K. Chen was mostly known for bringing ephedrine to the western world. He developed his own isolation procedure from the Chinese herb Ma Huang (ephedra sinica). Its medicinal value was long known in China as a remedy for asthma. Further research showed its value in treating hay fever and whooping cough. Other studies that may be credited to him include the successful treatment of cyanide poisoning with nitrite-thiosulfate therapy, structure-activity relationship of over 400 cardiac glycosides and toad venom steroids, heptatotoxic action of Senecio alkaloids, and synthetic analgesic drugs of the methadone series.

== Personal life ==
Education was always an important factor in his life, learning the teachings of Confucius at a young age. He furthered his English with the debate team while at the University of Wisconsin and played the tuba with the ROTC. He graduated there in 1920 with Phi Beta Kappa honors and finished his PhD in 1923. In order to help his ailing mother, he returned to China, continued his research, and taught classes at Peking Union Medical College. There he met Amy Ling, his future wife. They courted for several years and got married in 1929 after returning to the states. Upon Chen's hiring at Eli Lilly and Company, they settled down in Indianapolis, IN. Amy was a noted scientist herself and co-authored over 150 articles with her husband. Chen also had a keen interest in Chinese art and helped Eli Lilly amass a substantial collection which was eventually donated to the Indianapolis Museum of Art. His favorite sport was baseball. After his retirement in 1968, they moved to San Francisco until his death in 1988. He currently rests next to Amy in Bellefontaine Cemetery, St. Louis, MO.

== Honors and recognition ==
- 1920 Phi Beta Kappa, Univ Wisconsin
- 1927 China Foundation Prize
- 1946 Honorary Sc.D., Philadelphia College of Pharmacy and Science
- 1948 Academician, Academia Sinica, Republic of China
- 1952 Honorary Sc.D., Univ Wisconsin
- 1952 President, American Society for Pharmacology and Experimental Therapeutics
- 1956 State Dept Delegate, 1st General Assembly of Intl Union of Physiological Sciences, Brussels
- 1963 KK Chen Fellowship & Award established, Indiana University School of Medicine
- 1965 Remington Honor Medal
- 1966 AMA Distinguished Service Award
- 1971 Honorary Sc.D., Indiana-Purdue University
- 1972 President, International Union of Pharmacology
- 1974 Scientific Award, Chinese-American Medical Society
- 1987 KK Chen Auditorium dedicated, Federation of American Societies for Experimental Biology
- 2006 KK Chen Memorial Exhibit dedicated, Eli Lilly and Company
