= Fangsheng Bridge =

Bridge in Qingpu, Shanghai, China

Fangsheng Bridge 放生桥
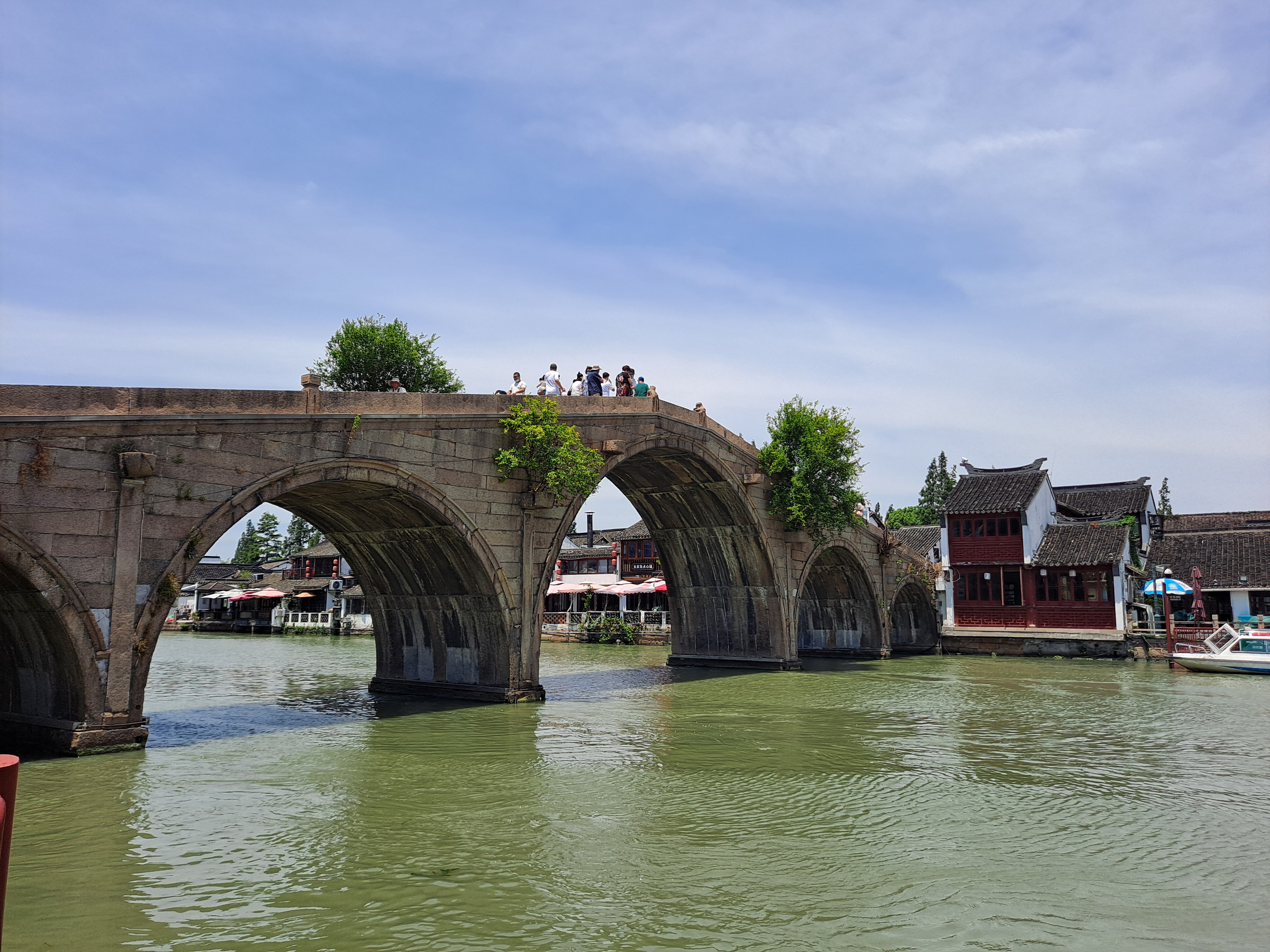
- Free Life Bridge in October 2011.
- Coordinates: 31°06′48.38″N 121°03′05.86″E
- Crosses: Cao Port (漕港)
- Locale: Zhujiajiao, Qingpu, Shanghai, China
- Other name(s): Fangsheng Bridge

Characteristics
- Design: Arch Bridge
- Material: Stone
- Total length: 70.8 metres (232 ft)
- Width: 5.8 metres (19 ft)
- Height: 7.4 metres (24 ft)

History
- Constructed by: Xingchao (性潮)
- Construction start: 1571
- Construction end: 1812 (reconstruction)
- Opened: 1571

Fangsheng Bridge (Chinese: 放生桥; pinyin: Fàngshēng Qiáo) is a historic stone arch bridge over the Cao Port in Zhujiajiao, Qingpu, Shanghai, China.

== History ==
The bridge was originally built in 1571 with funds collected by monk Xingchao (Chinese: 性潮) from Cimen Temple (Chinese: 慈门寺). In the Ming and Qing dynasties (1368–1911), local monks would hold a ceremony on the bridge, releasing live fish into the port. It had been on the list of "The Ten Views of Zhujiajiao". It was rebuilt in 1812, in the ruling of Jiaqing Emperor (1796–1820) of the Qing dynasty (1644–1911).

On November 17, 1987, it has been designated as a municipal level cultural heritage by the Shanghai Municipal Government.

== Architecture ==
70.8-metre (232 ft) long and 5.8-metre (19 ft) wide, it is the largest stone bridge in Shanghai. It is of five-arch type. The bridge has a gentle slope as it adopts ultra-thin piers and arches with modest size changes, making it span naturally across the river.

== Film Culture and Manga ==
- Mission: Impossible III
- Mobile Suit Gundam SEED in Shanghai. Lacus Clyne standing Fangsheng Bridge waiting to meet X 108 Freedom Gundam Piloted by: Kira Yamato.

== See also ==
- List of bridges in China
