= Xu Jing =

Xu Jing may refer to:

- Xu Jing (Three Kingdoms) (許靖, died 222), Shu Han official
- Li Jing (Southern Tang) (916–961), Southern Tang emperor, originally Xu Jingtong (徐景通), briefly Xu Jing (徐璟) 937–939
- Xu Jing (mountaineer) (许竞; 1927–2011), Chinese mountaineer
- Xu Jing (table tennis) (徐竞; born 1968), Chinese-Taiwanese table tennis player
- Xu Jing (archer) (徐晶; born 1990), Chinese archer

== See also ==
- Xujing (徐泾), a town in Shanghai, China
