= Wan'an Bridge (Shanghai) =

Wan'an Bridge 万安桥
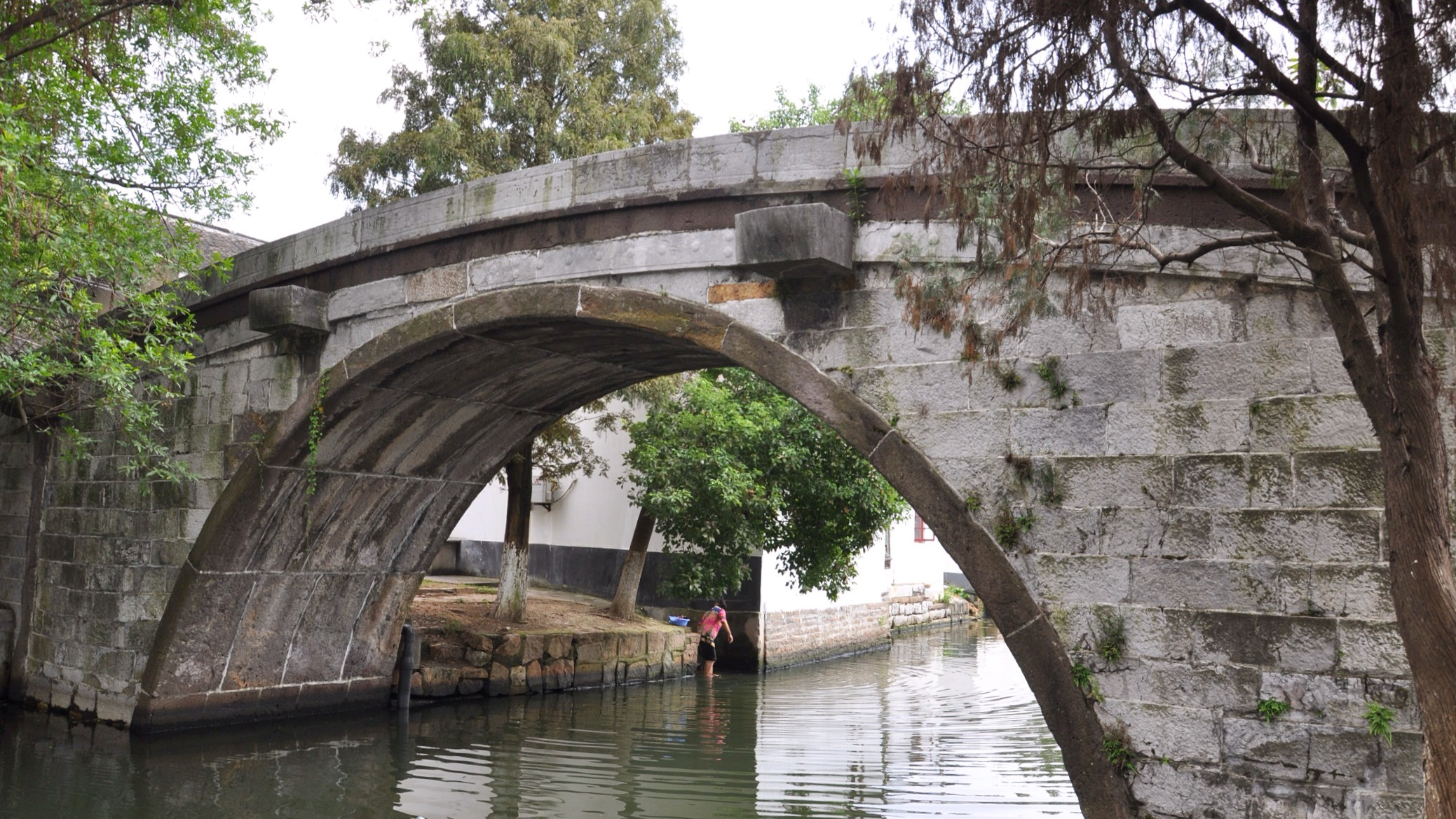
- Wan'an Bridge in October 2014.
- Coordinates: 31°02′22″N 120°55′11″E
- Crosses: City River (市河)
- Locale: Jinze, Qingpu District, Shanghai

Characteristics
- Design: Arch Bridge
- Material: Stone
- Total length: 29 metres (95 ft)
- Width: 2.6 metres (8 ft 6 in)
- Height: 4.8 metres (16 ft)
- Longest span: 10.2 metres (33 ft)

History
- Construction start: 1260–1264
- Construction end: 1260–1264
- Opened: 1260–1264

The Wan'an Bridge (simplified Chinese: 万安桥; traditional Chinese: 萬安橋; pinyin: Wàn'ān Qiáo) is a historic stone arch bridge over the City River in the town of Jinze, Qingpu District, Shanghai.

== Name ==
The bridge takes its name from a dictum "Peace and serene for thousands of generations, good and prosperous life for all people" (万世安详、万民安业).

== History ==
The original bridge dates back to the Jingding period (1260–1264) of the Southern Song dynasty (1127–1279), and underwent three renovations, respectively in the ruling of Jiajing Emperor (1522–1566) and in the reign of Wanli Emperor (1573–1620) and in the Qianlong period (1736–1795) of the Qing dynasty (1644–1911). In May 2001, it was designated as a cultural heritage conservation unit of Qingpu District.

== Architecture ==
It is 29 metres (95 ft) long, 2.6 metres (8 ft 6 in) wide, and 4.8 metres (16 ft) high. It is of single-arch type. It is the largest stone bridge in the town and is dubbed "Of the 42 bridges, Wan'an Bridge is the top one" (金泽四十二虹，万安桥居首).
