= Zhaoxiang (town) =

Town in Shanghai, China

Zhaoxiang Town
- Town

Chinese transcription(s)
  - Simplified: 赵巷镇
  - Traditional: 趙巷鎮
  - Pinyin: Zhàoxiàng Zhèn
- Location in Shanghai
- Coordinates: 31.1490°N 121.1962°E
- Country: China
- Municipality: Shanghai
- District: Qingpu District

Area
  - Total: 40.47 km^{2} (15.63 sq mi)

Population (2020)
  - Total: 143,350
  - Density: 3,542/km^{2} (9,174/sq mi)
- Time zone: UTC+8 (China Standard)
- Postal code: 201702
- Area code: 021
- Website: www.shqp.gov.cn/zhaox/

Zhaoxiang (Chinese: 赵巷镇; pinyin: Zhàoxiàng) is a town in Qingpu District, Shanghai, China. As of 2020, Zhaoxiang has a population of 143350 and an area of 40.47 km^{2} (15.63 sq mi).

== Transportation ==
Zhaoxiang has access to Shanghai Metro Line 17 at Zhaoxiang station. The G50 Shanghai–Chongqing Expressway and China National Highway 318 pass through the town.

== Administrative Divisions ==
As of 2022, Zhaoxiang administers the following 3 residents' committees, 19 residential communities, and 8 villages:

- Zhaoxiang Residents' Committee (Chinese: 赵巷居委会)
- Beisong Residents' Committee (Chinese: 北崧居委会)
- Xinzhen Residents' Committee (Chinese: 新镇居委会)
- Jinhulu Residential Community (Chinese: 金葫芦社区)
- Jinhulu Second Residential Community (Chinese: 金葫芦第二社区)
- Songhan Residential Community (Chinese: 崧涵社区)
- Songhu Residential Community (Chinese: 崧湖社区)
- Jiafu East Residential Community (Chinese: 佳福东社区)
- Songxin Residential Community (Chinese: 崧鑫社区)
- Xiangjia Residential Community (Chinese: 巷佳社区)
- Huaqin Residential Community (Chinese: 华沁社区)
- Huaxiu Residential Community (Chinese: 华秀社区)
- Jiayu Residential Community (Chinese: 佳昱社区)
- Longlian Residential Community (Chinese: 龙联社区)
- Xiujing Residential Community (Chinese: 秀景社区)
- Jiahuang Residential Community (Chinese: 佳煌社区)
- Jiahui Residential Community (Chinese: 佳辉社区)
- Yitai Residential Community (Chinese: 逸泰社区)
- Yixiu Residential Community (Chinese: 逸秀社区)
- Longyu Residential Community (Chinese: 龙御社区)
- Herui Residential Community (Chinese: 和瑞社区)
- Dekang Residential Community (Chinese: 德康社区)
- Nansong Village (Chinese: 南崧村)
- Fangxia Village (Chinese: 方夏村)
- Hemu Village (Chinese: 和睦村)
- Chuitao Village (Chinese: 垂姚村)
- Shenjingtang Village (Chinese: 沈泾塘村)
- Songze Village (Chinese: 崧泽村)
- Zhongbu Village (Chinese: 中步村)
- Jinhui Village (Chinese: 金汇村)
