= Jinze =

Jinze Town
- Town

Chinese transcription(s)
  - Simplified: 金泽镇
  - Traditional: 金澤鎮
  - Pinyin: Jīnzé Zhèn
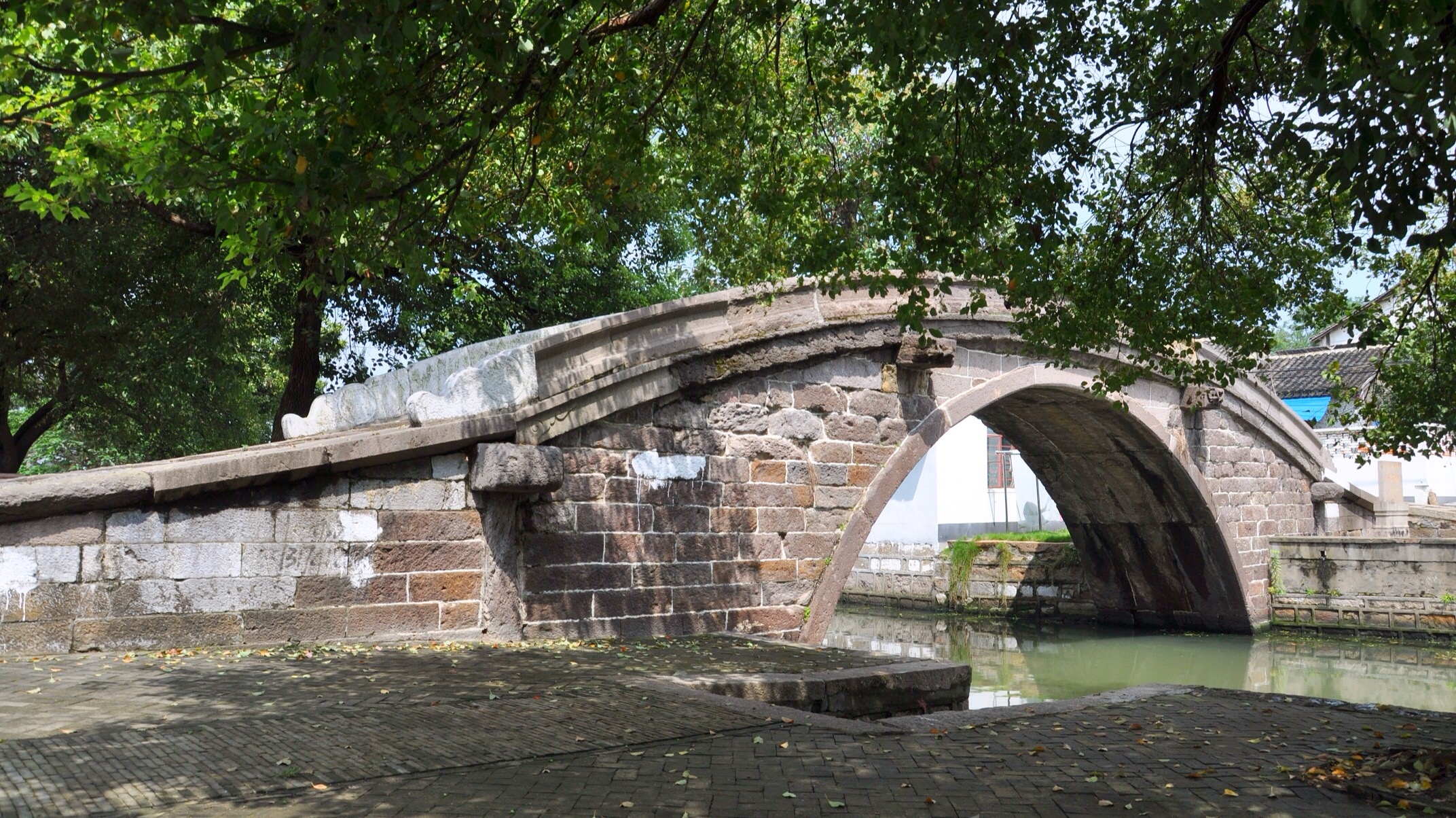
- Puji Bridge in the town.

- Location in Shanghai
- Coordinates: 31°02′23″N 120°54′59″E
- Country: China
- Municipality: Shanghai
- District: Qingpu District

Area
  - Total: 108.49 km^{2} (41.89 sq mi)

Population (2017)
  - Total: 60,800
  - Density: 560/km^{2} (1,450/sq mi)
- Time zone: UTC+8 (China Standard)
- Postal code: 201700
- Area code: 021

Jinze (Chinese: 金泽镇) is a town in Qingpu District of Shanghai, China. As of the 2017 census it had a population of 60,800 and an area of 108.49-square-kilometre (41.89 sq mi). The town is bordered by two provinces, namely Zhejiang and Jiangsu. With convenient land and water transportation, it is an important transport hub linking Shanghai, Zhejiang and Jiangsu. It is surrounded by the towns of Shenta, Zhouzhuang and Jinxi on the northwest, Liantang Town on the southeast, Zhujiajiao Town on the east, and the towns of Dingshan and Dashun on the southwest.

== Name ==
Jinze, formerly known as "Bainingli" (白苧里; Báinínglǐ). According to Chorography of Jiangnan (江南通志), the name derives from a farmer got a stone of the same colour as gold.

== History ==
In 978, it was under the jurisdiction of Huating County (华亭县). In 1279, Jinze was under the jurisdiction of Songjiang Prefecture (松江府) of Zhejiang Province.

In 1573, Jinze belonged to Qingpu County. In 1743, Jinze came under the jurisdiction of Huashang Township. In 1909, the Qingpu County was divided into 16 autonomous districts, Jinze was one of them.

In 1912, Jinze city was downgraded to a township. In 1929, the whole county was divided into 13 districts, Jinze was the Fifth District. In 1934, after the merger of districts, it belonged to the Fourth District. In February 1948, after the adjustment of administrative divisions, Jinze became a township.

In July 1949, Qingpu County was divided into 8 districts, Jinze was one of them. In May 1957, Jinze Township was founded. In September 1958, it was renamed "Jinze People's Commune". In May 1986, it was upgraded to a town. In March 2004, the towns of Shangta (商榻镇) and Xicen (西岑镇) were merged into the town.

== Administrative division ==
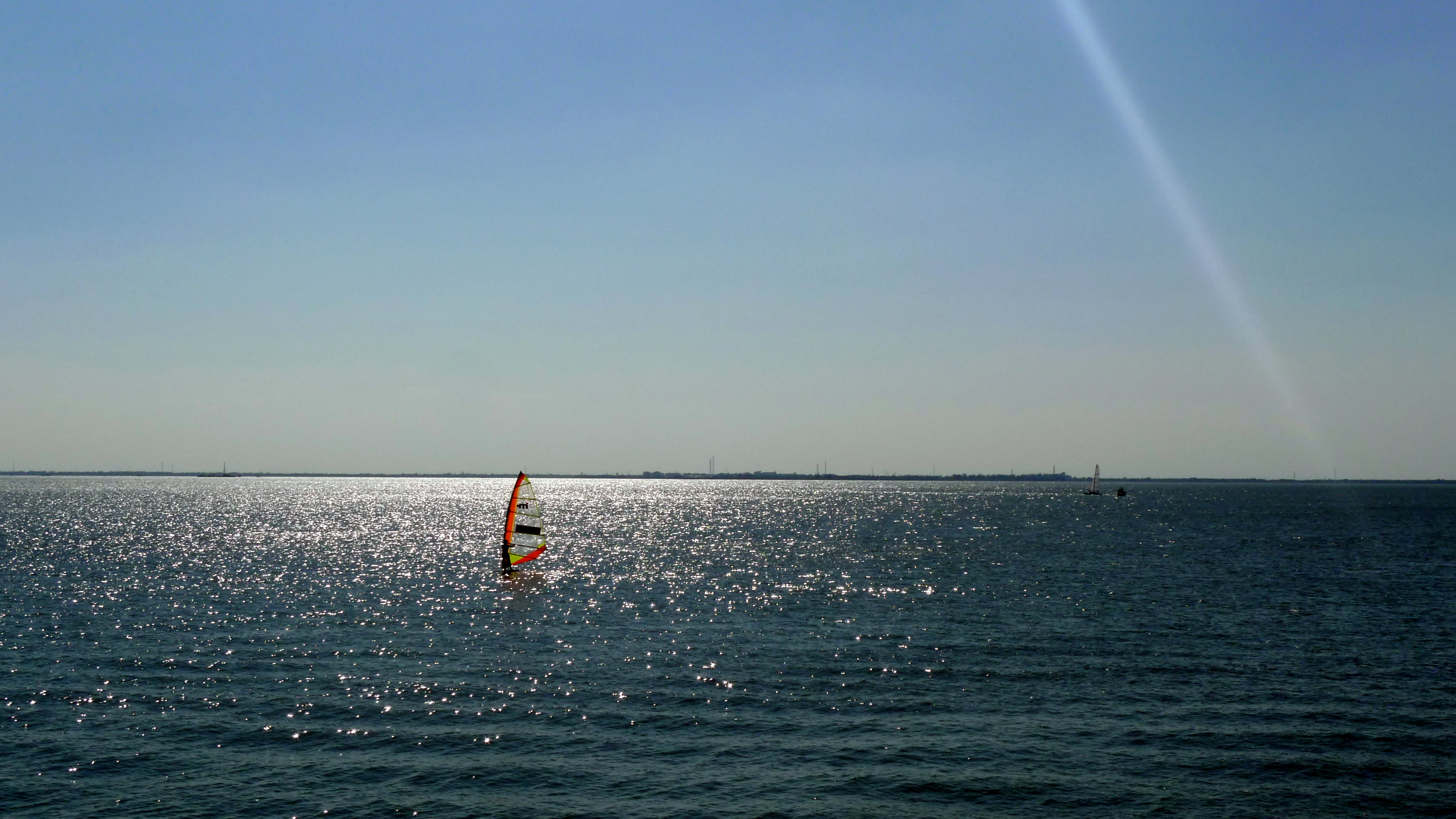
Dianshan Lake.

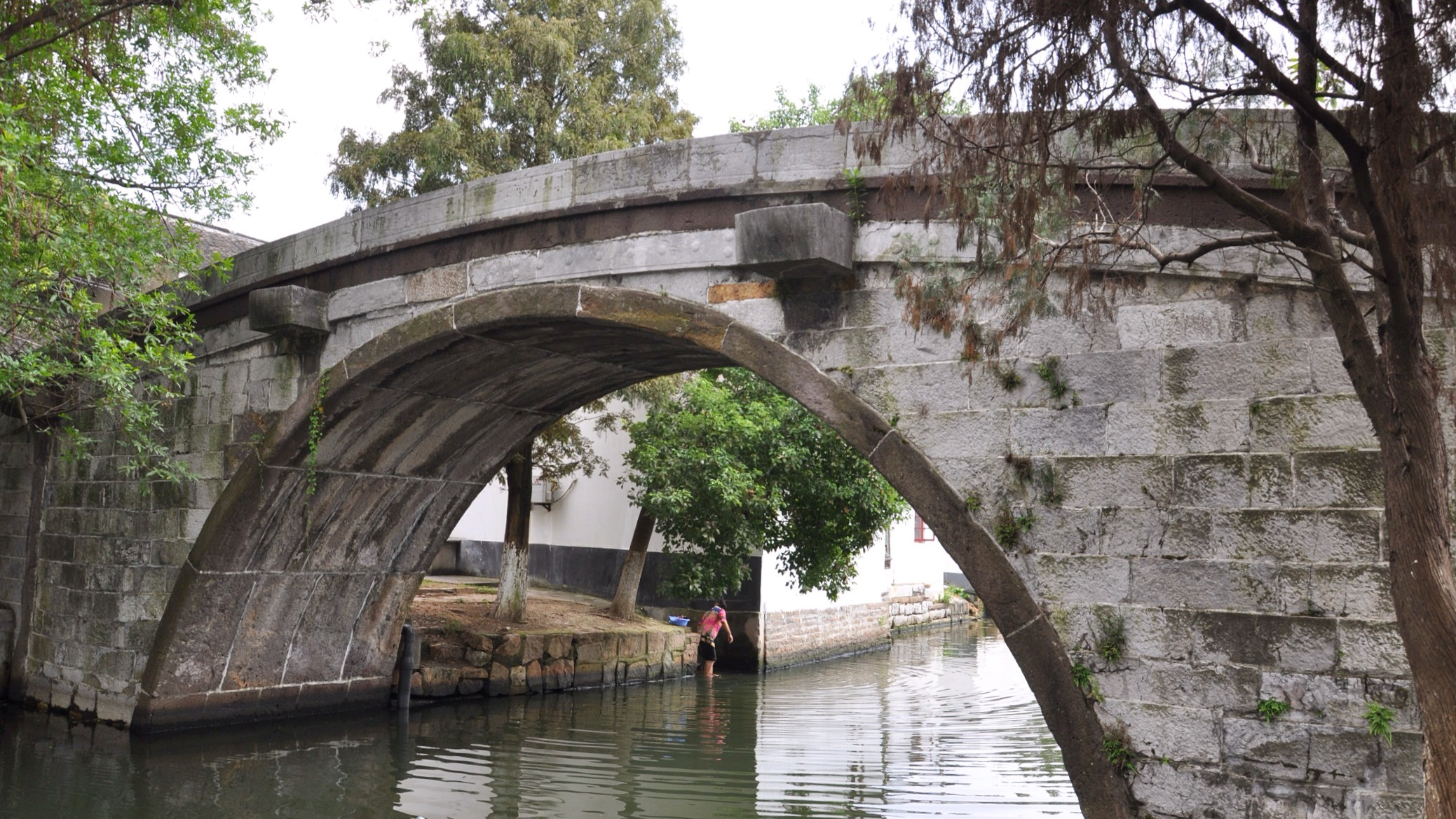
Wan'an Bridge.

As of 2017, the town is divided into 5 communities and 30 villages:

- Jinxi Community (金溪社区)
- Jinyang Community (金杨社区)
- Xicen Community (西岑社区)
- Liansheng Community (莲盛社区)
- Shangta Community (商榻社区)
- Xuli (徐李村)
- Xinchi (新驰村)
- Jinze (金泽村)
- Yangwan (杨湾村)
- Dongxi (东西村)
- Jianguo (建国村)
- Jinyao (金姚村)
- Xingang (新港村)
- Cenbo (岑卜村)
- Xicen (西岑村)
- Santang (三塘村)
- Yutian (育田村)
- Hezhu (河祝村)
- Aiguo (爱国村)
- Dongtian (东天村)
- Rentun (任屯村)
- Tianshanzhuang (田山庄村)
- Gongdu (龚都村)
- Qiansheng (钱盛村)
- Dianhu (淀湖村)
- Lianhu (莲湖村)
- Caibang (蔡浜村)
- Dongxing (东星村)
- Wanggang (王港村)
- Shuangxiang (双祥村)
- Nanxin (南新村)
- Chendong (陈东村)
- Xuemi (雪米村)
- Dianxi (淀西村)
- Shagang (沙港村)

== Geography ==
The Dianshan Lake is located in the town, it is the largest freshwater lake in Shanghai.

Jinze is in the subtropical oceanic monsoon climate zone and exhibits four distinct seasons. It has an average annual temperature of 15.5 °C (59.9 °F), total annual rainfall of 1,056-millimetre (41.6 in), and a frost-free period of 247 days.

== Economy ==
The local economy is primarily based upon aquaculture and local industry. The main aquatic products are crabs, turtles, eels, shrimps and various freshwater fish.

== Culture ==
The Farmland and Mountain Folk Song (田山歌; Tiánshān Gē) is a national-level intangible cultural heritage.

== Tourist attractions ==
According to historical records, there had been "Six temples, a tower, thirteen archways and forty-two bridges" in the town, among which 21 old bridges survived till today. It is the only town that has so many old bridges in Shanghai, thus earning itself the accolade "the top Bridge Town of Jiangnan region". The five bridges spanning parallel over the 350 metres (1,150 ft) river course in the vicinity of Xiatang Street in particular, were built respectively starting in the Song dynasty, so there was a saying "Bridges of four dynasties are stringed by one river". Of the five, Puji Bridge and Wan'an Bridge, built in the Southern Song dynasty (1127–1279), are the oldest stone arch bridges in Shanghai. The two being collectively known as the "Sister Bridges".

== Religion ==
Yihao Temple (颐浩寺; Yíhào Sì) is a Buddhist temple in the town. It was originally built in 1260, during the southern Song dynasty (1127–1279) and renovated under the following dynasties. The temple reached unprecedented fame during the Yuan dynasty (1271–1368), in this respect overtaking Lingyin Temple and Chengtian Temple.

== Transportation ==
The town is connected to two highways: National Highway G318 and G50 Shanghai–Chongqing Expressway.

The main channel is the Taipu River (太浦河; Tàipǔ Hé).

== Notable people ==
- Wang Dajue (王大觉), writer.
- K. K. Chen (陈克恢), Chinese-American pharmacologist.
- Jiang Linhua (蒋林华), sailing competitor.
