= Gao Kang =

Chinese politician

Gāo Kàng 高亢

District Governor of Qingpu, Shanghai
- In office July 2008 – In Office
- Preceded by: Jiang Yao

Personal details
- Born: January 1, 1957 (age 68) Shenyang, Liaoning, China
- Party: Chinese Communist Party

Gao Kang (Simplified Chinese: 高亢; Traditional Chinese: 高亢; Pinyin: Gāo Kàng) (born January 1957) is a politician of the People's Republic of China. He was born in Shenyang, Liaoning, and is currently the District Governor of Qingpu, Shanghai.

== Education & Background ==
He graduated from Fudan University. He also holds both qualifications of senior economist and senior political professional. Gao joined the Chinese Communist Party in May 1977 and has been working since March 1975.
