= Puji Bridge (Suzhou) =

Bridge in Suzhou, Jiangsu, China

Puji Bridge 普济桥
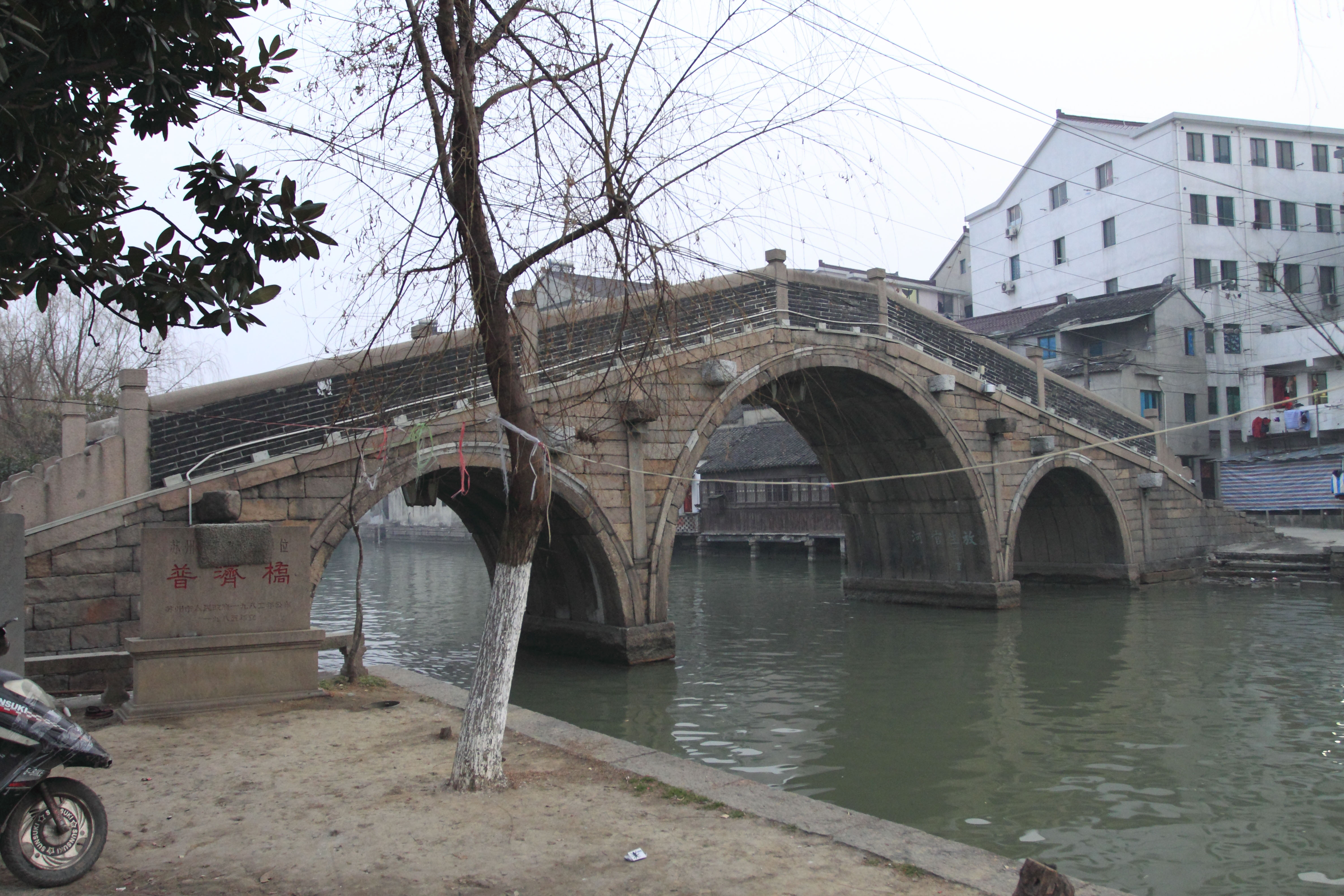
- Puji Bridge in 2011.
- Coordinates: 31°19′40″N 120°35′11″E
- Crosses: Shantang River
- Locale: Gusu District, Suzhou, Jiangsu

Characteristics
- Design: Arch Bridge
- Material: Stone
- Total length: 38.69 metres (126.9 ft)
- Width: 4.05 metres (13.3 ft)
- Height: 4.37 metres (14.3 ft)
- Longest span: 9.16 metres (30.1 ft)

History
- Construction start: 1710
- Construction end: 1710
- Opened: 1710

Location
- Interactive map of Puji Bridge

The Puji Bridge (simplified Chinese: 普济桥; traditional Chinese: 普濟橋; pinyin: Pǔjì Qiáo) is a historic stone arch bridge over the Shantang River in the Gusu District of Suzhou, Jiangsu.

== History ==
The original bridge dates back to the Tang dynasty (618–907), which mentioned it in the Geography of Wu (吴地记). At that time, it was made of woods. In 1494 during the Ming dynasty (1368–1644), local people Zhou Fang (周方) raised funds to restore it. His deeds were recorded in the Annuals of Gusu (姑苏志).

The bridge was built in 1710, in the 49th year of Kangxi Emperor in the Qing dynasty (1644–1911). It underwent three renovations, respectively in the ruling of Qianlong Emperor (1793) and in the reign of Daoguang Emperor (1841) and in 1925.

It was inscribed to the Suzhou Municipal Level Cultural Heritage List in 1982. In March 2019, it was added to Jiangsu's List of Provincial Cultural Heritage.

== Architecture ==
The bridge measures 38.69 metres (126.9 ft) long, 4.05 metres (13.3 ft) wide, and approximately 4.37 metres (14.3 ft) high.
