= Xujing =

Town in Shanghai, China

Xujing Town
- Town

Chinese transcription(s)
  - Simplified: 徐泾镇
  - Traditional: 徐涇鎮
  - Pinyin: Xújīng Zhèn
- Location in Shanghai
- Coordinates: 31.1731°N 121.2723°E
- Country: China
- Municipality: Shanghai
- District: Qingpu District

Area
  - Total: 38.55 km^{2} (14.88 sq mi)

Population (2021)
  - Total: 211,590
  - Density: 5,489/km^{2} (14,220/sq mi)
- Time zone: UTC+8 (China Standard)
- Postal code: 201702
- Area code: 021

Xujing (Chinese: 徐泾镇; pinyin: xújīngzhèn) is a town in Qingpu District, Shanghai, China. As of 2021, Xujing has a population of 211,590 and an area of 38.55 km^{2} (14.88 sq mi).

== Geography ==
Xujing borders two districts of Shanghai: Minhang and Songjiang. It is considered one of the first new city developments of Shanghai, being the most important "eastern wing" of Qingpu district.

== History ==
The administrative division of Xujing was formed in July 1957, first as a township. In October 1958, the title of township was abolished and Xujing was made into a people's commune.

In April 1984, the title of Xujing was reverted to township.

In December 1993, the Shanghai Municipal People's Congress approved changing the status of Xujing to being a town.

In 2015, the Shanghai National Exhibition and Convention Center opened in Xujing and consists of four exhibition halls, the NECC Plaza, office buildings and a hotel. Since then, it has hosted various events including concerts and expos.

=== Panlong Town ===
Panlong'an (Chinese: 蟠龙庵; pinyin: pánlóng'ān) is an ancient water town within Xujing dating back to the Sui dynasty. In 2001, it was made a historical protected zone in Shanghai.

As part of the Yangtze River Delta integration initiative, Panlong Tiandi (Chinese: 蟠龙天地), a commercial complex offering many shopping facilities and activities, was opened in April 2023, bringing in around 200,000 tourists over the five-day-long Golden Week for the Labour Day break.

== Transportation ==
Xujing has access to Line 17 and Line 2 of the Shanghai Metro system. The G15 Shenyang–Haikou Expressway, G50 Shanghai–Chongqing Expressway pass through the town, and China National Highway 318 starts in the town.

The town is also close to the Shanghai Hongqiao International Airport.

== Demographics ==
As of 2021, Xujing has a population of 211,590 people. Of these, 40,841 are permanent residents, 150,726 are people coming to Shanghai, and 20,023 are foreign residents.

Xujing has had a significant increase in population in recent history. During the 4th Census in China held in 1990, Xujing had a total population of 25,226, and this increased to 49,816 people in 2000.

== Administrative divisions ==
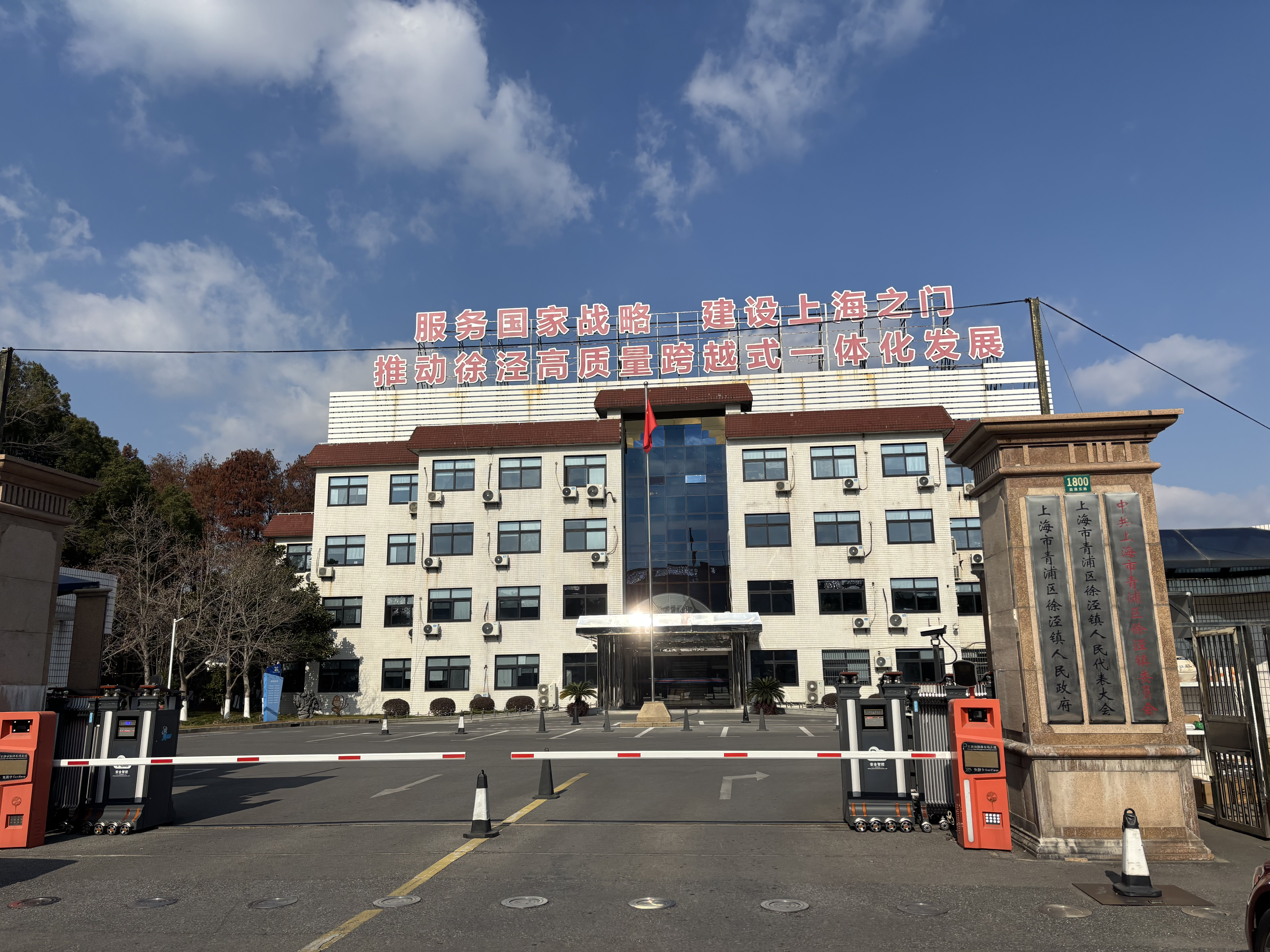
Office building of the People's Government of Xujing Town

As of 2022, Xujing administers the following 5 residents' committees, 23 residential communities, and 9 villages:

- Xujing Residents' Committee (Chinese: 徐泾居委会)
- Longyang Residents' Committee (Chinese: 龙阳居委会)
- Zhaidong Residents' Committee (Chinese: 宅东居委会)
- Jinghua Residents' Committee (Chinese: 京华居委会)
- Panlong Residents' Committee (Chinese: 蟠龙居委会)
- Xu'an First Residential Community (Chinese: 徐安第一社区)
- Xu'an Second Residential Community (Chinese: 徐安第二社区)
- Gaojing Residential Community (Chinese: 高泾社区)
- Weijiajiao First Residential Community (Chinese: 卫家角第一社区)
- Weijiajiao Second Residential Community (Chinese: 卫家角第二社区)
- Xu'an Third Residential Community (Chinese: 徐安第三社区)
- Xu'an Fourth Residential Community (Chinese: 徐安第四社区)
- Yulanqingfan Residential Community (Chinese: 玉兰清苑社区)
- Shangming Road Residential Community (Chinese: 尚鸿路社区)
- Shangtai Road Residential Community (Chinese: 尚泰路社区)
- Shangmao Road Residential Community (Chinese: 尚茂路社区)
- Renhengxijiao Residential Community (Chinese: 仁恒西郊社区)
- Weijiajiao Third Residential Community (Chinese: 卫家角第三社区)
- Mingzhu Road Residential Community (Chinese: 明珠路社区)
- Xiadu Residential Community (Chinese: 夏都社区)
- Yelian Road Residential Community (Chinese: 叶联路社区)
- Panlongxinfan Residential Community (Chinese: 蟠龙馨苑社区)
- Panwen Road Residential Community (Chinese: 蟠文路社区)
- Xuying Road Residential Community (Chinese: 徐盈路社区)
- Zhuguang Road Residential Community (Chinese: 诸光路社区)
- Leguo Road Residential Community (Chinese: 乐国路社区)
- Letian Residential Community (Chinese: 乐天社区)
- Xule Road Residential Community (Chinese: 徐乐路社区)
- Qianming Village (Chinese: 前明村)
- Jinyun Village (Chinese: 金云村)
- Lianmin Village (Chinese: 联民村)
- Guanglian Village (Chinese: 光联村)
- Minzhu Village (Chinese: 民主村)
- Erlian Village (Chinese: 二联村)
- Jinlian Village (Chinese: 金联村)
- Ze'an Village (Chinese: 迮庵村)
- Lujiajiao Village (Chinese: 陆家角村)
