= Zhujiajiao =

Zhujiajiao 朱家角镇
- Town
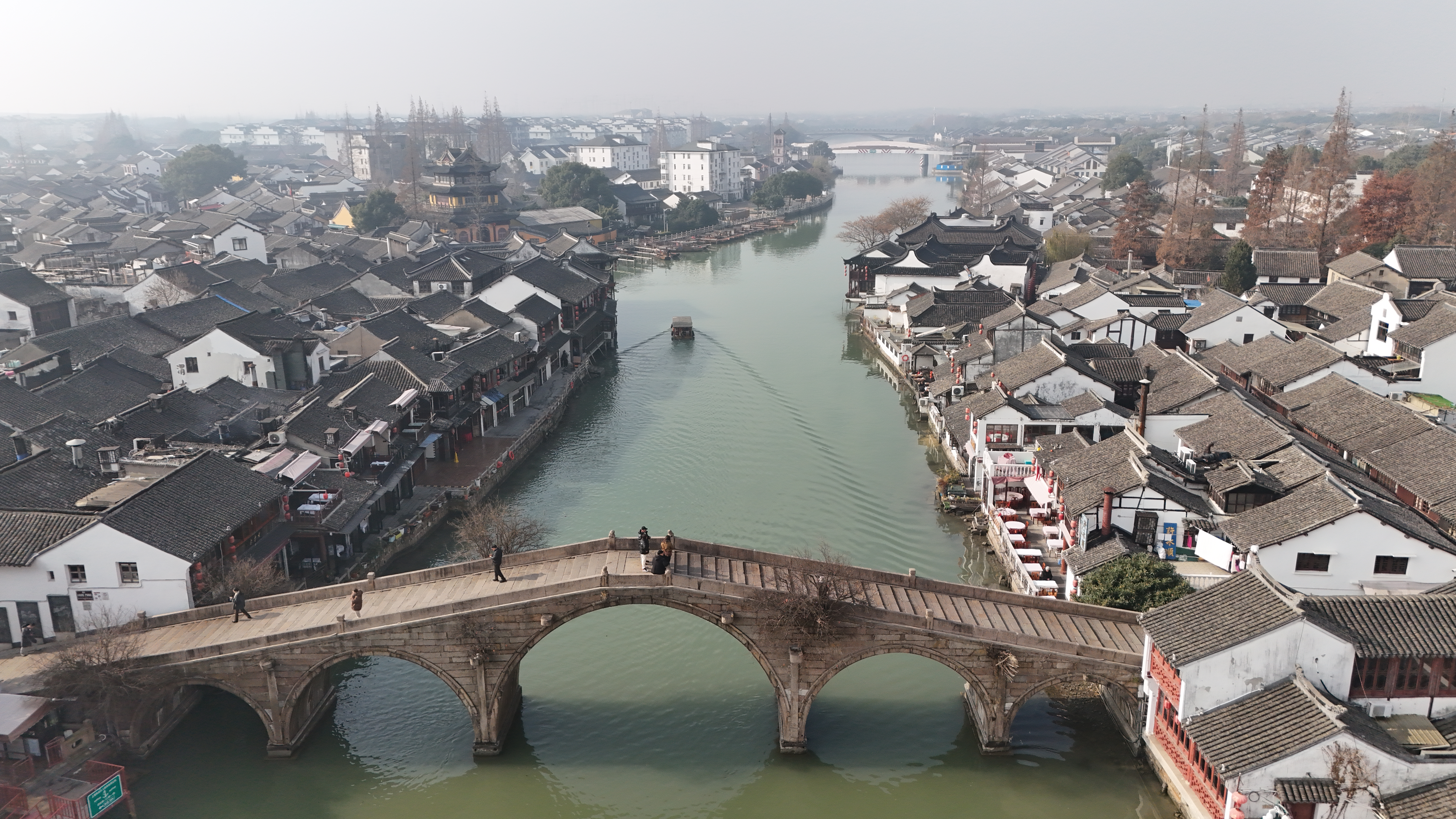
- Zhujiajiao

- Location in Shanghai
- Coordinates: 31°6′46″N 121°3′1″E
- Country: People's Republic of China
- Municipality: Shanghai
- District: Qingpu

Area
  - Land: 136.85 km^{2} (52.84 sq mi)

Population (2017)
  - Total: 95,536
- Time zone: UTC+8 (China Standard)
- Website: https://www.shqp.gov.cn/zhujj/

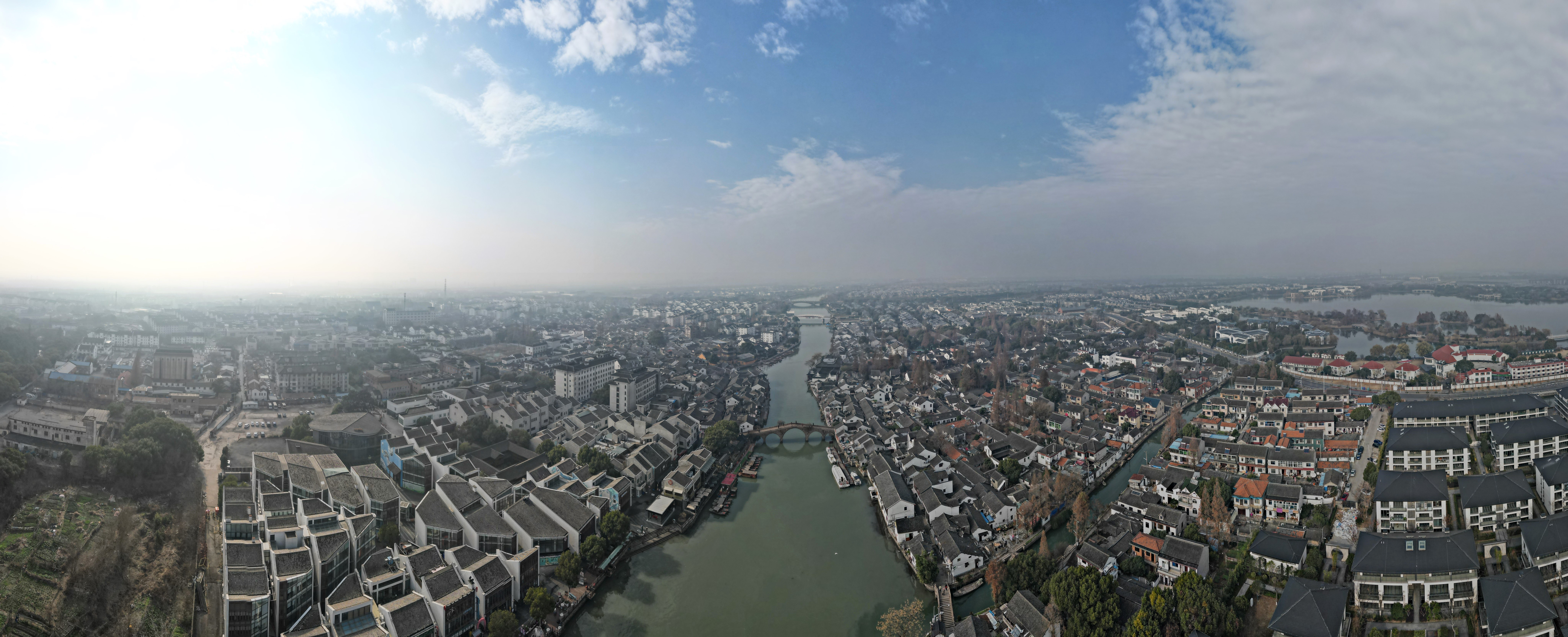
Aerial panorama of Zhujiajiao from above. 27 December 2023.

Zhujiajiao (Chinese: 朱家角; pinyin: Zhūjiājiǎo; lit. 'Zhu Family Corner'; Shanghainese: Chukakoq) is an ancient town located in the Qingpu District of Shanghai. The population of Zhujiajiao is 95,536.

Zhujiajiao is a water town on the outskirts of Shanghai, and was established about 1,700 years ago. Archaeological findings dating back 5,000 years have also been found. 36 stone bridges and numerous rivers line Zhujiajiao, and many ancient buildings still line the riverbanks today.

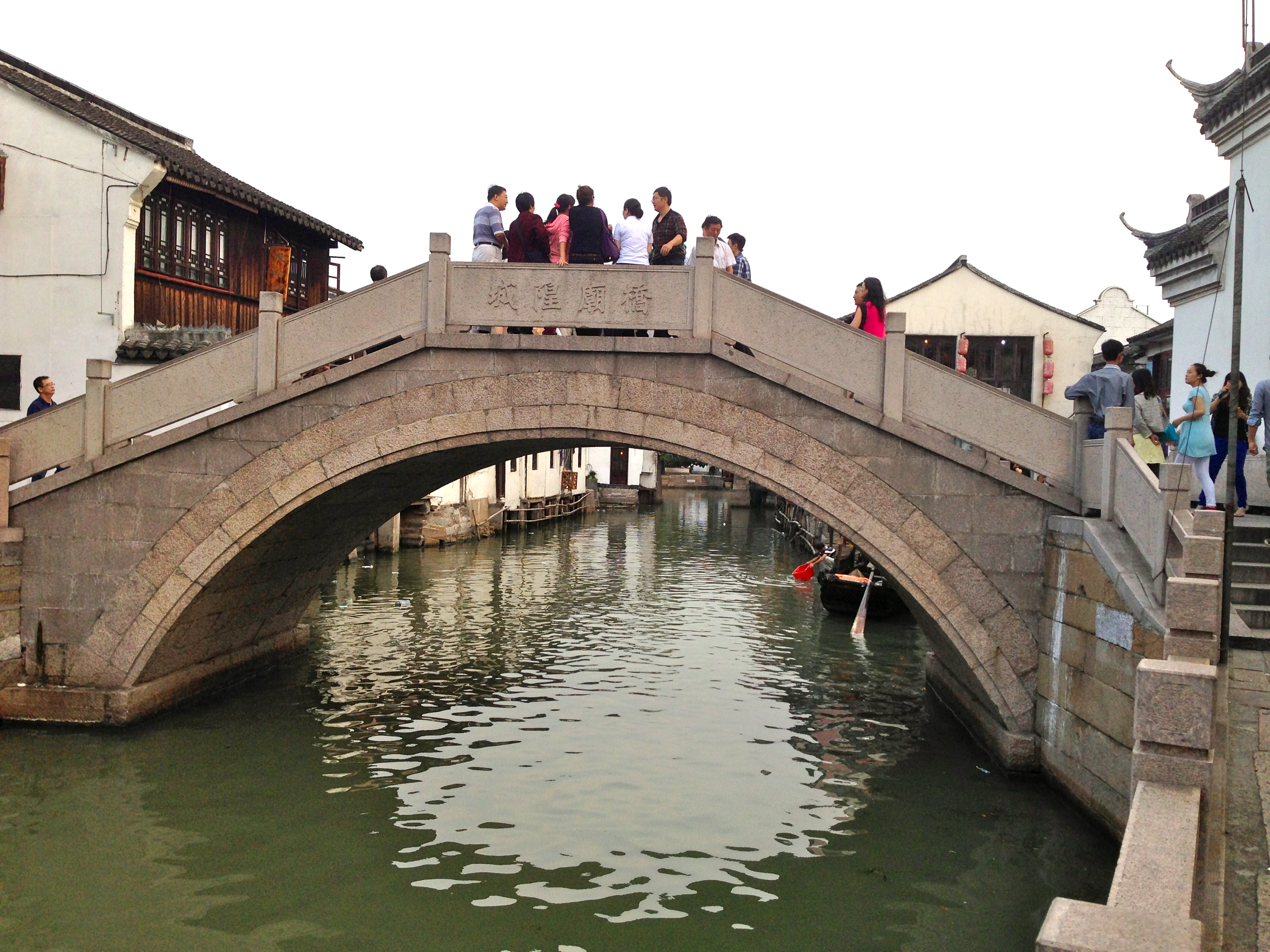
Typical stone bridge in Zhujiajiao

== Historic sights ==
The village prospered through clothing and rice businesses. Today, old historical buildings such as rice shops, banks, spice stores and even a Qing dynasty post office can still be found.

Zhujiajiao has many sights of historic interest, such as Fangsheng Bridge, Kezhi Garden and the Yuanjin Buddhist Temple.

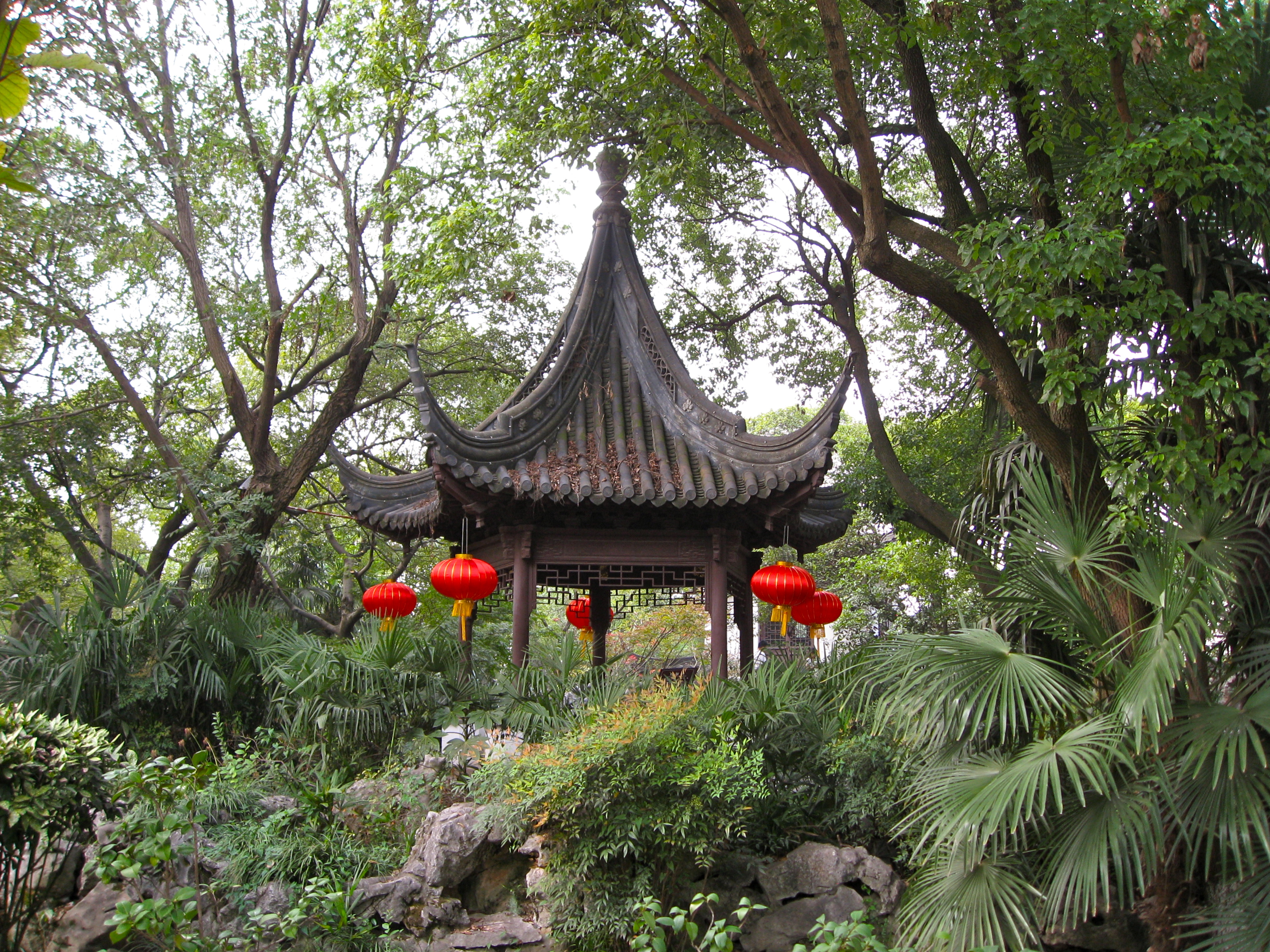
Upside Down Lion Pavilion in Kezhi Garden

However, recent overdevelopment threatens the village's authenticity - most notably the current (since 2012) conversion of its people's square into shops and the large-scale shopping and entertainment complexes being constructed in and around the Old Town.

== Cuisine ==
The town is also famous for its cuisine, particularly green soy beans, Zarou, lotus roots and other foods.

== Transportation ==
Because of its large number of waterways, much of Zhujiajiao's transport is by boat. Zhujiajiao is within walking distance of Zhujiajiao station on Line 17 of the Shanghai Metro.

== Gallery ==
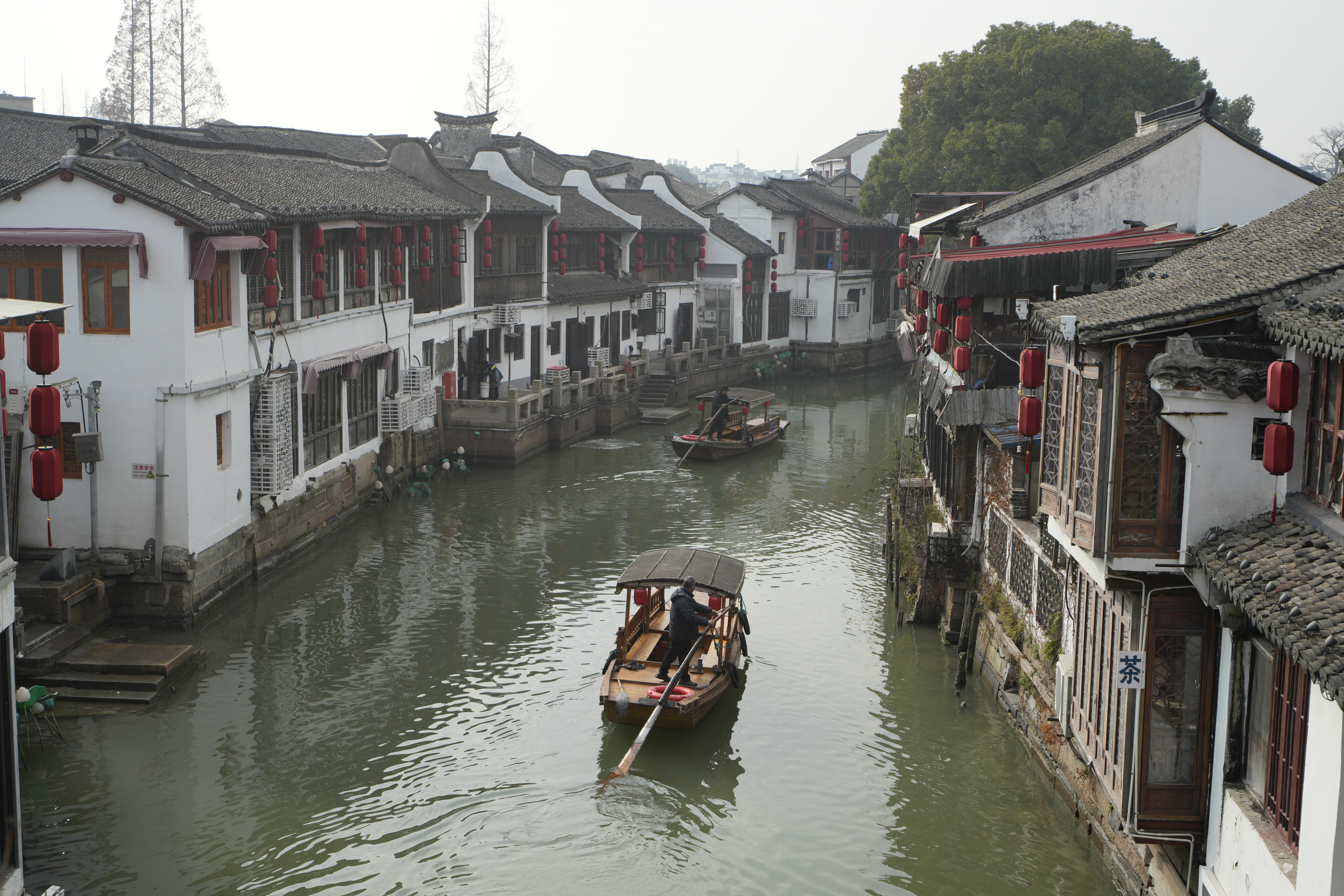

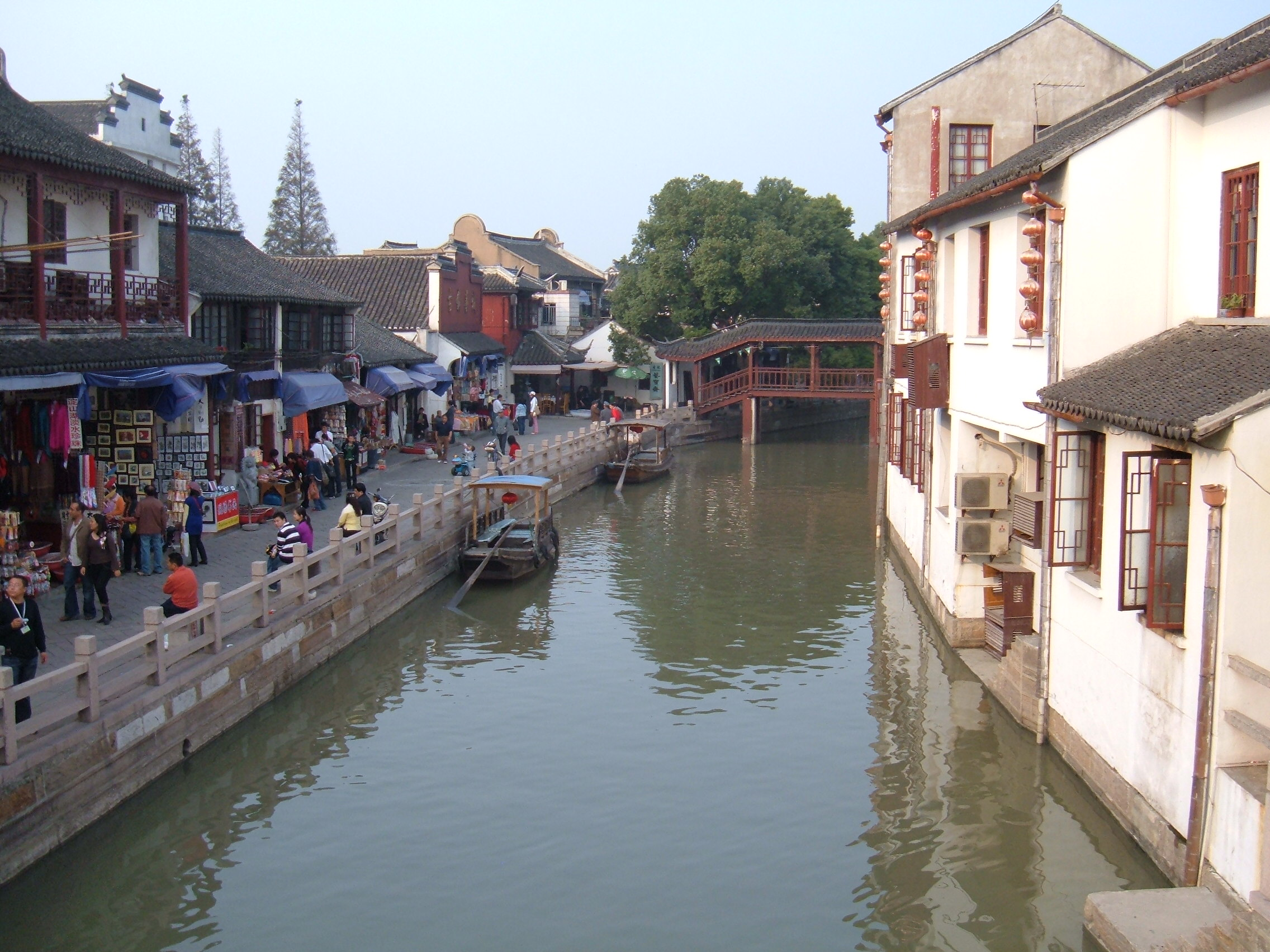

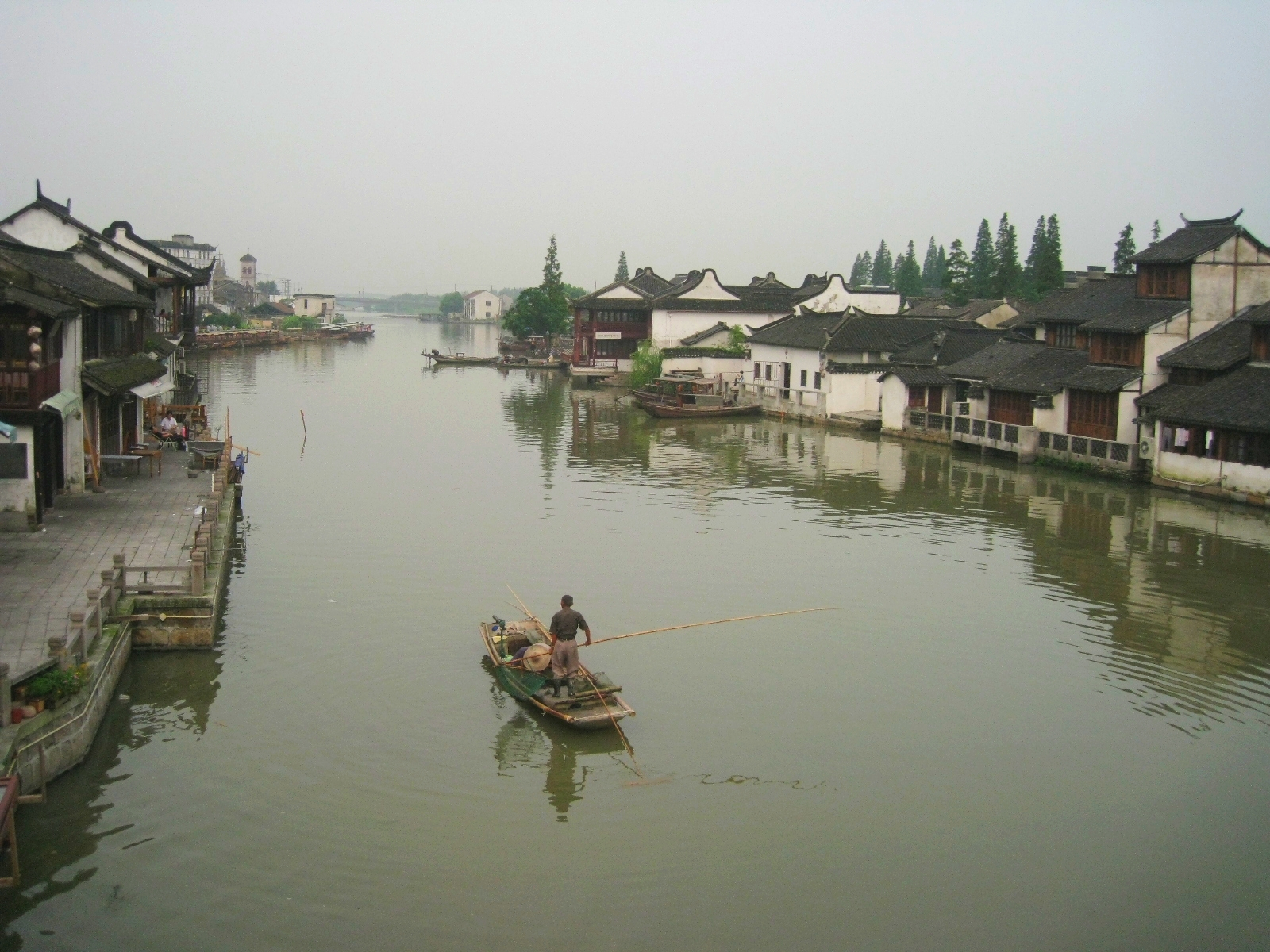

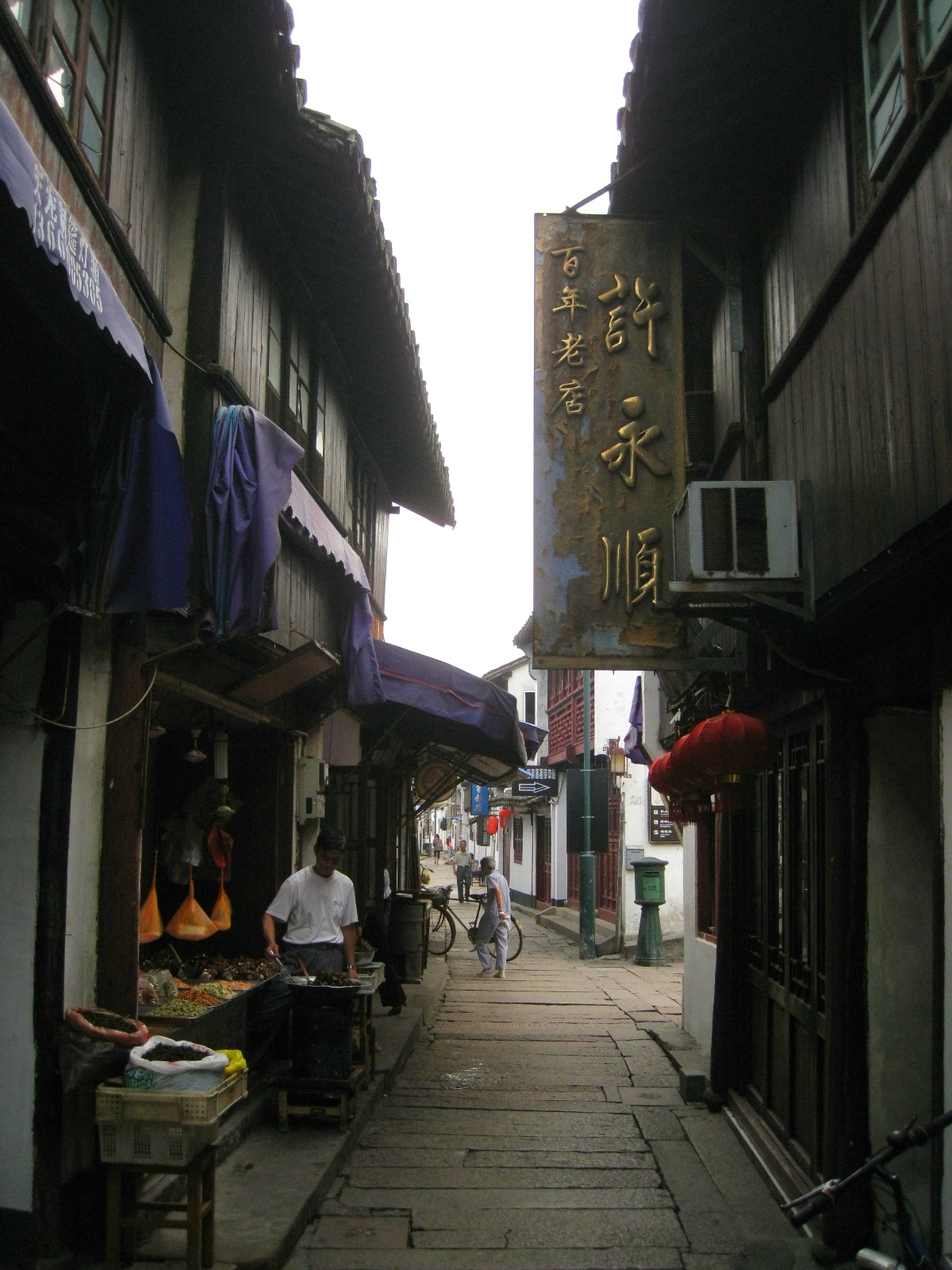

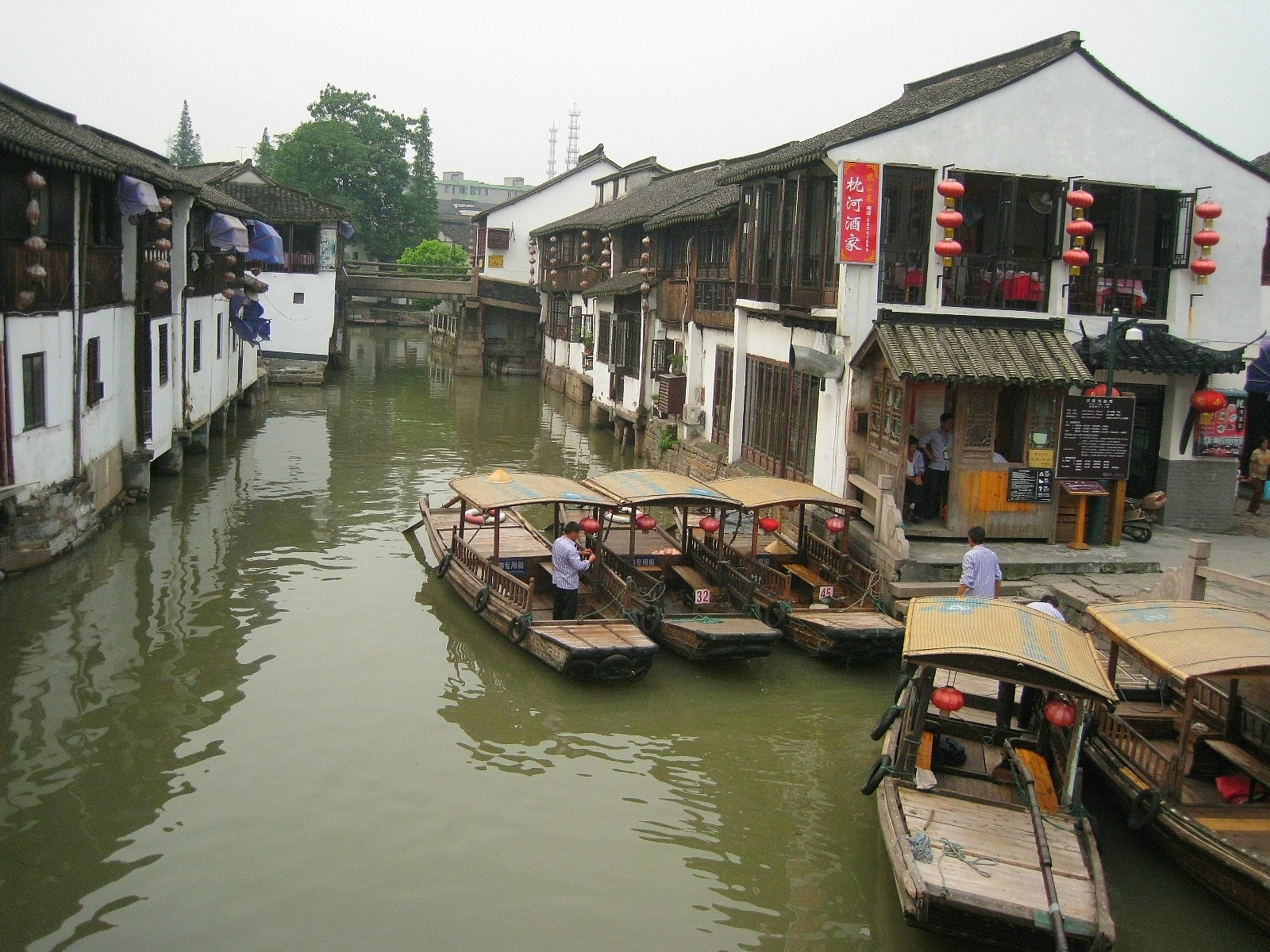

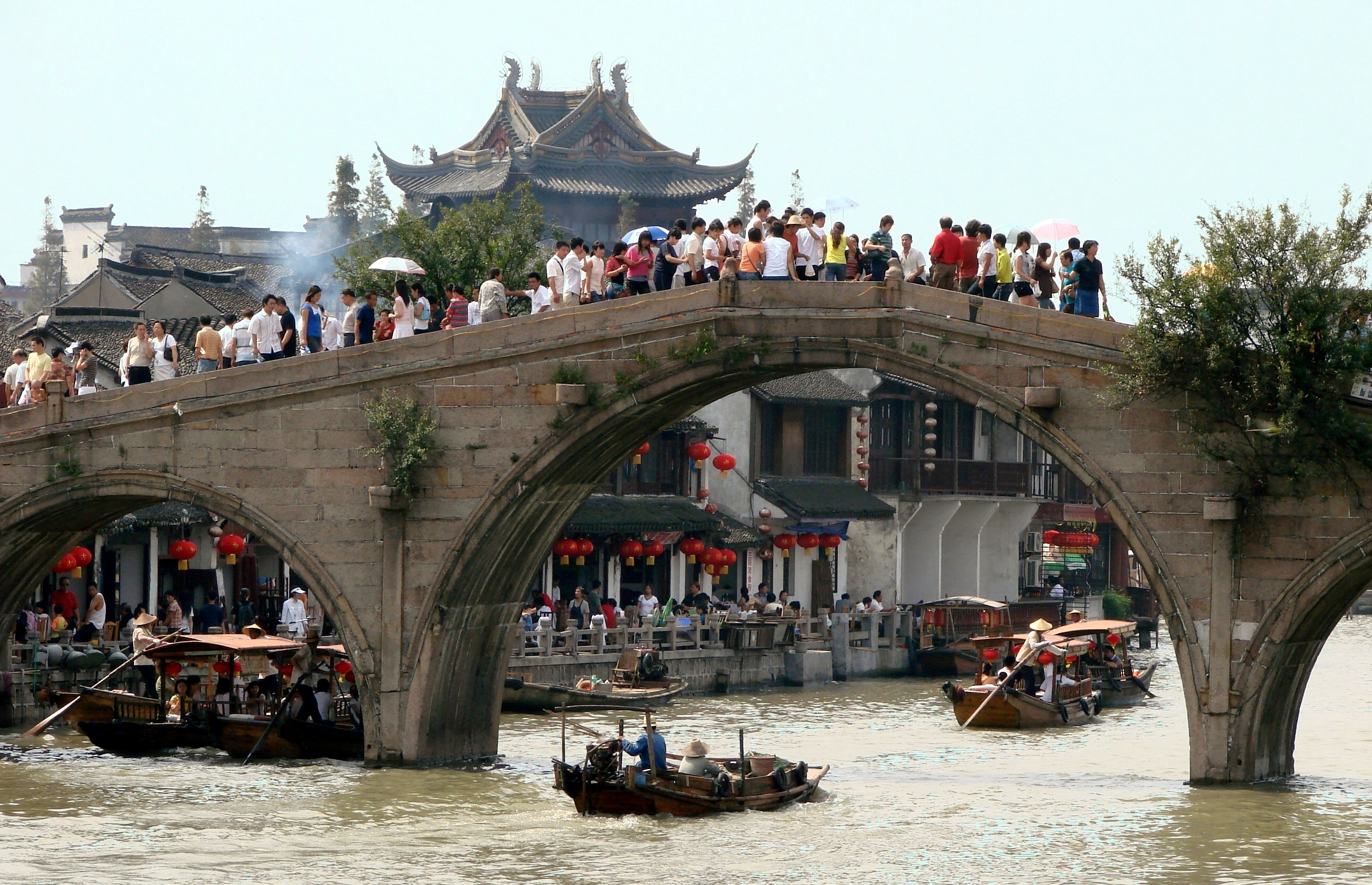
