= Qingpu, Shanghai =

Qingpu 青浦区; 青浦區 Tsingpu
- District
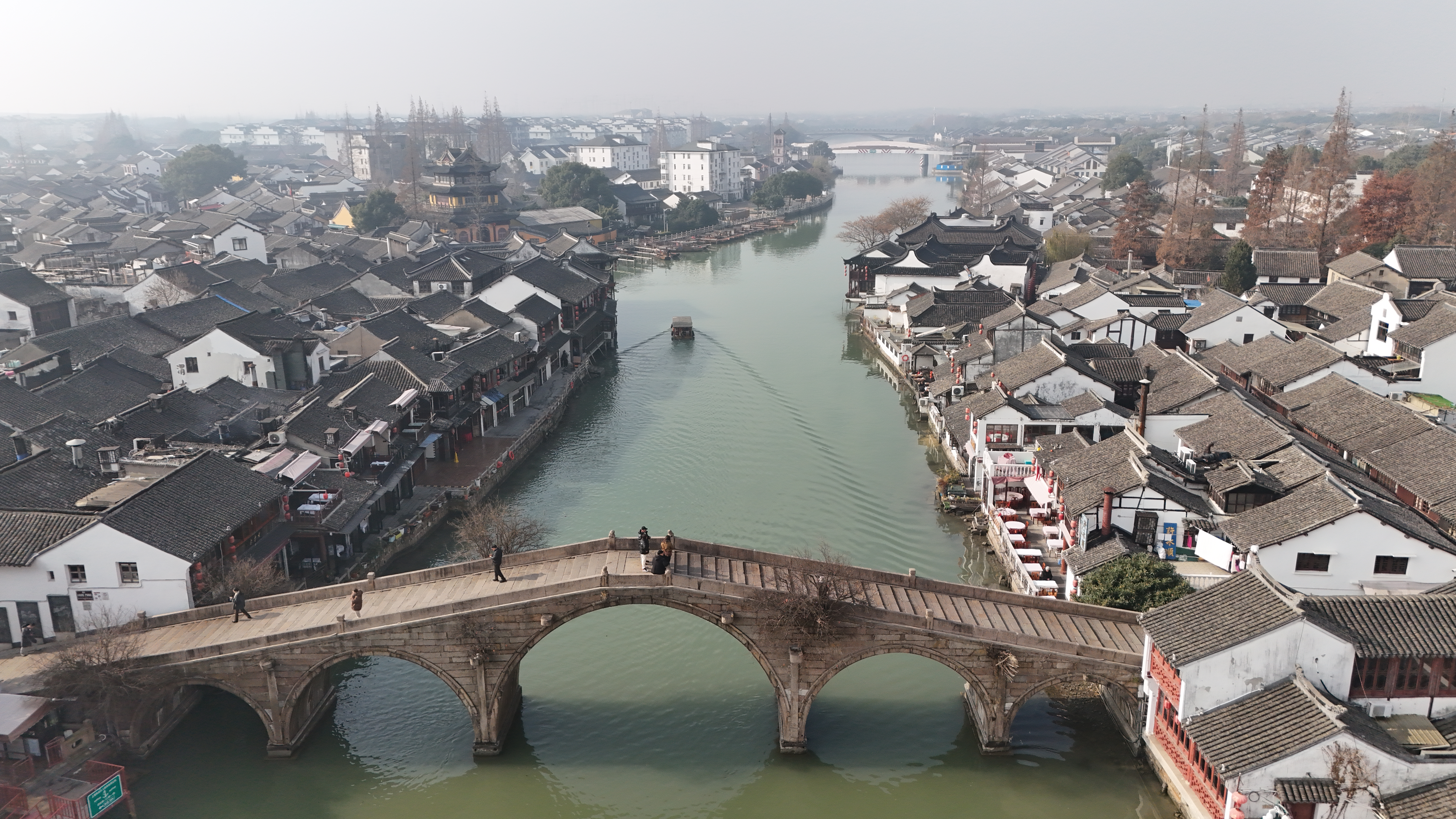
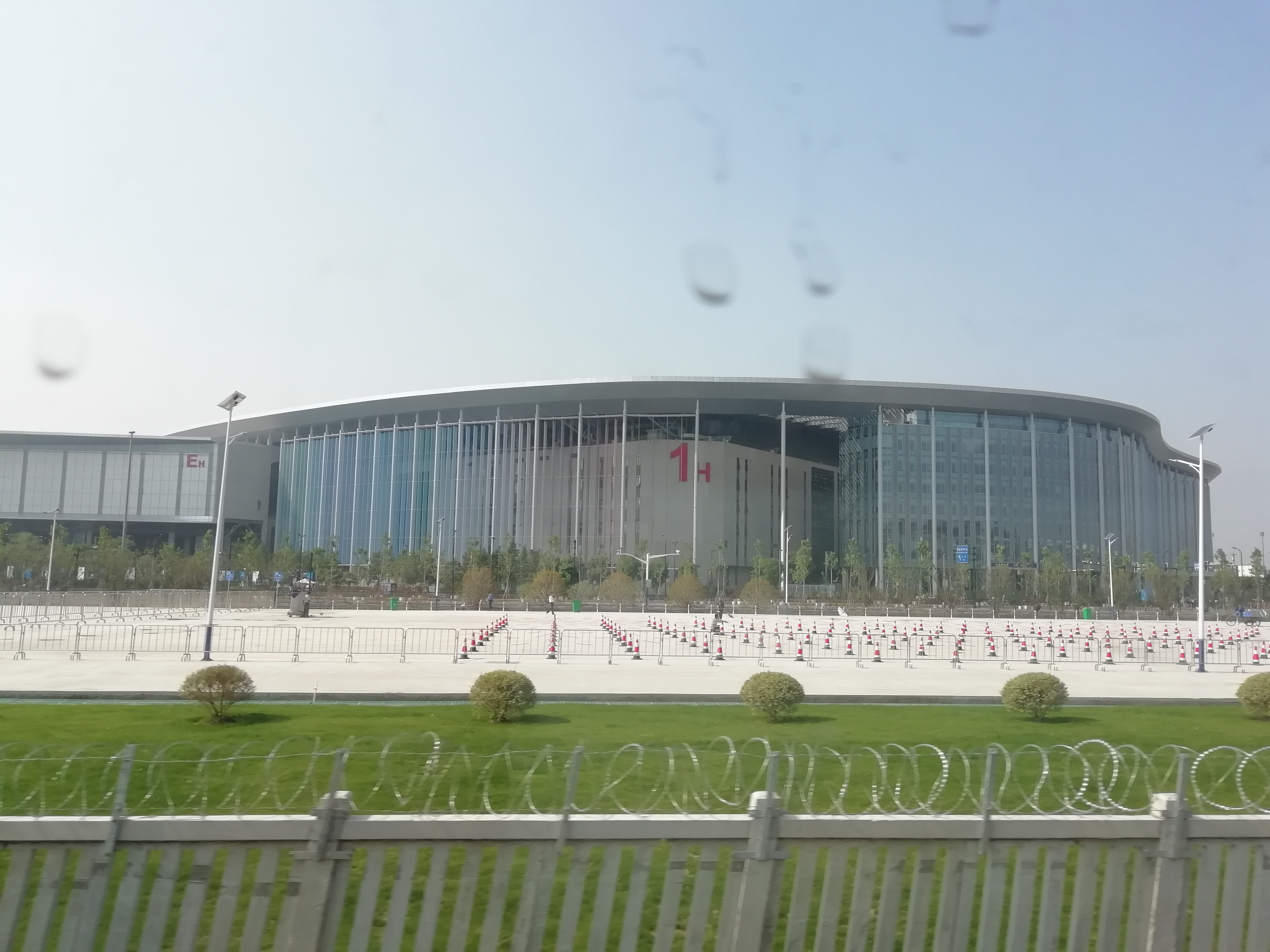
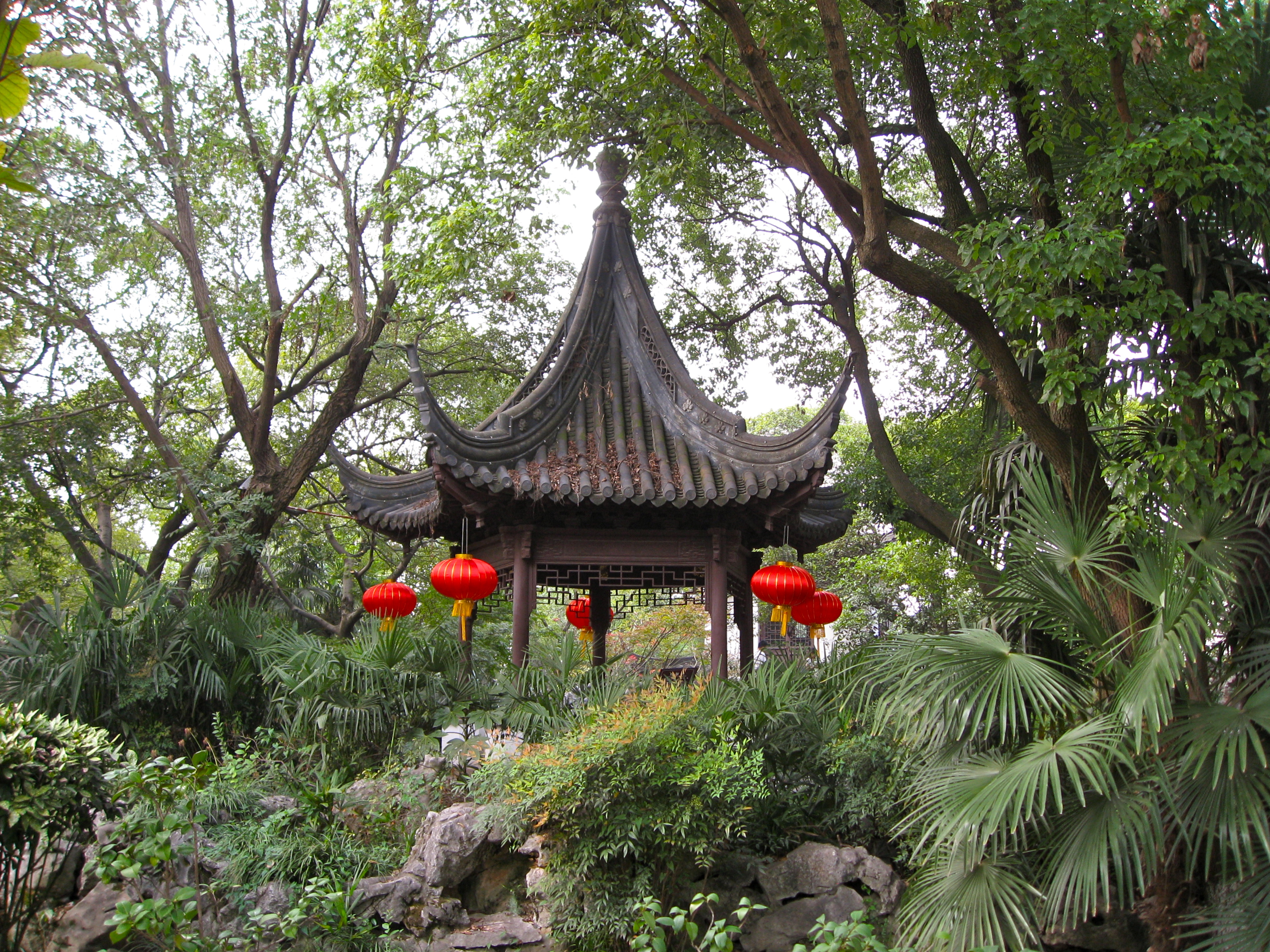
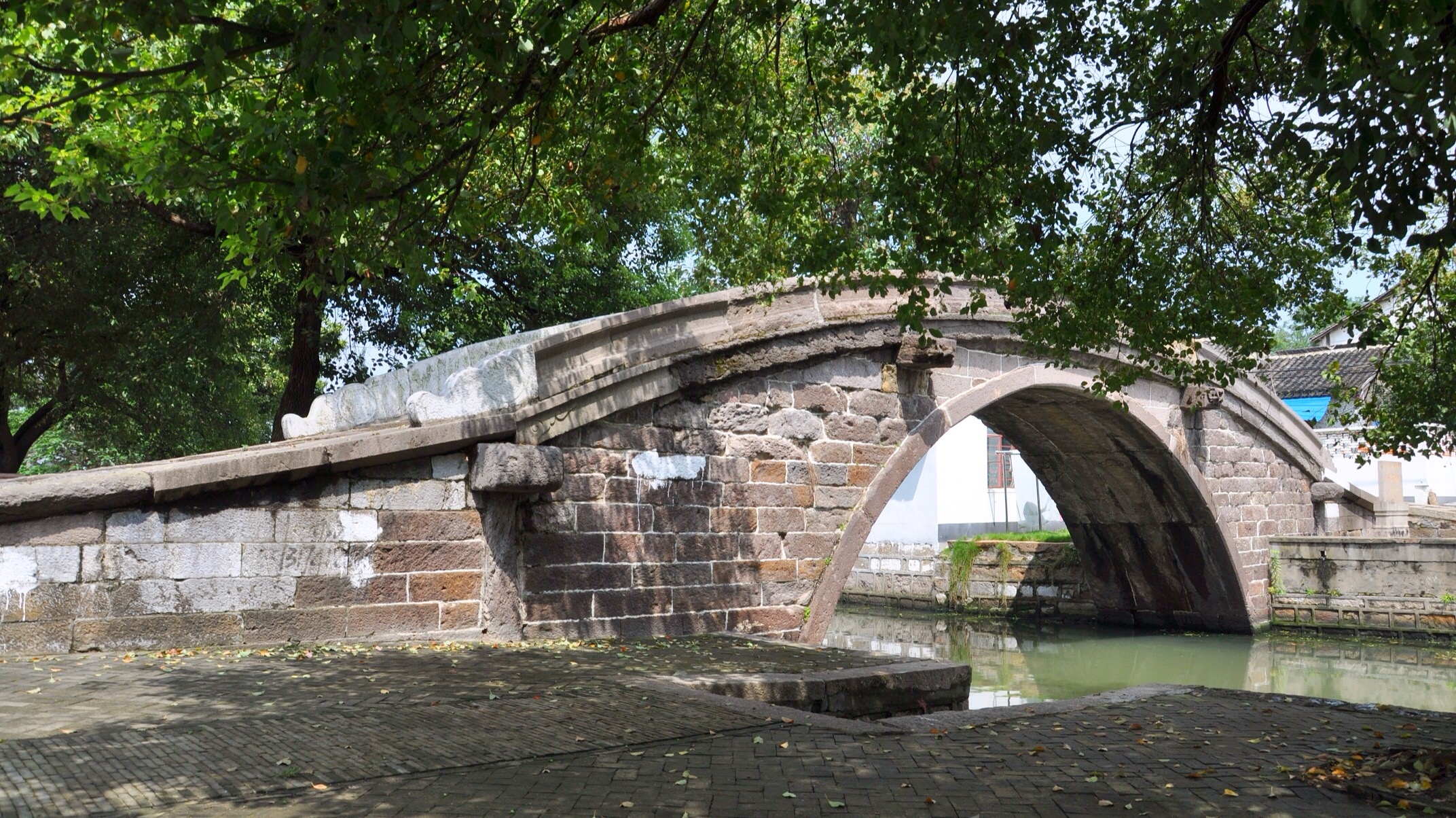
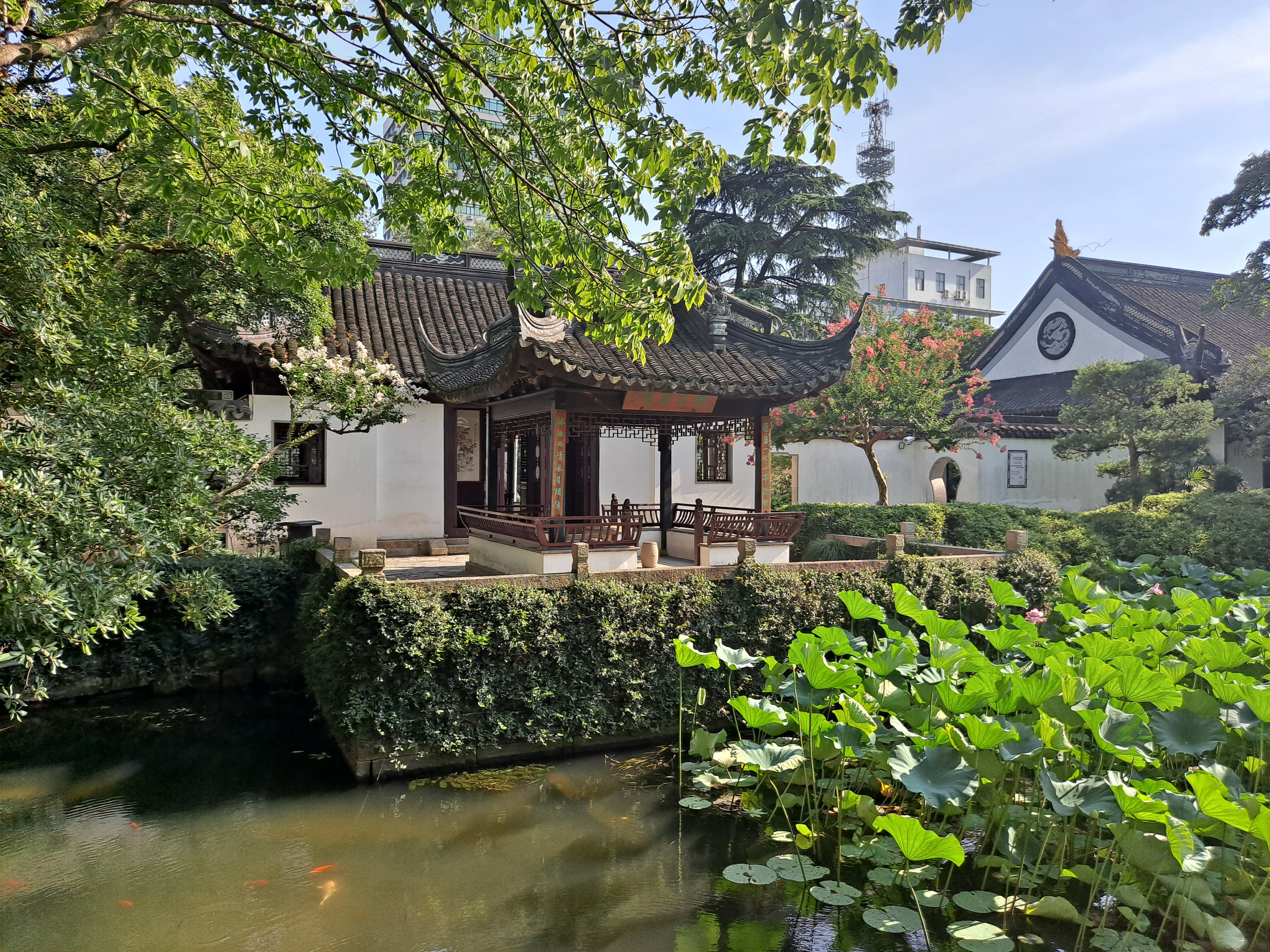
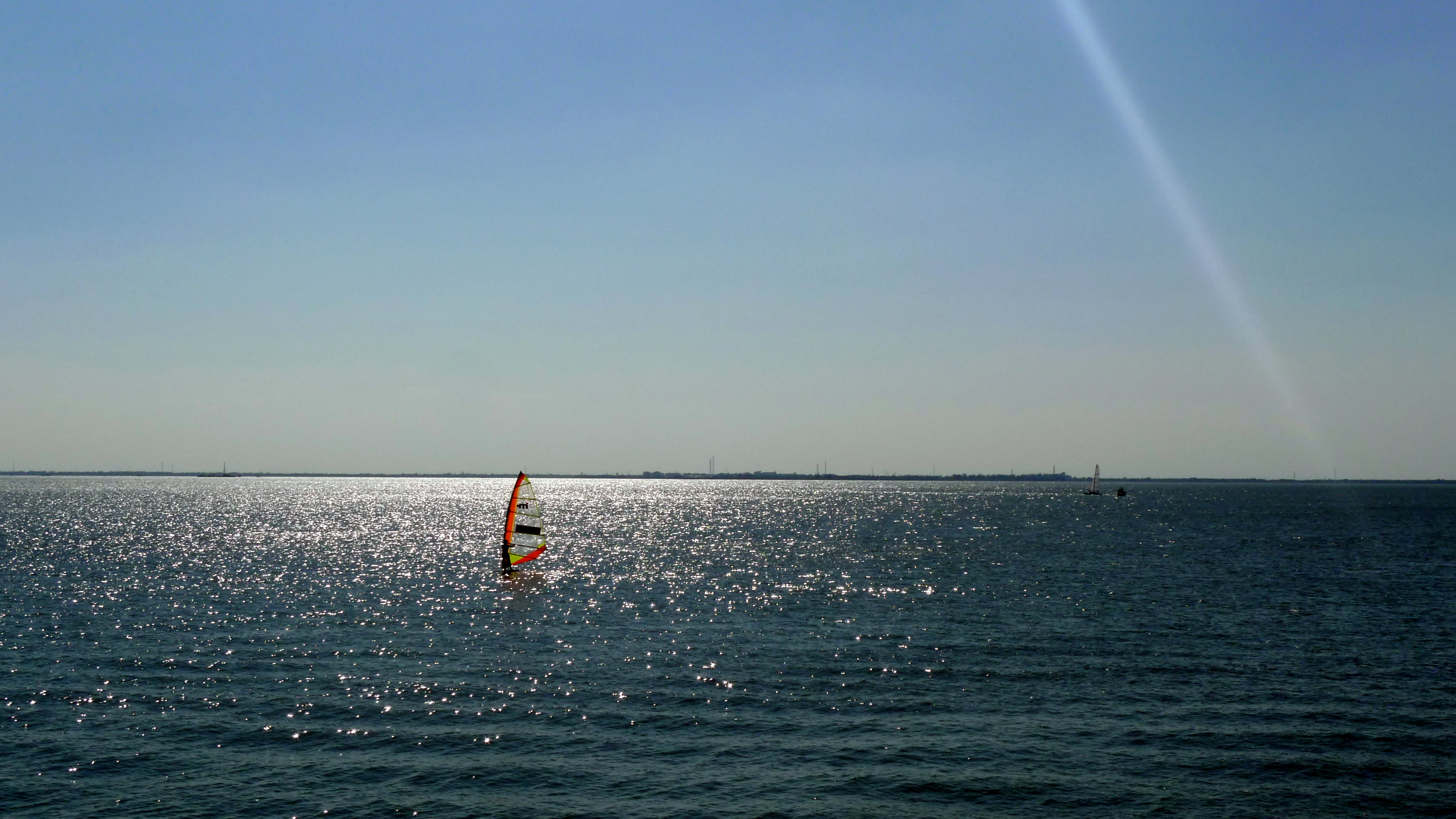
- Zhujiajiao Ancient Town National Exhibition and Convention Center Kezhi Garden Puji Bridge in Jinze Qushui Garden Dianshan Lake

- Qingpu District in Shanghai Municipality
- Coordinates (Qingpu District government): 31°09′03″N 121°07′26″E
- Country: People's Republic of China
- Municipality: Shanghai

Area
  - Total: 675.11 km^{2} (260.66 sq mi)

Population (2020 Census)
  - Total: 1,271,424
  - Density: 1,883.3/km^{2} (4,877.7/sq mi)
- Time zone: UTC+8 (China Standard)

Qingpu, Shanghai
- Simplified Chinese: 青浦区
- Traditional Chinese: 青浦區
- Wugniu: tshin^{1} phu^{3} chiu^{1}
- Postal: Tsingpu
Transcriptions
Standard Mandarin
- Hanyu Pinyin: Qīngpǔ Qū
Wu
- Wugniu: tshin^{1} phu^{3} chiu^{1}
- IPA: Shanghainese: [tɕʰin˥ pʰu˧ tɕʰy˨]
Yue: Cantonese
- Jyutping: cing^{1} pou^{2} keoi^{1}

Qingpu District is a suburban district of Shanghai Municipality. Lake Dianshan is located in Qingpu.

The population of Qingpu was counted at 1,271,424 people in the 2020 Census. It has an area of 675.11 km^{2} (260.66 sq mi).

Qingpu District is the westernmost district of Shanghai Municipality; it is adjacent to Jiangsu and Zhejiang Provinces. Around the lake are a number of tourist scenic areas, all complete in tourist facilities. Among the tourist areas is the waterside town Zhujiajiao, a major tourist destination in the Shanghai region.

There are currently 21 domestic travel services, three international travel business departments, 14 star-rated hotels, and 3 AAAA-grade tourist spots in Qingpu District.

== Transport ==
- Line 17 (Shanghai Metro)
- China National Highway 318

== Tourism ==
Qingpu's tourist attractions include the Zhujiajiao Ancient Town, Oriental Land, Jinze Ancient Town, Lake Dianshan, and the Qushui Garden.

== Economy ==
The China offices of Oishi are located here.

== Culture ==
Baihe, the oldest town in Qingpu District, is famous for its performances of Shanghai opera.

== Government ==
Qingpu Prison is in the district. The government of Qingpu:https://www.shqp.gov.cn/shqp/index.html

== Education ==
The French School of Shanghai Qingpu Campus and the German School of Shanghai both share the EuroCampus (Chinese: 欧洲校园; pinyin: Ōuzhōu Xiàoyuán) in Qingpu District.

The International Philippine School of Shanghai (IPSS) is also in Qingpu District.

The Shanghai Business and Information College (SBIC) (Chinese: 上海工商信息学校) is located at No. 2025 Park East Road, Qingpu District.

== Notable residents ==
- Chen Yun, an important cadre in the Deng Xiaoping era, was born here.
- Gao Kang, District Governor

== Subdistricts and towns ==
Qingpu District has three subdistricts and eight towns.

Name	Chinese (S)	Hanyu Pinyin	Shanghainese Romanization	Population (2010)	Area (km^{2})
Xianghuaqiao Subdistrict	香花桥街道	Xiānghuāqiáo Jiēdào	xian hau djio ka do	106,830	69.45
Xiayang Subdistrict	夏阳街道	Xiàyáng Jiēdào	rau yan ka do	137,321	28.05
Yingpu Subdistrict	盈浦街道	Yíngpǔ Jiēdào	yin phu ka do	118,708	25.14
Baihe town	白鹤镇	Báihè Zhèn	baq ngoq tzen	92,288	58.49
Chonggu town	重固镇	Zhònggù Zhèn	dzon ku tzen	39,756	23.28
Huaxin town	华新镇	Huáxīn Zhèn	rau sin tzen	153,203	47.60
Jinze town	金泽镇	Jīnzé Zhèn	cin dzeq tzen	67,735	108.49
Liantang town	练塘镇	Liàntáng Zhèn	li daon tzen	68,485	93.66
Xujing town	徐泾镇	Xújīng Zhèn	zi cin tzen	127,936	38.59
Zhaoxiang town	赵巷镇	Zhàoxiàng Zhèn	dzo raon tzen	74,409	36.35
Zhujiajiao town	朱家角镇	Zhūjiājiǎo Zhèn	tzyu ka koq tzen	94,351	138.00

== Climate ==
Climate data for Qingpu District, elevation 4 m (13 ft), (1991–2020 normals, extremes 1951–present)
Month	Jan	Feb	Mar	Apr	May	Jun	Jul	Aug	Sep	Oct	Nov	Dec	Year
Record high °C (°F)	21.6 (70.9)	26.8 (80.2)	32.7 (90.9)	33.5 (92.3)	38.0 (100.4)	37.1 (98.8)	40.3 (104.5)	40.9 (105.6)	37.4 (99.3)	36.1 (97.0)	30.0 (86.0)	24.4 (75.9)	40.9 (105.6)
Mean daily maximum °C (°F)	8.4 (47.1)	10.5 (50.9)	14.7 (58.5)	20.6 (69.1)	25.6 (78.1)	28.3 (82.9)	32.7 (90.9)	32.2 (90.0)	28.3 (82.9)	23.3 (73.9)	17.6 (63.7)	11.1 (52.0)	21.1 (70.0)
Daily mean °C (°F)	4.5 (40.1)	6.2 (43.2)	10.1 (50.2)	15.6 (60.1)	20.8 (69.4)	24.3 (75.7)	28.6 (83.5)	28.3 (82.9)	24.3 (75.7)	18.9 (66.0)	13.1 (55.6)	6.8 (44.2)	16.8 (62.2)
Mean daily minimum °C (°F)	1.4 (34.5)	2.8 (37.0)	6.4 (43.5)	11.5 (52.7)	16.8 (62.2)	21.3 (70.3)	25.4 (77.7)	25.3 (77.5)	21.2 (70.2)	15.4 (59.7)	9.5 (49.1)	3.4 (38.1)	13.4 (56.0)
Record low °C (°F)	−10.0 (14.0)	−7.8 (18.0)	−4.0 (24.8)	−1.3 (29.7)	6.5 (43.7)	13.1 (55.6)	16.8 (62.2)	18.2 (64.8)	12.9 (55.2)	3.5 (38.3)	−3.0 (26.6)	−7.8 (18.0)	−10.0 (14.0)
Average precipitation mm (inches)	70.8 (2.79)	64.4 (2.54)	94.1 (3.70)	80.7 (3.18)	92.8 (3.65)	205.9 (8.11)	146.5 (5.77)	153.1 (6.03)	97.5 (3.84)	65.0 (2.56)	55.6 (2.19)	46.8 (1.84)	1,173.2 (46.2)
Average precipitation days (≥ 0.1 mm)	10.8	10.6	13.0	11.9	11.4	14.6	11.7	12.1	9.8	7.5	9.0	8.4	130.8
Average snowy days	2.4	1.4	0.4	0	0	0	0	0	0	0	0.1	0.8	5.1
Average relative humidity (%)	75	74	73	73	74	80	78	79	78	75	76	73	76
Mean monthly sunshine hours	101.4	109.1	130.0	153.9	162.7	116.3	193.1	189.4	154.5	148.1	120.3	120.3	1,699.1
Percentage possible sunshine	32	35	35	40	38	27	45	46	42	42	38	38	38
Source: China Meteorological Administration All-time October high
