= Caoying Road station =

Shanghai Metro station

Caoying Road 漕盈路
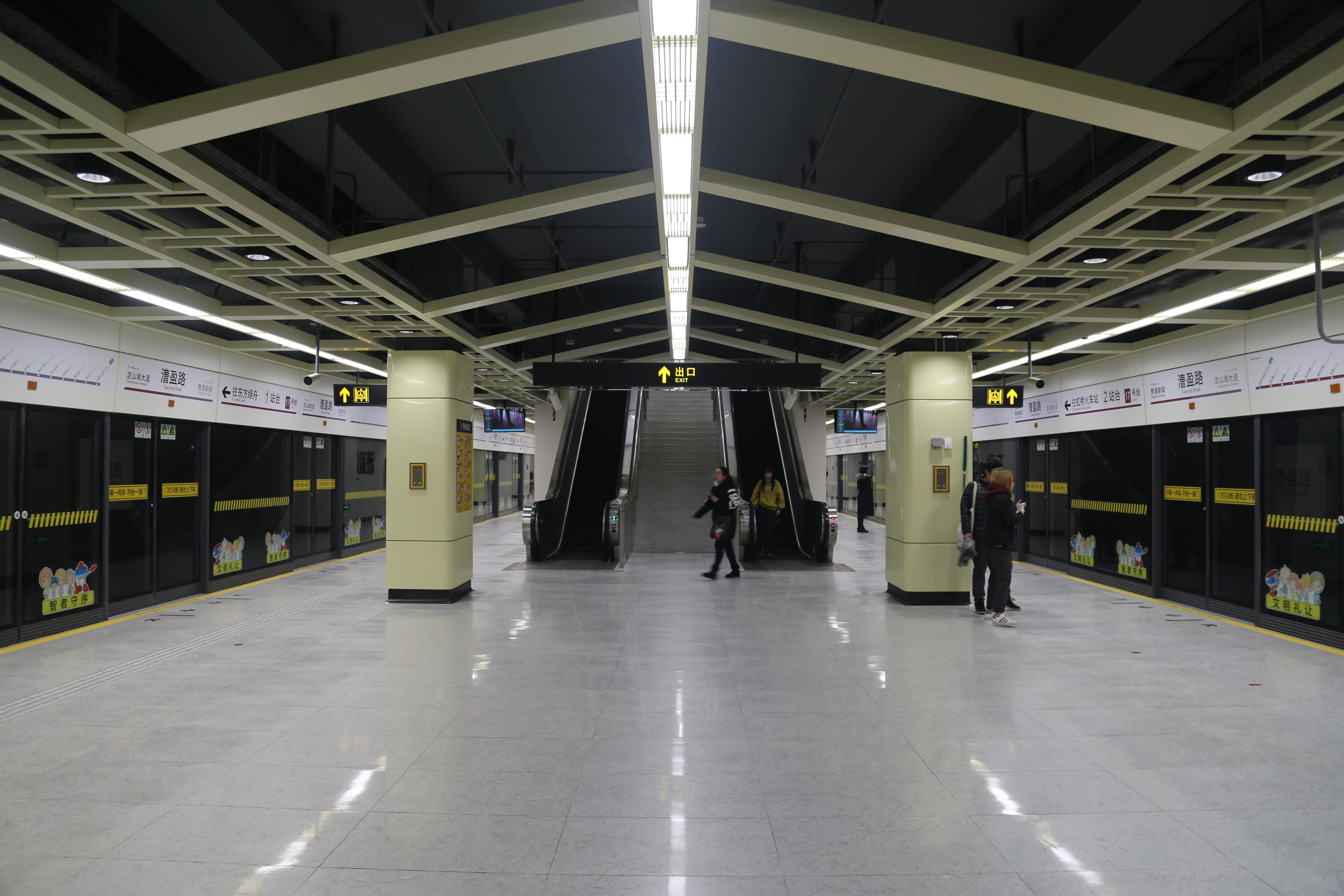
- Station platform

General information
- Location: Yinggang Road and Caoying Road, Qingpu District, Shanghai; China
- Coordinates: 31.162284°N 121.091737°E
- Operator: Shanghai No. 2 Metro Operation Co. Ltd.
- Line: Line 17
- Platforms: 2 (1 island platform)
- Tracks: 2

Construction
- Structure type: Underground
- Accessible: Yes

History
- Opened: 30 December 2017

Services
Preceding station	Shanghai Metro	Following station
Dianshanhu Avenue towards Xicen	Line 17	Qingpu Xincheng towards Hongqiao Railway Station
Location
- Location within Shanghai

Caoying Road (Chinese: 漕盈路; pinyin: Cáoyíng Lù) is a station on Line 17 of the Shanghai Metro. The station is located at the intersection of Yinggang Road at Caoying Road in the city's Qingpu District, between Qingpu Xincheng and Dianshanhu Avenue. It opened with the rest of Line 17 on 30 December 2017.

== History ==
The station opened for passenger trial operation on 30 December 2017, concurrent with the opening of the rest of Line 17.

== Description ==
Located at the intersection of Yanggang Road and Caoying Road in the Qingpu District of Shanghai, Caoying Road station serves as a major transportation hub for the area. It is located near the Yinggang Coach Terminal (simplified Chinese: 盈港客运站; traditional Chinese: 盈港客運站; pinyin: Yínggǎng Kèyùn Zhàn), which formerly served as a major bus terminal with local and intercity connections. However, with the opening of the metro station, many services were relocated to a bus terminal directly adjacent to the station.

An underground structure, the station's concourse, located one level below the street, can be accessed from three entrances. The concourse has a customer service counter, fare gates, and ticket machines. The platform level consists of an island platform, with toilets located on the platform's west end. Like all stations on Line 17, Caoying Road station is fully accessible. An elevator connects the street level to the concourse near Exit 3, while another connects the concourse to the platform within the fare-paid zone.

=== Exits ===
The station has three exits:

- Exit 1: Yinggang Road
- Exit 2: Yinggang Road, Caoying Road
- Exit 3: Caoying Road, Caoying Highway
