= Dianshanhu Avenue station =

Shanghai Metro station

Dianshanhu Avenue 淀山湖大道
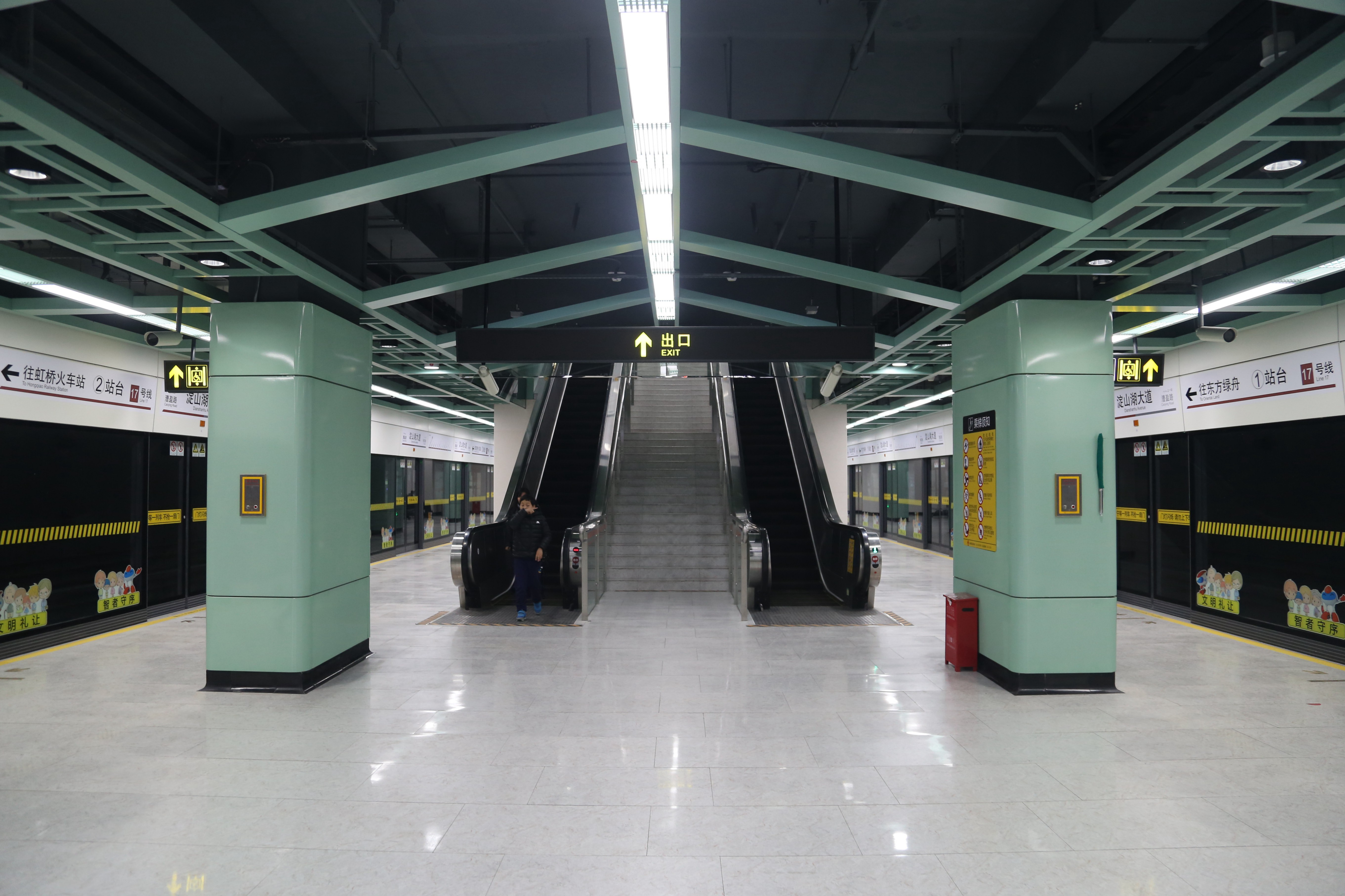
- Station platform

General information
- Location: Huangnilou Road and Dianshanhu Avenue, Qingpu District, Shanghai; China
- Coordinates: 31.135891°N 121.076337°E
- Operator: Shanghai No. 2 Metro Operation Co. Ltd.
- Line: Line 17
- Platforms: 2 (1 island platform)
- Tracks: 2

Construction
- Structure type: Underground
- Accessible: Yes

History
- Opened: 30 December 2017

Services
Preceding station	Shanghai Metro	Following station
Zhujiajiao towards Xicen	Line 17	Caoying Road towards Hongqiao Railway Station
Location
- Location within Shanghai

Dianshanhu Avenue (Chinese: 淀山湖大道; pinyin: Diànshānhú Dàdào) is a station on Line 17 of the Shanghai Metro. The station is located at the intersection of Huangnilou Road and Dianshanhu Avenue in the city's Qingpu District, between Caoying Road and Zhujiajiao. It opened with the rest of Line 17 on 30 December 2017.

== History ==
The station opened for passenger trial operation on 30 December 2017, concurrent with the opening of the rest of Line 17.

== Description ==
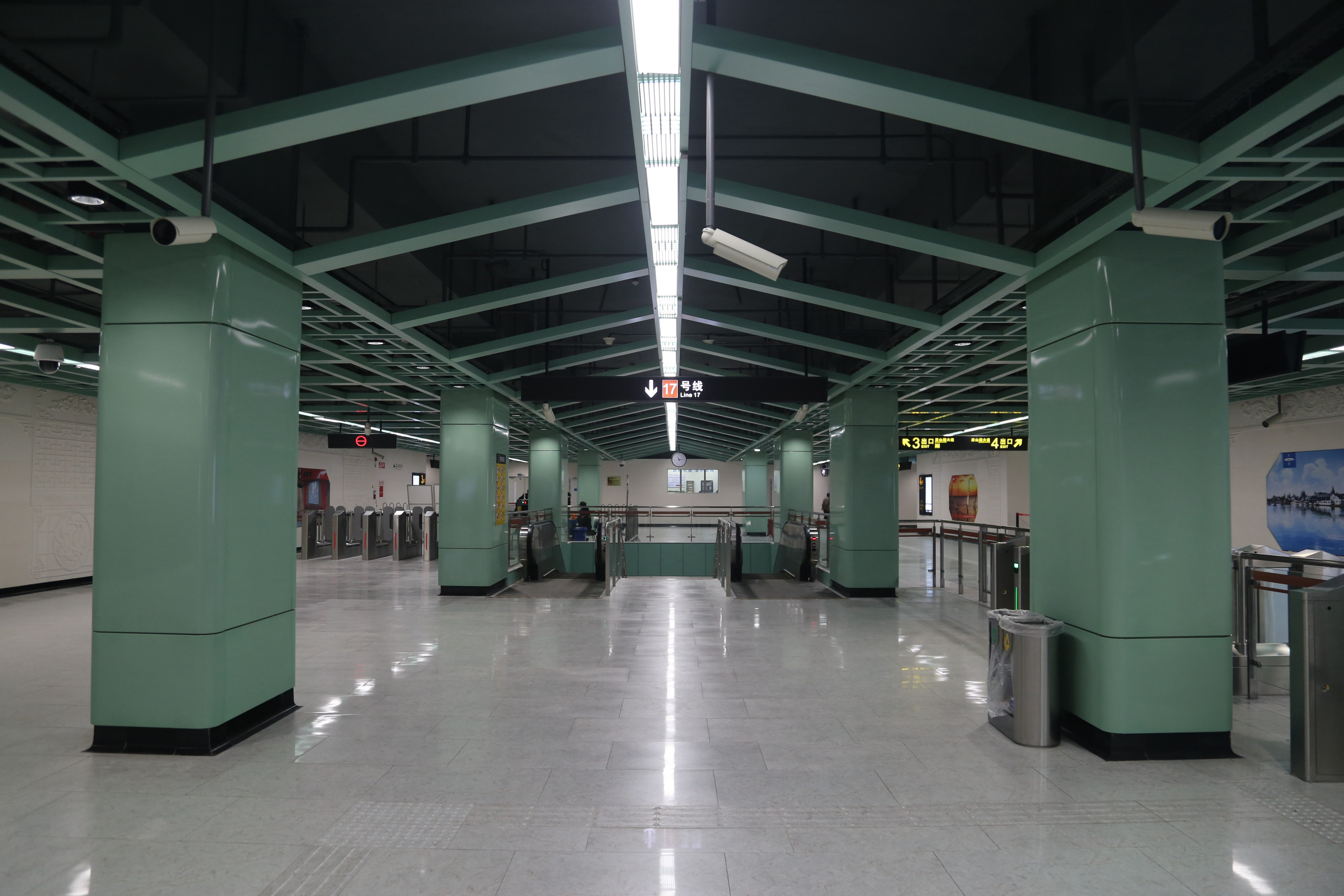
Station concourse

The station is located at the intersection of Huangnilou Road and Dianshanhu Avenue in the Qingpu District of Shanghai. An underground structure, the station contains two levels: a concourse level with four exits to street level, fare gates, and a customer service counter, and a platform level beneath the concourse level, with a single island platform and toilets. Like all stations on Line 17, Dianshanhu Avenue station is fully accessible. An elevator connects the street level to the concourse near Exit 3, while another connects the concourse to the platform within the fare-paid zone.

Dianshanhu Avenue station serves as the western terminus for some weekday rush-hour trains. During the weekday rush-hour period, two service patterns are operated along Line 17: one which serves all stops along the entire line, and another short-turn service which serves all stations between Dianshanhu Avenue and Hongqiao Railway Station only. At all other times, a single Line 17 service which makes all stops is operated.

=== Exits ===
The station has four exits:

- Exit 1: Dianshanhu Avenue
- Exit 2: Dianshanhu Avenue
- Exit 3: Dianshanhu Avenue
- Exit 4: Dianshanhu Avenue, Huangnilou Road
