= Huijin Road station =

Shanghai Metro station

Huijin Road 汇金路
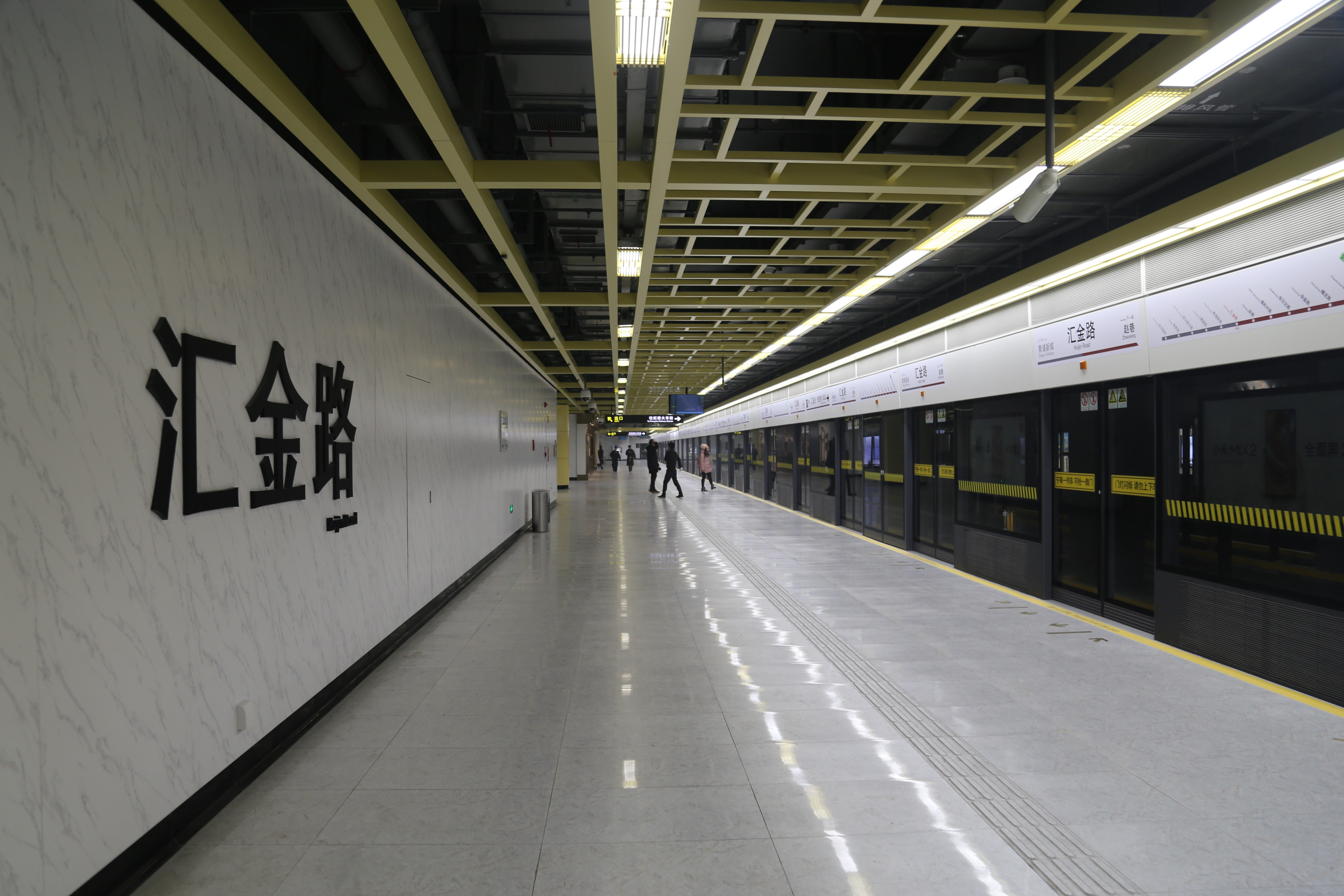
- Station platform, Hongqiao Railway Station-bound side

General information
- Location: East Yinggang Road and Huijin Road, Qingpu District, Shanghai; China
- Coordinates: 31.163127°N 121.147401°E
- Operator: Shanghai No. 2 Metro Operation Co. Ltd.
- Line: Line 17
- Platforms: 2 (2 side platforms)
- Tracks: 2

Construction
- Structure type: Underground
- Accessible: Yes

History
- Opened: 30 December 2017

Services
Preceding station	Shanghai Metro	Following station
Qingpu Xincheng towards Xicen	Line 17	Zhaoxiang towards Hongqiao Railway Station
Location
- Location within Shanghai

Huijin Road (simplified Chinese: 汇金路; traditional Chinese: 匯金路; pinyin: Huìjīn Lù) is a station on Line 17 of the Shanghai Metro. The station is located at the intersection of East Yinggang Road and Huijin Road in the city's Qingpu District, between Zhaoxiang and Qingpu Xincheng. It opened with the rest of Line 17 on 30 December 2017.

== History ==
The station opened for passenger trial operation on 30 December 2017, concurrent with the opening of the rest of Line 17.

== Description ==
The station is located at the intersection of East Yinggang Road and Huijin Road in Shanghai's Qingpu District. An underground structure, the station concourse and platforms are located one level below street level. Because the station consists of two side platforms, there are separate concourses on each side, with its own fare gates, customer service counter, ticketing machines, and toilets. Two adjacent passageways below the concourse and platform, one within the fare-paid zone and one outside the fare-paid zone, connect the two sides of the station.

Like all stations on Line 17, this station is fully accessible. There are two elevators, connecting the street level to the concourse and platform level on both sides of the station, outside the fare-paid zone. On the Hongqiao Railway Station-bound platform, the elevator is located near Exit 3. On the Oriental Land-bound platform, the elevator is located near Exit 1. There are no accessibility features available to access the passageway below the platform, so users must cross the street at ground level in order to change sides at the station.

=== Exits ===
The station has four exits, two on each side of the station. Passengers can use the underground passageway to cross between the two sides. However, those requiring accessibility features must cross at street level, as the passageway is not accessible.

- Oriental Land-bound side:
  - Exit 1: Huijin Road, East Yinggang Road
  - Exit 4: Huijin Road
- Hongqiao Railway Station-bound side:
  - Exit 2: Huijin Road
  - Exit 3: East Yinggang Road
