= Qingpu Xincheng station =

Shanghai Metro station

Qingpu Xincheng 青浦新城
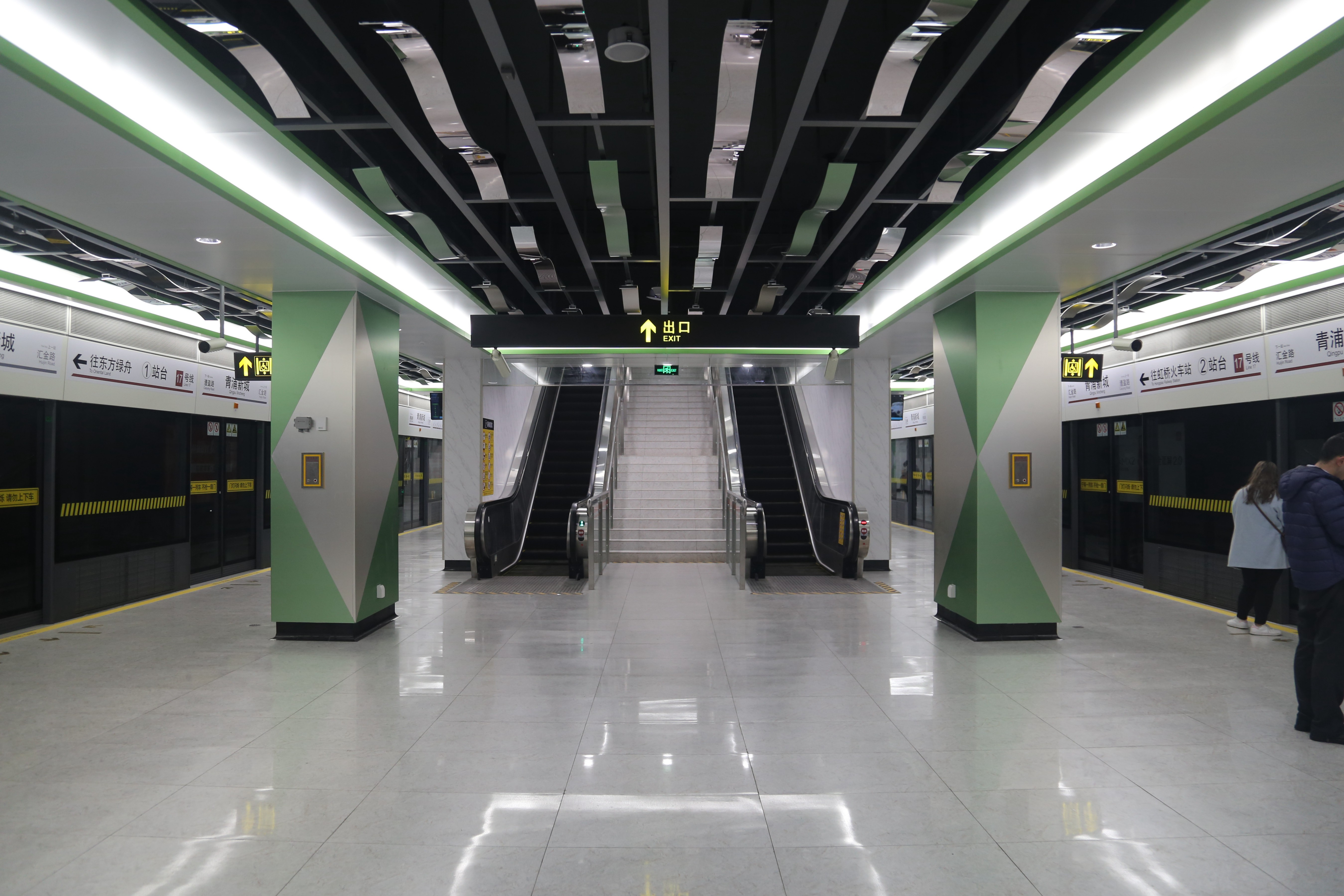
- Station platform

General information
- Location: Yinggang Road and Waiqingsong Highway, Qingpu District, Shanghai; China
- Coordinates: 31.160823°N 121.120926°E
- Operator: Shanghai No. 2 Metro Operation Co. Ltd.
- Line: Line 17
- Platforms: 2 (1 island platform)
- Tracks: 2

Construction
- Structure type: Underground
- Accessible: Yes

History
- Opened: 30 December 2017

Services
| Preceding station | Shanghai Metro | Following station |
|---|---|---|
| Caoying Road towards Xicen | Line 17 | Huijin Road towards Hongqiao Railway Station |
Location
- Location within Shanghai

Qingpu Xincheng (Chinese: 青浦新城; pinyin: Qīngpǔ Xīnchéng) is a station on Line 17 of the Shanghai Metro. The station is located at the intersection of Yinggang Road and Waiqingsong Highway, between Huijin Road and Caoying Road. It opened with the rest of Line 17 on 30 December 2017.

== History ==
The station opened for passenger trial operation on 30 December 2017, concurrent with the opening of the rest of Line 17.

== Description ==
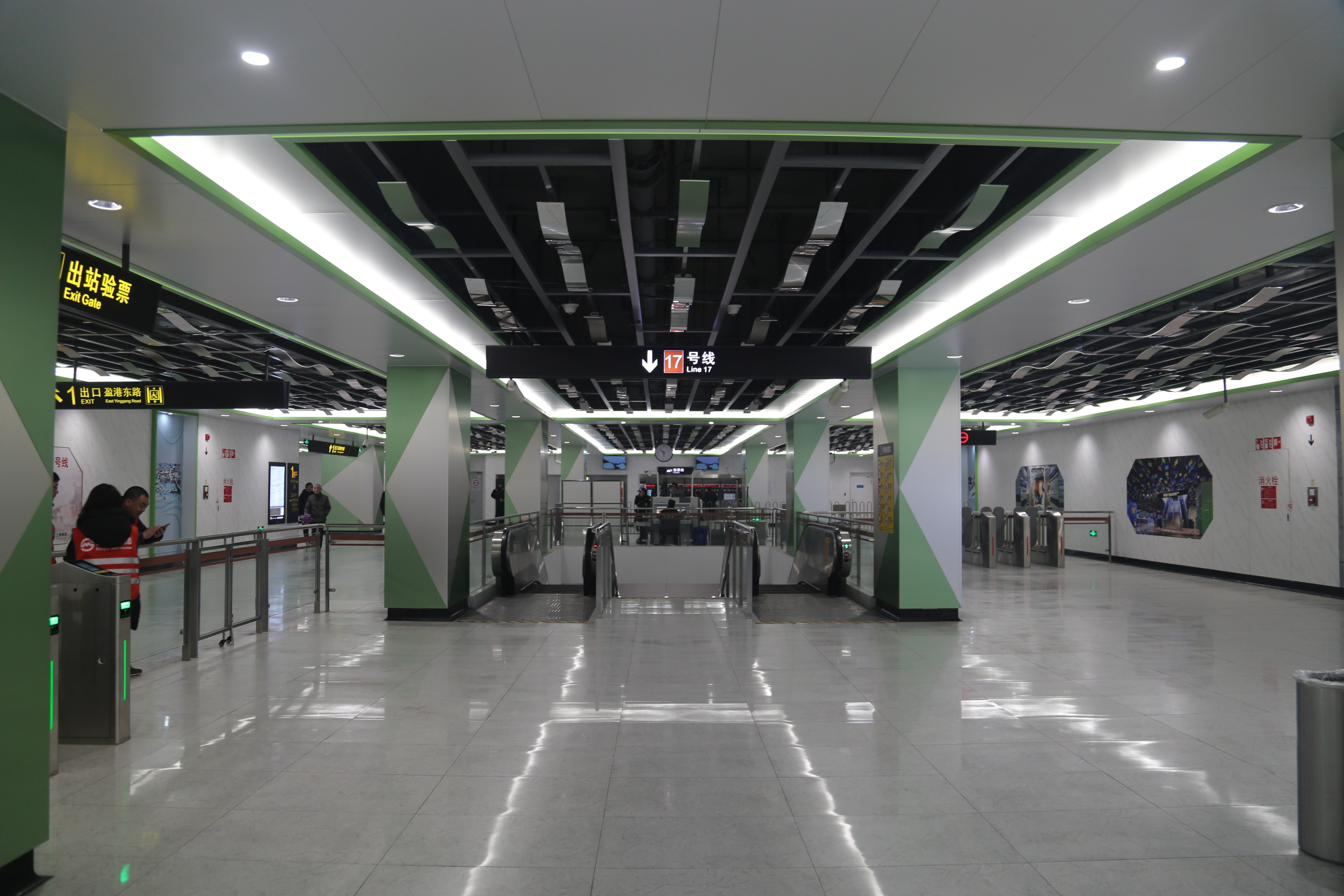
Station concourse

The station is located at the intersection of Yinggang Road and Waiqingsong Highway in Shanghai's Qingpu District. An underground structure, the station features a concourse level beneath street level, while trains stop one level below the concourse. The concourse can be accessed from four entrances and has fare gates, a customer service counter, and ticket machines. The platform level consists of an island platform, with toilets located on the platform's east end.

Like all stations on Line 17, this station is fully accessible. An elevator connects the street level to the concourse near Exit 1. Another elevator lies within the fare-paid zone, connecting the concourse to the platform.

=== Exits ===
The station has four exits:

- Exit 1: East Yinggang Road
- Exit 2: East Yinggang Road
- Exit 3: East Yinggang Road, Waiqingsong Highway
- Exit 4: exit to sunken plaza, shops
