= Youyi Road station (Shanghai Metro) =

Shanghai Metro station

Youyi Road 友谊路
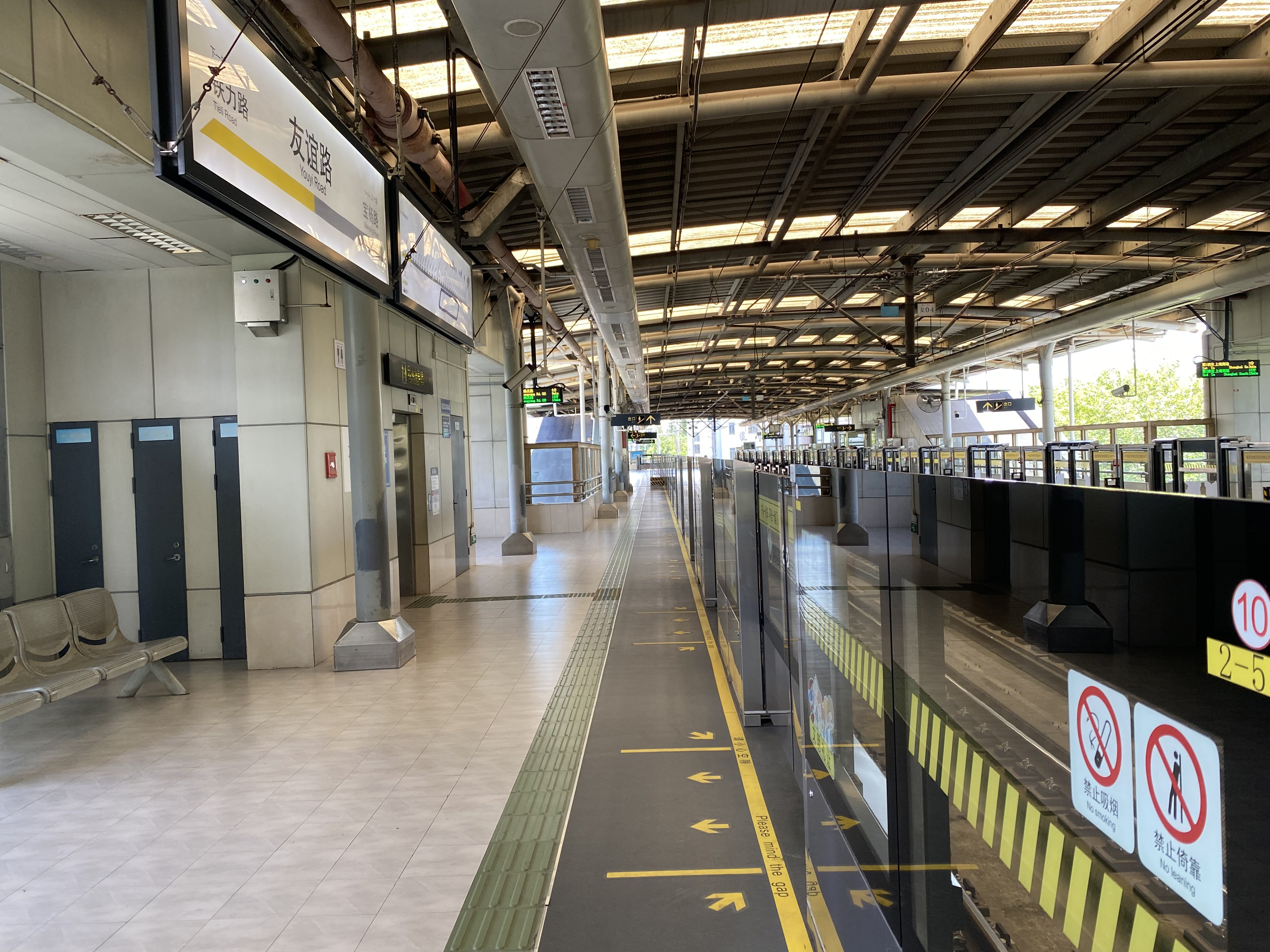
- Station platform

General information
- Location: Tongji Road (同济路) and Youyi Road; Baoshan District, Shanghai; China
- Coordinates: 31°24′14″N 121°28′33″E
- Operator: Shanghai No. 3 Metro Operation Co. Ltd.
- Line: Line 3
- Platforms: 2 (2 side platforms)
- Tracks: 2

Construction
- Structure type: Elevated
- Accessible: Yes

History
- Opened: 18 December 2006; 19 years ago

Services
| Preceding station | Shanghai Metro | Following station |
|---|---|---|
| Tieli Road towards North Jiangyang Road | Line 3 | Baoyang Road towards Shanghai South Railway Station |
Location
- Location within Shanghai

Youyi Road (simplified Chinese: 友谊路; traditional Chinese: 友誼路; pinyin: Yǒuyì Lù) is a station on the Shanghai Metro Line 3. It is part of the northern extension of that line from Jiangwan Town to North Jiangyang Road that opened on 18 December 2006.
