= Woosung railway =

Railway line in Shanghai, China

Overview
- Locale: Shanghai, China
- Dates of operation: 1876–1877
- Predecessor: None
- Successor: Songhu railway

Technical
- Track gauge: 2 ft 6 in (762 mm)
- Length: 9 1/4 mi (14.9 km)

The Woosung railway (simplified Chinese: 吴淞铁路; traditional Chinese: 吳淞鐵路; pinyin: Wúsōng Tiělù) (Note: Also Wusong Road or Woo Sung Railway) (Note: It is sometimes also called the Songhu railway, although that name more properly refers to the 1890s railway which ran principally along the same route.) was a 19th-century, 2 ft 6 in (762 mm) narrow-gauge passenger railway in Shanghai, China, between the outskirts of the American Concession in the modern city's Zhabei District and Wusong in Baoshan District. Surreptitiously conceived and constructed, it ran for less than a year before it was purchased and dismantled by the Qing viceroy Shen Baozhen. The line would not be rebuilt for twenty years. This fate was a commonly invoked symbol of the Qing dynasty's backwardness and insularity, despite the road's admitted illegality and numerous legitimate objections voiced by the Chinese during its construction and operation.

Its route – still primarily rural as late as the turn of the century – now forms part of the Shanghai Metro's elevated Line 3.

== History ==
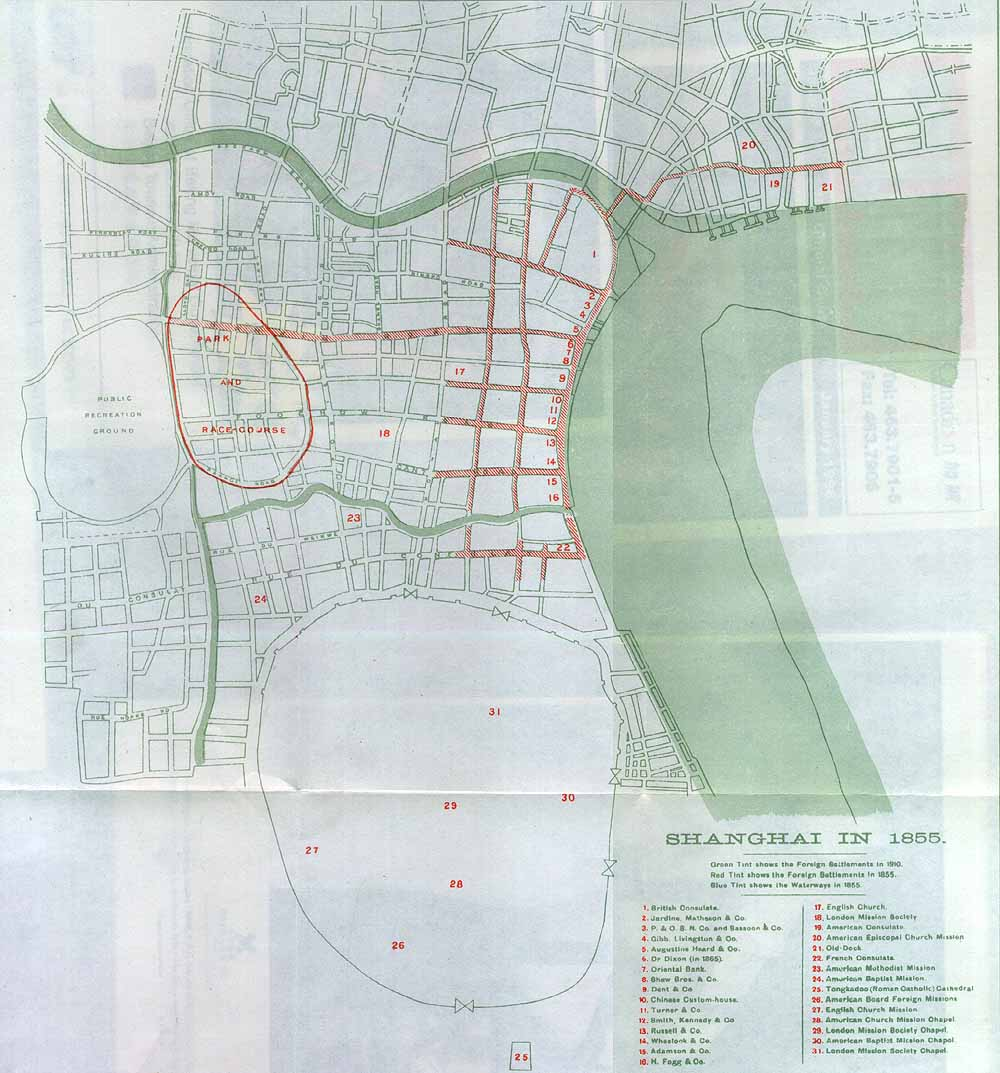
Shanghai, 1855

=== Background ===
Following the success of the first British railroads and the concessions to foreign traders following the 1842 Treaty of Nanking ending the First Opium War, European and American diplomats and merchants began to advocate for the development of railroads within China. The British firm Jardine, Matheson, & Company in particular started to champion rail connections from the interior to Canton, Shanghai, and Tianjin as early as 1845. MacDonald Stephenson, the engineer responsible for the East Indian Railway, attempted to interest the imperial government in rail links from Hong Kong and Shanghai to Calcutta through Hankou and Kunming in 1859 and again in 1864. These proposals were rejected even by the foreign-led Hong Kong Chamber of Commerce, which thought it might impact established shipping. A request of 20 July 1863 by 27 firms for a Shanghai-to-Suzhou line was similarly rejected by the governor of Jiangsu Li Hongzhang and in 1865 by the circuit intendant of Shanghai Ying Baoshi, who composed an influential treatise, "The 7 No's", (Note: Chinese: 七不可; pinyin: Qī Bù Kě; Wade–Giles: Chih-pu-k'o) on the occasion.

However, in 1864, American Chinese began to be employed by the Central Pacific Railroad and by March 1865 the company was recruiting thousands of workers directly from Guangdong Province. The well-liked inspector general Robert Hart and the British minister Sir Thomas Wade made strenuous cases for the adoption of western technology in 1865, cases that were picked up first by Shanghainese merchants and then by the Imperial bureaucracy itself in a heated debate from 1866 to 1867, which ultimately decided to continue opposition to foreign-controlled rail.

Objections raised then and subsequently included that lines would facilitate foreign interference with – and invasions of – the interior, that railways' straight lines promoted bad feng shui, that their presence would antagonize the official and peasant classes, and that their competition would destroy the livelihood of porters and ferrymen along the canals, leading them to banditry. Whereas canals assisted irrigation along their routes and could not be stolen, railways would inevitably occupy and pollute arable land and invite theft. Even supporters of railways insisted that it was essential to keep any lines Chinese-controlled and to oppose foreign ones.

=== Construction ===
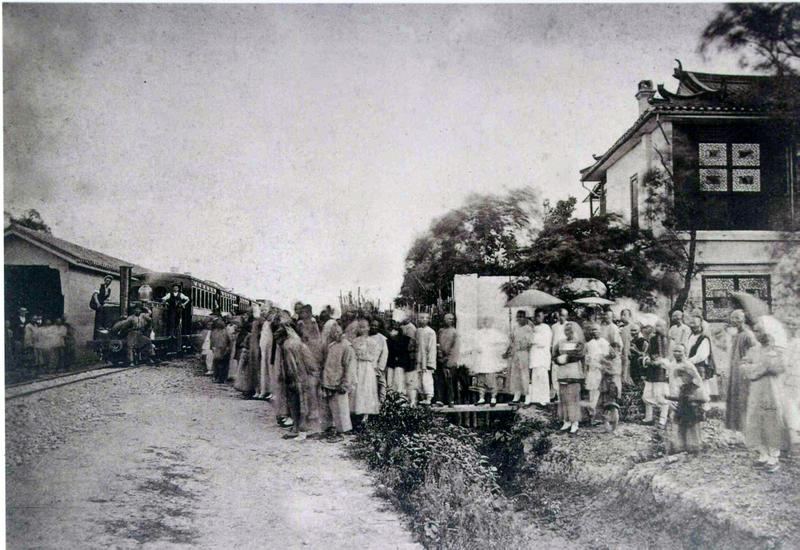
The opening of the Woosung road.

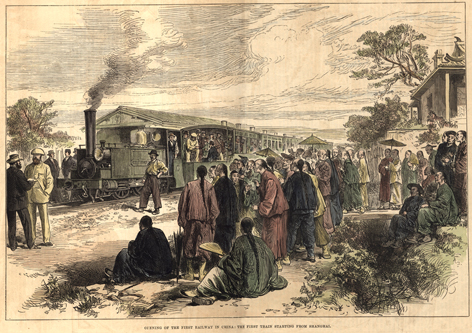
The opening of the Woosung Road, as depicted by the September 2, 1876, Illustrated London News.

Nonetheless, officials at Shanghai were repeatedly troubled about constructing a railway between the city and a Yangtze port, as the mouth of the Suzhou Creek continued to silt up, obstructing deep-bottomed foreign vessels. Jardine, Matheson, & Co. initially established the Woosung Road Company as a front with a 200-share issue in 1865. Distributing shares to local businessmen did not succeed in winning official approval and land purchases were far more expensive than expected. The company stopped work in 1867.

The surreptitious construction by the Danish Great Northern Telegraph Company of a riverine line connecting the Hong Kong–Wusong telegraph lines to Shanghai in 1870 and its eventual protection by local authorities against theft and disruption in the summer of 1872 suggested a course forward.

In the winter of 1872–1873, the American vice-consul Oliver Bradford began purchasing and leasing a 15-yard (14 m) –wide strip of land within the American Concession, although it was common knowledge – both among the Shanghailanders and the local Shanghainese – the ultimate intention would be conversion to rail. As the construction of a Chinese railway was a clear violation of Article VIII of the 1868 Burlingame Treaty, American interests in the enterprise were sold to Jardine's Woosung Road Company, which extended the Danish telegraph from Wusong south to Shanghai along its right-of-way on 12 August 1873. The revived company was led by Jardine's British Shanghai chief F.B. Johnson, the Americans Augustus Hayes of Olyphant & Co. and Frank Forbes of Russell & Co., the British E. Iveson of Iveson & Co., and the Danish G.H.N. Dreyer of the Great Northern. Concurrently with this revival, the Woosung Tramway Company was established separately to manage purchases and planning for the railway. A third company, the Woosung Railway Company, Limited, was incorporated in London on July 28, 1874, to raise capital for imported British rails and rolling stock, which arrived on December 18, 1875.

Even before realizing a railway was intended, the regional viceroy Shen Baozhen noticed that public land at Wusong had been fraudulently sold to the "road" (Note: A local named Li K'un-yung had leased land belonging to his widowed sister-in-law to the company, with two local dibao assisting him and adding public land to the lot. The dibao received 2,950 and 1,200 lashes with a bamboo rod, respectively; Li received only 500 but the experience killed him. The British consul protested returning the land for months, but was forced to yield owing to the fraud and the land's proximity to numerous official buildings including the Wusong battery and the Baoshan magistrate's office. (Confus, 664–665.)) and demanded its repurchase and a ban on any road crossing the Wenzaobang to enter Wusong proper. His subsequent discovery that its conversion to rail had been previously mooted and was known to Feng Zhunguang, the circuit intendant of Shanghai, only increased his annoyance.

The British engineer Gabriel J. Morrison hammered in the first spike on 20 January 1876. The Pioneer ran its first trials on about a mile of track on February 14. Within a week, the circuit intendant of Shanghai Feng Zhunguang had written a protest to the British consul Walter H. Medhurst. After consultation, they agreed that the Chinese would permit construction to continue so long as the British ceased to employ the locomotive and that both would seek further instruction from their superiors. Upon being notified of the railway, Shen Baozhen ordered the circuit intendant to suspend all work: this failed, but workmen, dibao, and landowners came under such pressure that the company considered the agreement vitiated and restored the locomotive on March 20. Wade ordered the British naval commander to Shanghai and provided for protection against any local interference against the workmen.

The British secretary W.F. Mayers met with the circuit intendant of Shanghai six times in mid-April concerning a Chinese purchase of the railway; both concurred in principle but differed on how long Jardine's would continue its management role. Mayers demanded eight years, Feng would only permit three. Adamant objection from Wu Yuan-ping, the new governor of Jiangsu, ended these negotiations.

=== Operation ===
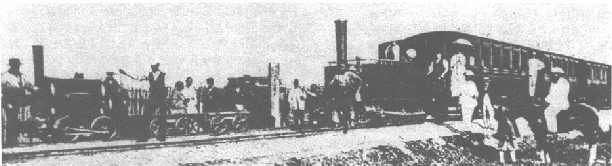
The Woosung Road in 1876.

The first engine was the Ransomes & Rapier 0-4-0 Pioneer. On June 12, the 0-6-0 Celestial Empire set the line's record, reaching 25 mph.

On June 30, 1876, the line was completed as far as Jiangwan. After two days of complimentary and publicity runs for Shanghailanders and local businessmen, this section was opened to passenger traffic on July 3. Over the next month, receipts averaged $40–60 a day. Business was brisk enough to necessitate adding an extra round trip to the original six on July 22.

On August 3, a local man was killed and Chinese troops from the Wusong garrison were stationed along the railway. The train driver David Banks was charged with manslaughter, but tried in a Western tribunal and acquitted on the grounds that the train had sounded and the suspicion the victim had been a suicide. Given the existing tensions, Thomas Wade used the Margary Affair and the ensuing negotiations over the Chefoo Convention to include advisors from the more conciliatory Li Hongzhang, since promoted to the prestigious viceroyalty of Zhili, into the negotiations in Shanghai and Nanjing. These lasted throughout October, but on the 24th, the Qing government signed with Wade "The Articles of Purchasing the Wusong Railway", which committed them to provide the railway's owners Tls. 285,000, payable in three installments over the course of the next year, at which point they would acquire complete ownership and management of the line. Jardine's agreed to sell in the interest of establishing a native rail network it could supply and help capitalize. At then-current exchange rates, this was equivalent to a £95,000 return on a £20,000 investment. Although Wade had originally only asked for Tls. 200,000, Shen initially offered to pay Tls. 300,000 within 24 hours simply to take immediate possession of the line before another incident.

Meanwhile, the company continued work on the line. On December 1, 1876, the extension to Wusong was completed and opened, with six cars running six round trips daily. By February, demand was great enough to increase the number of cars to nine, necessitating the use of dual locomotives on each run. At this point, the train had 130 seats and would sometimes carry 250 on festivals. In its year of service, the Woosung Road carried 187,876 passengers, the majority of whom preferred the relatively expensive first- and second-class service. The company posted profits of £27 per mile per week, comparable with British routes. Local Shanghainese entrepreneurs even established a pony-drawn bus service – with both its bus and uniforms modeled on the railroad's – from the Little East Gate of the old town.

=== Closure ===
The profit of the line made the British expectant of continued Chinese operation: in April, they engaged their foreign employees to another 18 months of service and, in September, ordered a fourth and larger locomotive. The railway's chief engineer, Morrison, even visited the officials at Suzhou to discuss construction of an extension for the line. A local petition was circulated among the Shanghainese requesting its continued operation.

However, as the foreigners made clear among themselves and to the Chinese, they intended to convert the railway to a freight line, competing with the China Merchants' Steam Navigation Company and forcing the issue of opening Wusong as a continuation of their concessions at Shanghai. Although the line's initial five freight cars were converted to passenger use in May 1876, twelve 5 ton–capacity replacements were delivered from Britain shortly later. The foreign diplomats also made no secret of their intention to expand concessions regarding Shanghai into its adjoining territory. During his negotiations over the line, the British secretary Mayers openly claimed that "Woosung is really but a part of the port of Shanghai under the Treaty of Tientsin".

Moreover, the importance of the line to the foreigners had already allowed Li Hongzheng to interfere with and even usurp Shen's authority within Jiangsu as a corollary to his authority over treaty negotiations. The line's purchases and operation increased property values, but divided farms and obstructed existing streams and canals with low bridges.

The Chinese authorities took possession of the line in October 1877, after which Shen had the railway disassembled. He answered the local pro-railroad petition with another which opposed it. At the same time, he also blocked French attempts to open a new road to Zikawei and British ones to extend Markham Road and Cemetery Road. Shanghailanders complained of the closure incessantly, including in the North-China Herald's obituary of Shen. The annoyance was compounded when the initial plan – to ship the rails and rolling stock to Qing Taiwan to help develop the coal mines there – failed to materialize on account of mishandling during shipment and lack of funds. Instead the equipment was dumped along the shore and left to rust.

=== Memorials ===
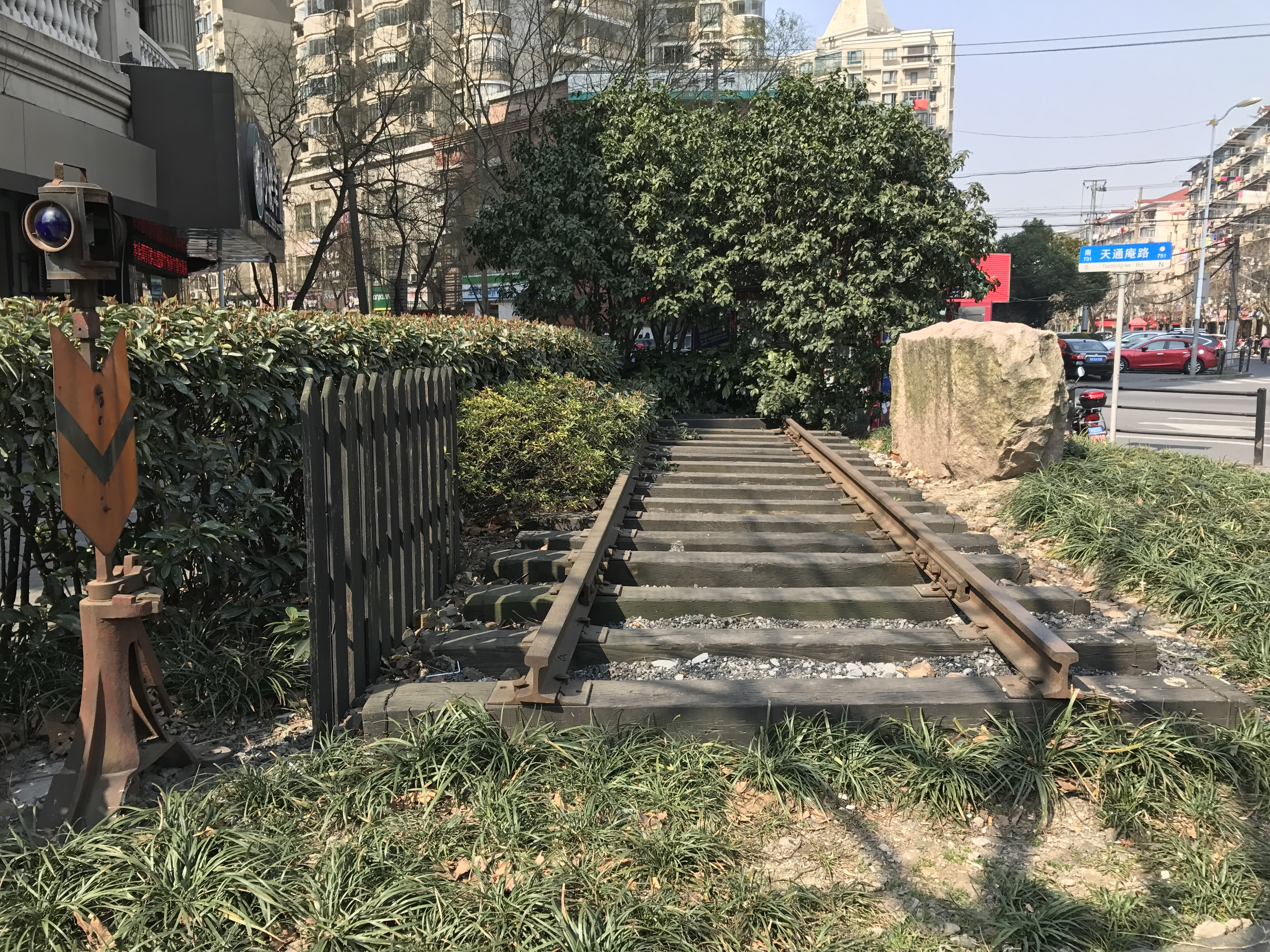
Remnant of the Tiantong'an Station on the Woosung railway in Hongkou District.

The Woosung railway's path now forms the stretch of the Shanghai Metro's elevated Line 3 between its Baoshan Road and Zhanghuabang stations. The Shanghai Railway Museum includes original Chinese-language memorials concerning the railway and a full-scale mock-up of the Pioneer.

== Named locomotives ==
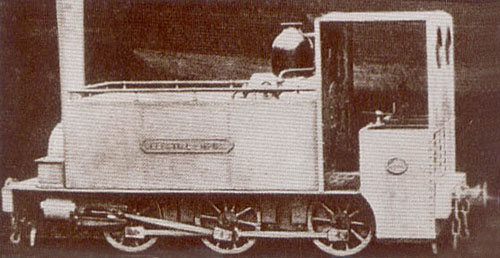
The "Celestial Empire" locomotive

- Pioneer (Note: simplified Chinese: 先导号; traditional Chinese: 先導號; pinyin: Xiāndǎo Hào) (0-4-0)
- Celestial Empire (Note: simplified Chinese: 天朝号; traditional Chinese: 天朝號; pinyin: Tiāncháo Hào) (0-6-0)
- Flowery Land (Note: simplified Chinese: 华国号; traditional Chinese: 華國號; pinyin: Huáguó Hào) (0-6-0)
- Viceroy (Note: simplified Chinese: 总督号; traditional Chinese: 總督號; pinyin: Zǒngdū Hào) (0-6-0)

== See also ==
- History of rail transport in China
- History of Shanghai
- Kaiping Tramway
- List of railways in China
