= Baoyang Road station =

Shanghai Metro station

Baoyang Road 宝杨路
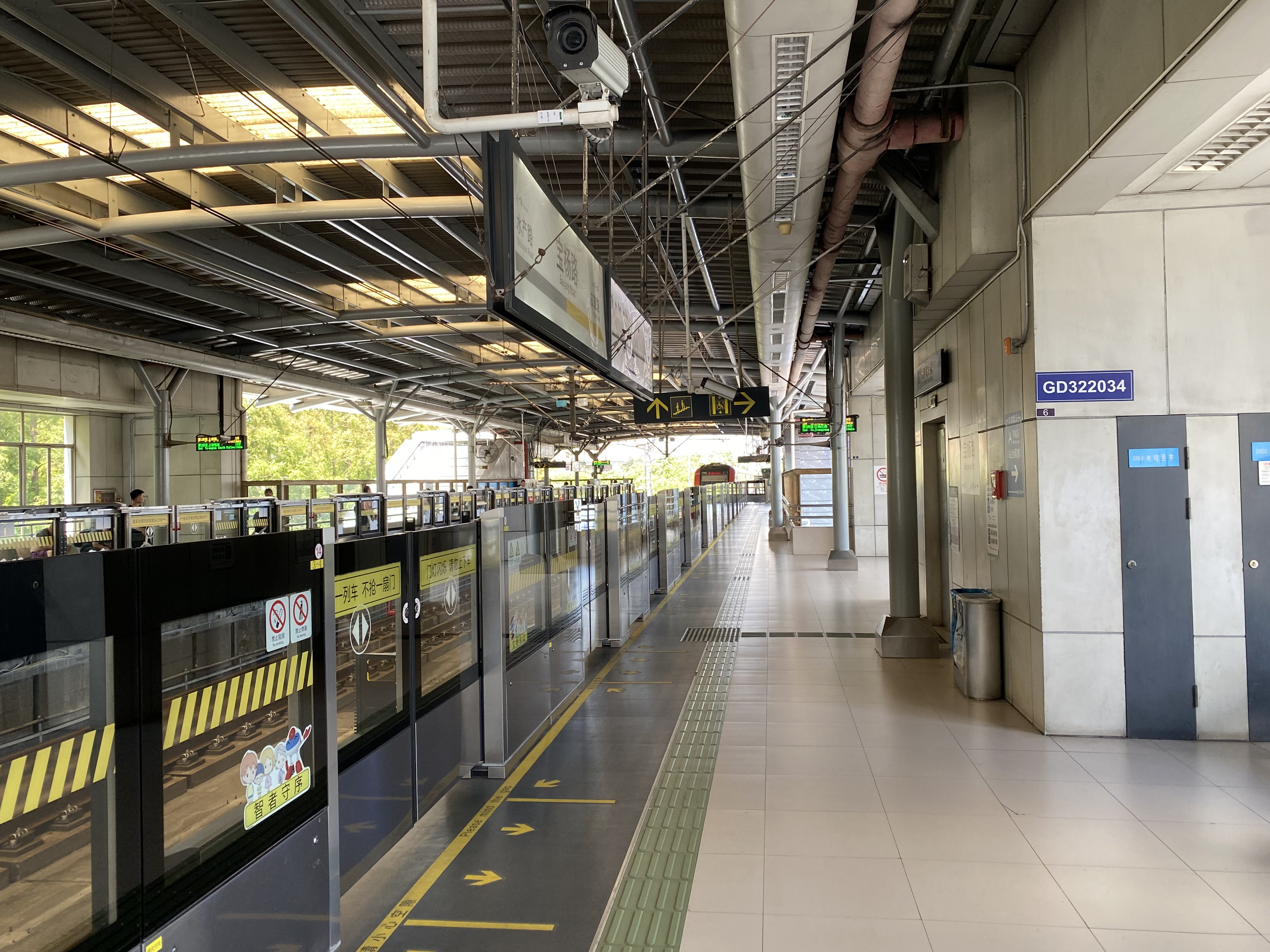
- Station platform

General information
- Location: Tongji Road (同济路) and Baoyang Road; Baoshan District, Shanghai; China
- Coordinates: 31°23′43″N 121°28′46″E
- Operator: Shanghai No. 3 Metro Operation Co. Ltd.
- Line: Line 3
- Platforms: 2 (2 side platforms)
- Tracks: 2

Construction
- Structure type: Elevated
- Accessible: Yes

History
- Opened: 18 December 2006; 19 years ago

Services
Preceding station	Shanghai Metro	Following station
Youyi Road towards North Jiangyang Road	Line 3	Shuichan Road towards Shanghai South Railway Station
Location
- Location within Shanghai

Baoyang Road (simplified Chinese: 宝杨路; traditional Chinese: 寶楊路; pinyin: Bǎoyáng Lù) is a station on Shanghai Metro Line 3. It is part of the northern extension of that line from Jiangwan Town to North Jiangyang Road that opened on 18 December 2006.

Baoyang Road Ferry Terminal is located nearby, servicing Chongming Island.
