= Zhanghuabang station =

Shanghai Metro station

Zhanghuabang 张华浜
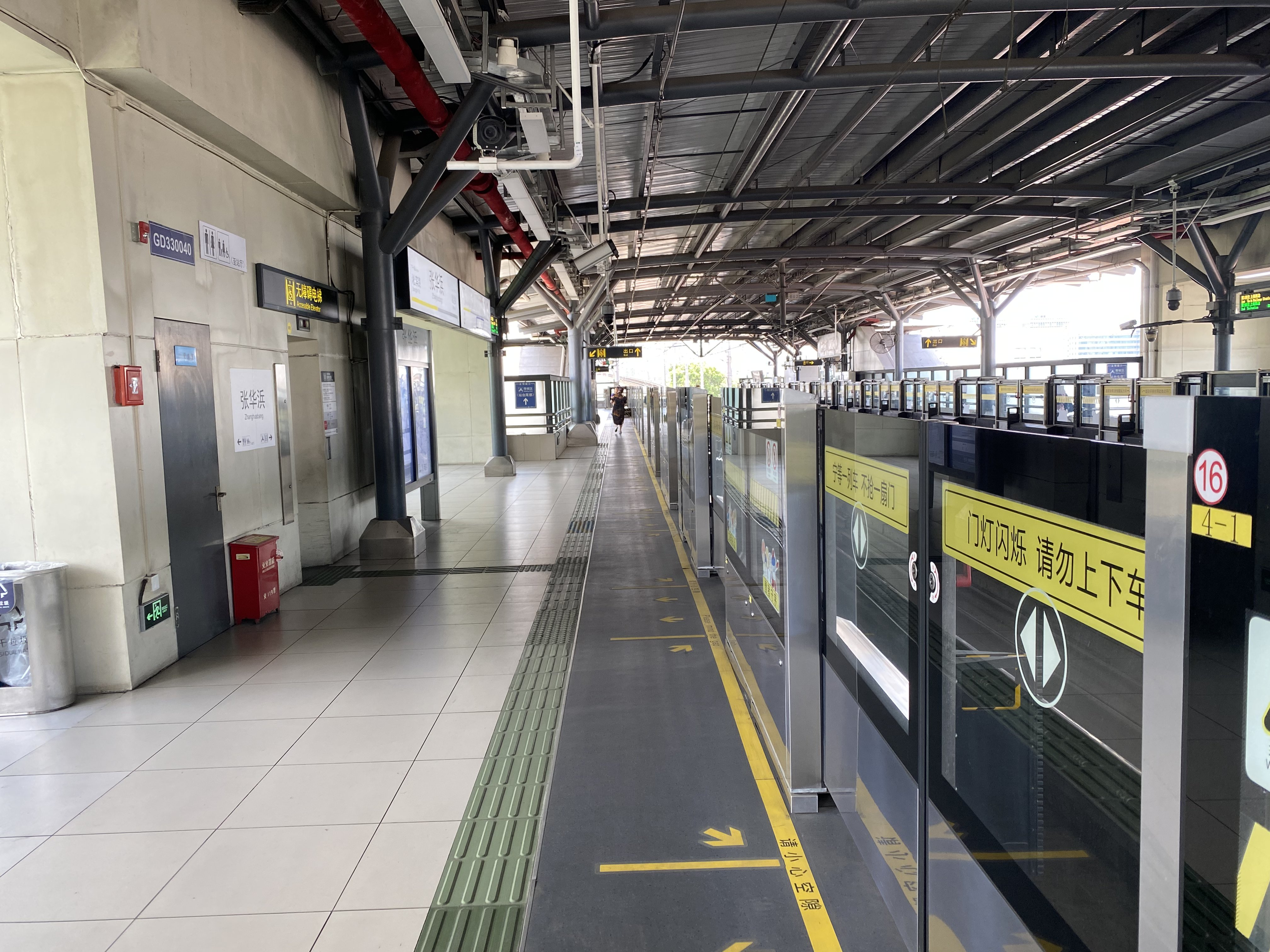

General information
- Location: Yixian Road (逸仙路); Baoshan District, Shanghai; China
- Coordinates: 31°21′29″N 121°29′55″E
- Operator: Shanghai No. 3 Metro Operation Co. Ltd.
- Line: Line 3
- Platforms: 2 (2 side platforms)
- Tracks: 2

Construction
- Structure type: Elevated
- Accessible: Yes

History
- Opened: 18 December 2006; 19 years ago

Services
Preceding station	Shanghai Metro	Following station
Songbin Road towards North Jiangyang Road	Line 3	Songfa Road towards Shanghai South Railway Station
Location
- Location within Shanghai

Zhanghuabang (simplified Chinese: 张华浜; traditional Chinese: 張華浜; pinyin: Zhānghuàbāng) is a station on the Shanghai Metro Line 3. It is part of the northern extension of that line from Jiangwan Town to North Jiangyang Road that opened on 18 December 2006. The station is named after Zhanghuabang River.
