= Songbin Road station =

Shanghai Metro station

Songbin Road 淞滨路
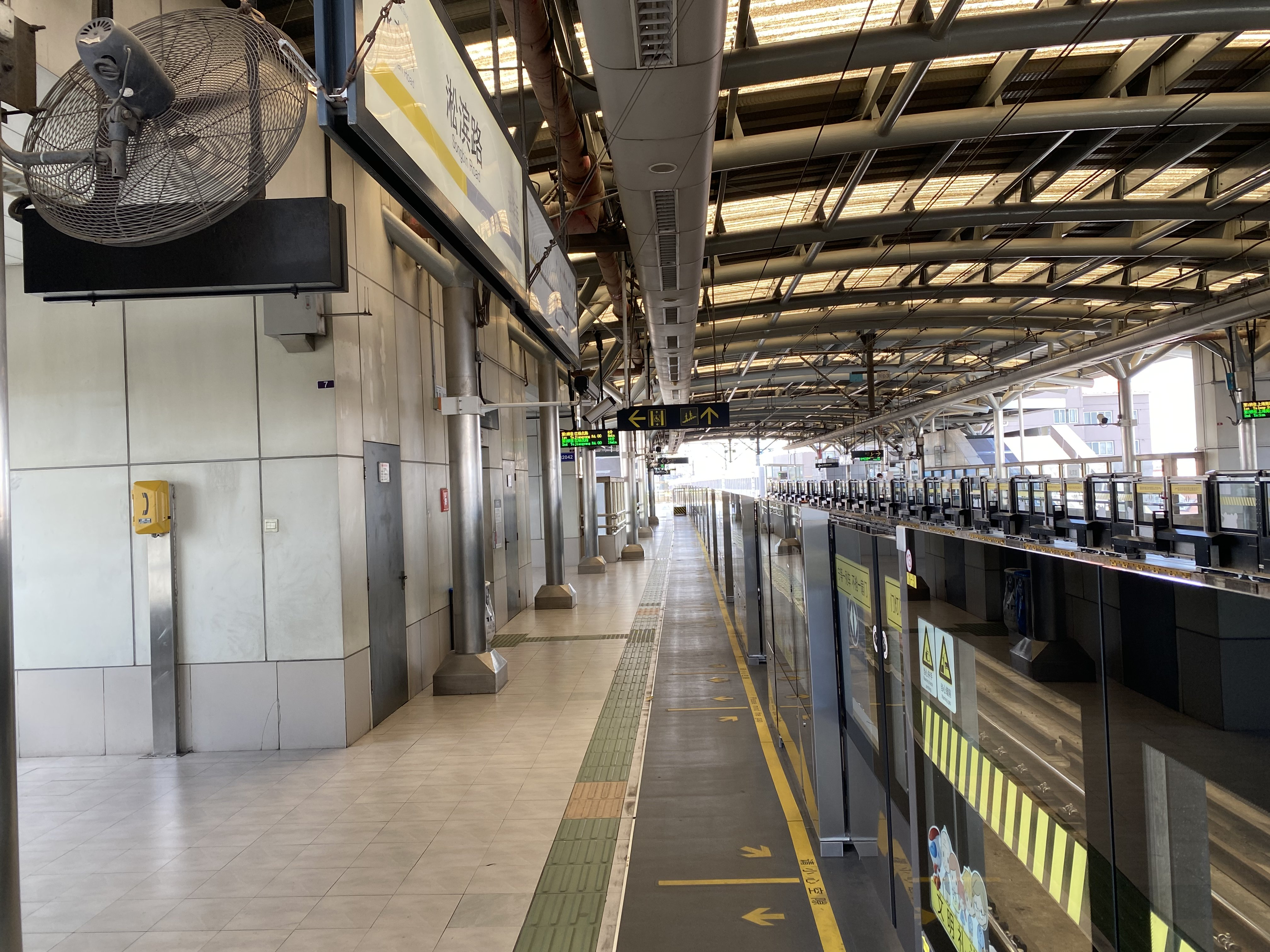
- Station platform

General information
- Location: Tongji Road (同济路) and Songbin Road; Baoshan District, Shanghai; China
- Coordinates: 31°22′15″N 121°29′34″E
- Operator: Shanghai No. 3 Metro Operation Co. Ltd.
- Line: Line 3
- Platforms: 2 (2 side platforms)
- Tracks: 2

Construction
- Structure type: Elevated
- Accessible: Yes

History
- Opened: 18 December 2006; 19 years ago

Services
Preceding station	Shanghai Metro	Following station
Shuichan Road towards North Jiangyang Road	Line 3	Zhanghuabang towards Shanghai South Railway Station
Location
- Location within Shanghai

Songbin Road (simplified Chinese: 淞滨路; traditional Chinese: 淞濱路; pinyin: Sōngbīn Lù) is a station on the Shanghai Metro Line 3. It is part of the northern extension of that line from Jiangwan Town to North Jiangyang Road that opened on 18 December 2006. The planned name of this station was Wusong Town.
