= Tieli Road station =

Shanghai Metro station

Tieli Road 铁力路
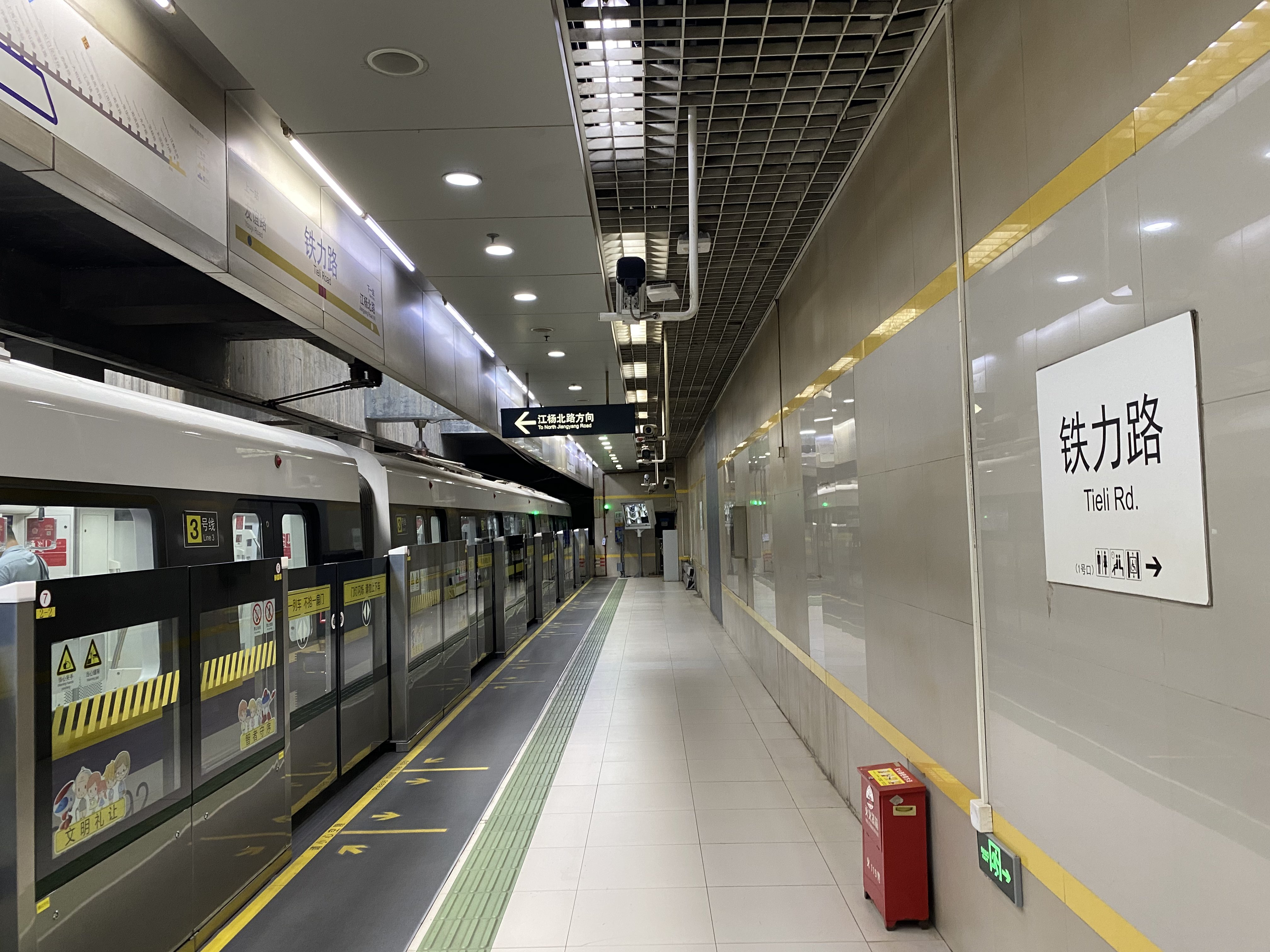

General information
- Location: Fujin Road (富锦路) and Kedong Road (克东路); Baoshan District, Shanghai; China
- Coordinates: 31°24′29″N 121°27′40″E
- Operator: Shanghai No. 3 Metro Operation Co. Ltd.
- Line: Line 3
- Platforms: 2 (2 side platforms)
- Tracks: 2

Construction
- Structure type: Underground (the only underground station on Line 3)
- Accessible: Yes

History
- Opened: 18 December 2006; 19 years ago

Services
| Preceding station | Shanghai Metro | Following station |
|---|---|---|
| North Jiangyang Road Terminus | Line 3 | Youyi Road towards Shanghai South Railway Station |
Location
- Location within Shanghai

Tieli Road (simplified Chinese: 铁力路; traditional Chinese: 鐵力路; pinyin: Tiělì Lù) is a station on the Shanghai Metro Line 3. The only sub-surface station on Line 3, it is part of the northern extension of that line from Jiangwan Town to North Jiangyang Road that opened on 18 December 2006.
