= Shanghai–Woosung railway =

Railway line in Shanghai, China

Songhu railway
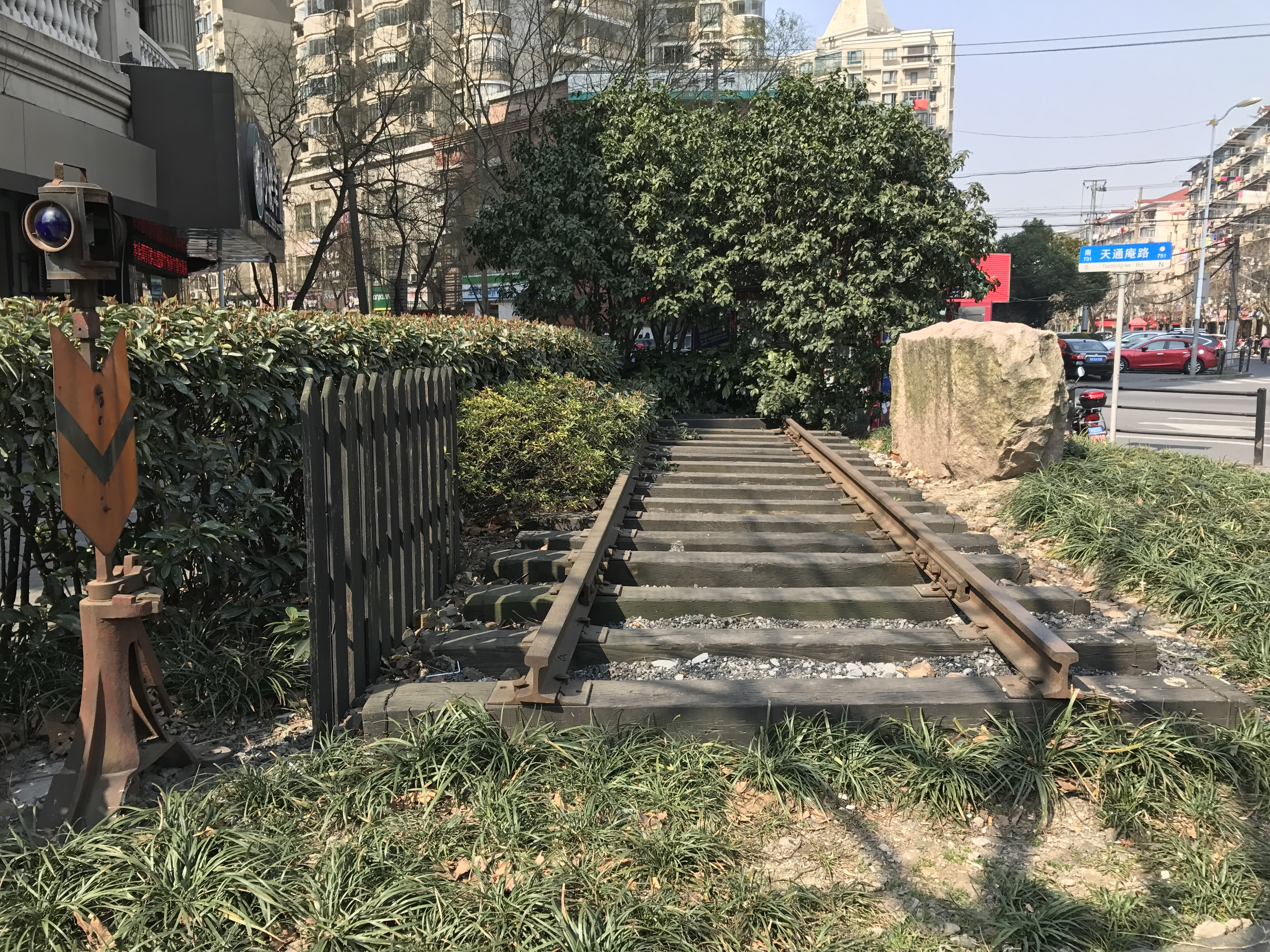
- Remains of Tiantong'an railway station on the Shanghai-Woosung railway

Overview
- Locale: Shanghai, China
- Dates of operation: 1898–
- Predecessor: Woosung railway
- Successor: Huning railway

Technical
- Track gauge: 1,435 mm (4 ft 8 1/2 in) standard gauge
- Length: 16 km (10 mi)

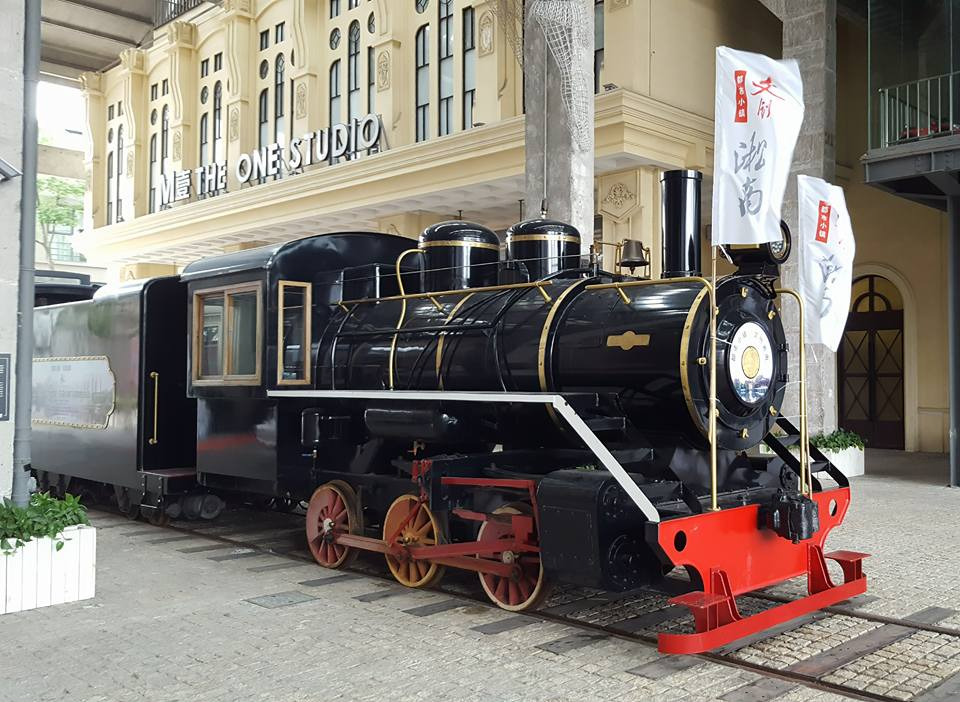
A steam locomotive of Songhu Railway

The Shanghai–Woosung or Songhu railway (Note: s 淞沪铁路, t 淞滬鐵路, p Sōng–Hù Tiělù, from Wusong and Hù Dú, an old name for Suzhou Creek.) was a standard-gauge railway in Shanghai, China. It was opened on September 1, 1898, and ran between the Old North Railway Station in the modern city's Zhabei District and Woosung in the modern Baoshan District.

It is sometimes conflated with the earlier Woosung Road, whose route it principally shared. That railway had been purchased from its foreign owners – principally the British firm Jardine, Matheson, & Company – in 1876 and dismantled for reuse in the Taiwanese coal fields. Sheng Xuanhuai established a new railroad generally along the same path as the old one, although the station was moved over a few streets to the Old North Station. The Songhu was also extended north into Woosung proper and additional stations opened.

The line was badly damaged during World War II. The route was eventually incorporated in the Shanghai Metro's Line 3. The former North Station is now the site of the Shanghai Railway Museum and another memorial was placed at the site of the former terminus beside Line 3's Songbin Road station.

== See also ==
- History of rail transport in China
- Woosung railway
- History of Shanghai
- List of railways in China
