= Line 3 (Shanghai Metro) =

Metro line of the Shanghai Metro

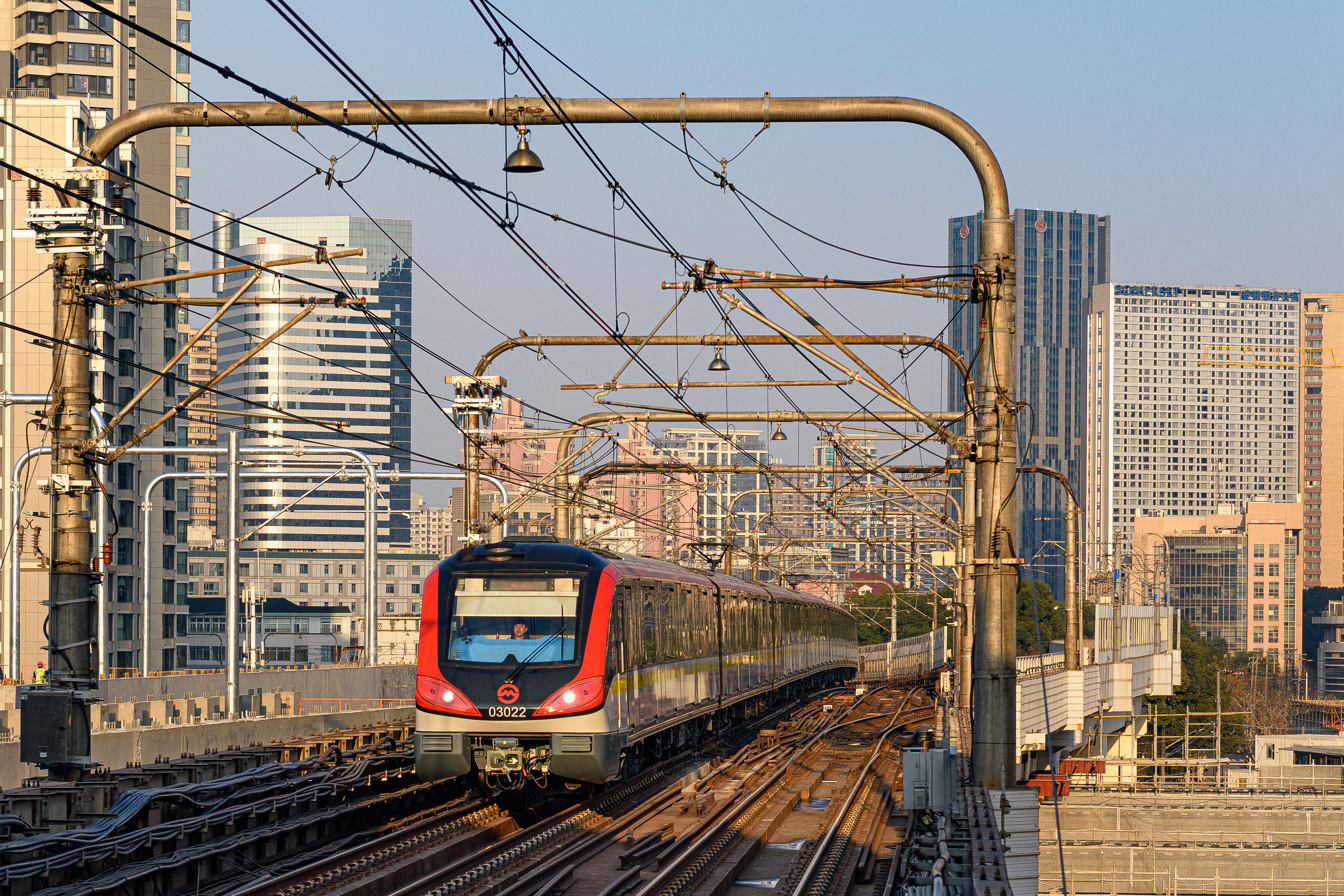
- A refurbished 03A01 train at Baoshan Road station

Overview
- Other name(s): M3 (planned name); Pearl (or Mingzhu) line (Chinese: 明珠线)
- Native name: 上海地铁3号线
- Status: Operational
- Owner: Shanghai Rail Transit Pearl Line Development Co., Ltd. (South of Shanghai Station); Shanghai Rail Transit Baoshan Line Development Co., Ltd. (Baoshan section)
- Locale: Xuhui, Changning, Putuo, Jing'an, Hongkou, and Baoshan districts, Shanghai, China
- Termini: North Jiangyang Road; Shanghai South Railway Station
- Stations: 29 (of which 9 shared with line 4)

Service
- Type: Rapid transit
- System: Shanghai Metro
- Operator: Shanghai No. 3 Metro Operation Co. Ltd.
- Depot(s): North Jiangyang Road Depot; Shilong Road Yard
- Rolling stock: 03A01; 03A02; 04A02
- Daily ridership: 621,000 (2019 Peak)

History
- Work began: June 27, 1997; 29 years ago
- Opened: December 26, 2000; 25 years ago
- Last extension: December 18, 2006; 19 years ago

Technical
- Line length: 40.23 km (25.0 mi) (of which 11.57 km (7 mi) shared with Line 4)
- Number of tracks: 2
- Character: Elevated (25 stations), Underground (1 station) and At-grade (3 stations)
- Track gauge: 1,435 mm (4 ft 8 1/2 in) standard gauge
- Electrification: Overhead wires (1500 volts)
- Operating speed: 80 km/h (50 mph); Average speed: 34.4 km/h (21 mph)
- Signalling: ALSTOM/CASCO URBALISTM 200 (Enhanced fixed block, current); CASCO Qiji TACS (2025 exp.)
Route map
Route on the Shanghai map:
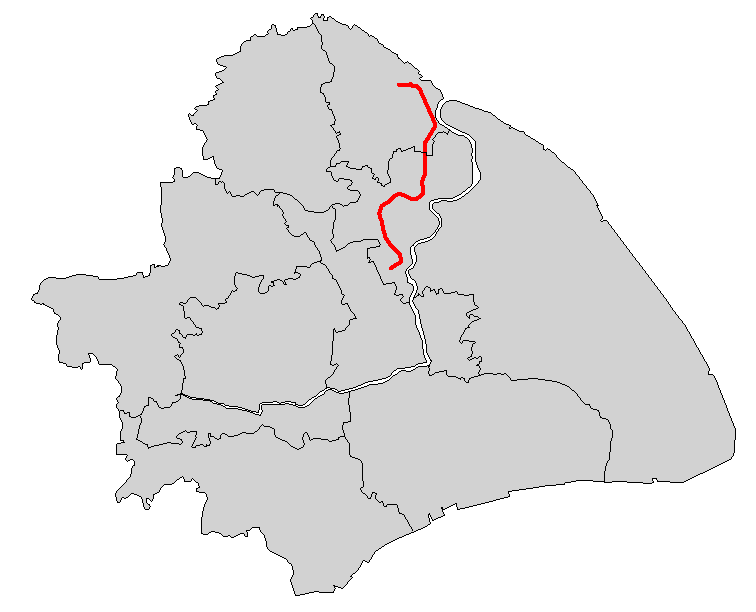
To scale geographic map:

Line 3 is a north–south line of the Shanghai Metro network. Its current rolling stock, 03A01, carry a bright yellow colour belt to differentiate them from Line 4 trains which share a portion of its route, while the newer stock, 03A02, features a yellow and purple livery, which the exact line is labelled using sticker or screens saying "Line 3" or "Line 4". Unlike the majority of the lines in the Shanghai Metro system, Line 3 is primarily elevated, entirely above ground except for Tieli Road, located at the entrance to Baosteel Group Corporation. The line runs from North Jiangyang Road in the north to Shanghai South Railway Station in the southwest of the city, where it meets line 1. While line 1 goes straight through the city center, line 3 roughly follows the Inner Ring Road around the city from Caoxi Road to Zhongtan Road (where it turns eastwards to join the route of the Shanghai–Nanjing railway). The line has about 300 drivers. Between December 26, 2000, and August 8, 2002, the line operated under the name Pearl Line; On August 8, 2002, it was renamed as Rail Transit Line 3. The line is colored yellow on system maps.

== History ==
This line followed the route of historic railway lines Shanghai-Hangzhou Railway Inner Circle Line from Shanghai South Railway Station to Shanghai Railway Station, and Songhu Railway from Baoshan Road station to Jiangwan Town station.

- December 26, 2000: Shanghai South-Jiangwan Town (trial opening)
- August 2001: Shanghai South-Jiangwan Town (official opening)
- January 2004: As part of the Shanghai South reconstruction scheme, Line 3 suspended service at the station, operating between Shilong Road and Jiangwan Town.
- June 10, 2004: Service suspended at Shilong Road, Longcao Road and Caoxi Road for automatic signal system testing and restoration of land subsidence at these three stations. Service was restored at these stations on July 24.
- October 15, 2005: Service to Shanghai South Railway Station was restored after the completion of the reconstruction scheme.
- December 18, 2006: Line 3 was extended from Jiangwan Town 15 km (9.3 mi) further north to Jiangyang North Road, providing rapid transit service to neighbourhoods in Baoshan, as well as to the Baosteel Group Corporation.

In October 2006, according to a new naming scheme, East Wenshui Road station was renamed Dabaishu station. The scheme stressed naming stations after existing toponyms, sights and attractions (if any) rather than simply after neighbouring vertical streets, making it easier for visitors to find these places. In this particular case, the renaming aimed also to eliminate possible confusion between Wenshui East Road and Wenshui Road, a newer station of line 1. However, in a more recent case, the same type of confusion occurred at West Yingao Road station of line 3 and East Yingao Road station of line 10.

Shanghai Metro Line 3 opening history
Segment	Commencement	Opened	Length	Station(s)	Name	Investment
Shanghai South — Jiangwan Town	1 Mar 1997	26 Dec 2000	24.6 km (15.29 mi)	19	Pearl line	¥9.378 billion
Jiangwan Town — North Jiangyang Road	1 Jan 2002	18 Dec 2006	15.7 km (9.76 mi)	10	Northern extension	¥3.2188 billion

== Stations ==
=== Service routes ===
Shanghai Metro Line 3 service routes
M - Mainline: Shanghai South Railway Station ↔ North Jiangyang Road; P - Partial Mainline: Shanghai South Railway Station ↔ South Changjiang Road
Routes		Station name		4	Connections	Distance			Location	Open- ing	Plat- form
M	P	English	Chinese	4	Connections	km		min	Location	Open- ing	Plat- form
●	●	Shanghai South Railway Station	上海南站		1 15 Jinshan SNH	0.00	0.00	0	Xuhui	26 Dec 2000	At-grade; Island
●	●	Shilong Road	石龙路			1.25	1.25	3	Xuhui	26 Dec 2000	At-grade; Side
●	●	Longcao Road	龙漕路		12	1.48	2.73	6	Xuhui	26 Dec 2000	Elevated; Side
●	●	Caoxi Road	漕溪路			1.03	3.76	8	Xuhui	26 Dec 2000	Elevated; Side
●	●	Yishan Road	宜山路		4 (Note: It is the southernmost station shared by lines 3 and 4, although the two lines do not share tracks (the line 4 station is underground).) 9	1.54	5.30	10	Xuhui	26 Dec 2000	Elevated; Side
●	●	Hongqiao Road	虹桥路	●	10	1.37	6.67	13	Changning	26 Dec 2000	Elevated; Side
●	●	West Yan'an Road	延安西路	●	Yan'an BRT	1.41	8.08	15	Changning	26 Dec 2000	Elevated; Side
●	●	Zhongshan Park	中山公园	●	2	0.96	9.04	17	Changning	26 Dec 2000	Elevated; Island
●	●	Jinshajiang Road	金沙江路	●	13	1.66	10.70	20	Putuo	26 Dec 2000	Elevated; Side
●	●	Caoyang Road	曹杨路	●	11 14 (Note: Virtual transfer with line 14 – passengers who hold the Shanghai Public Transportation Card and transfer within 30 minutes of exiting the station are able to transfer to other lines without exiting the system.)	0.90	11.60	22	Putuo	26 Dec 2000	Elevated; Side
●	●	Zhenping Road	镇坪路	●	7	1.40	13.00	24	Putuo	26 Dec 2000	Elevated; Side
●	●	Zhongtan Road	中潭路	●		1.44	14.44	27	Putuo	26 Dec 2000	Elevated; Side
●	●	Shanghai Railway Station	上海火车站	●	1 (Note: Virtual transfer with line 1 – passengers who hold the Shanghai Public Transportation Card and transfer within 30 minutes of exiting the station are able to transfer to other lines without exiting the system.) SHH	1.72	16.16	29	Jing'an	26 Dec 2000	At grade Island
●	●	Baoshan Road	宝山路	● (Note: Only the platform 3, Line 3 towards North Jiangyang Road and Line 4 clockwise.)		2.03	18.19	32	Jing'an	26 Dec 2000	Elevated; Island & Side
●	●	Dongbaoxing Road	东宝兴路			1.11	19.30	35	Hongkou	26 Dec 2000	Elevated; Side
●	●	Hongkou Football Stadium	虹口足球场		8	1.28	20.58	37	Hongkou	26 Dec 2000	Elevated; Side
●	●	Chifeng Road	赤峰路			1.15	21.73	39	Hongkou	26 Dec 2000	Elevated; Side
●	●	Dabaishu	大柏树			0.91	22.64	41	Hongkou	26 Dec 2000	Elevated; Side
●	●	Jiangwan Town	江湾镇			1.79	24.43	44	Hongkou	26 Dec 2000	Elevated; Side
●	●	West Yingao Road	殷高西路			1.60	26.03	47	Baoshan	18 Dec 2006	Elevated; Side
●	●	South Changjiang Road	长江南路		18	1.51	27.54	49	Baoshan	18 Dec 2006	Elevated; Side
●		Songfa Road	淞发路			1.69	29.23	52	Baoshan	18 Dec 2006	Elevated; Side
●		Zhanghuabang	张华浜			1.52	30.75	54	Baoshan	18 Dec 2006	Elevated; Side
●		Songbin Road	淞滨路			1.55	32.30	57	Baoshan	18 Dec 2006	Elevated; Side
●		Shuichan Road	水产路			1.24	33.54	59	Baoshan	18 Dec 2006	Elevated; Side
●		Baoyang Road	宝杨路			1.75	35.29	62	Baoshan	18 Dec 2006	Elevated; Side
●		Youyi Road	友谊路			1.03	36.32	64	Baoshan	18 Dec 2006	Elevated; Side
●		Tieli Road	铁力路			1.70	38.02	67	Baoshan	18 Dec 2006	Underground; Side
●		North Jiangyang Road	江杨北路			2.10	40.12	70	Baoshan	18 Dec 2006	At-grade; Side

=== Important stations ===
- North Jiangyang Road – The northern terminus.
- Youyi Road – Baoshan Town is located near this station.
- Baoyang Road – Baoyang Road Ferry Terminal is located nearby.
- Songbin Road – This station is located at Wusong Town, with a memorial for the Songhu Railway, which was constructed in the 1890s along the route of China's first railway, the Woosung Road
- Jiangwan Town – The Jiangwan Town offices are nearby this station.
- Hongkou Football Stadium – Located near the residence of Shanghai Shenhua Football Club.
- Shanghai Railway Station – Covered with line 4 service. A Virtual interchange with line 1 is also present.
- Zhongshan Park – Interchange with lines 2 and 4.
- Yishan Road – Interchange with lines 4 and 9.
- Shanghai South Railway Station – Interchange with lines 1 and 15.

== Headways ==
Because the Baoshan Road station - Hongqiao Road station section is covered with line 4 service, line 3 operates on a comparatively looser schedule, with an average interval of around 7 minutes (5 minutes in the peak hours). However, riders can expect a 2-minute train interval at any one of the shared-line stations during rush hour. Line 3 trains have the number "3" painted on the sides of cars, and line 4 trains the number "4". During trail operation, headways were 30 minutes, reduced to 15 minutes in September 2001. The line was extremely popular with 15,000 passengers on the first day and 30,000 after three day.

Not all trains serve the whole line. Some trains terminate at Changjiang South Road, while others continue to Jiangyang North Road, the northernmost station. Therefore, service between Changjiang South Road and Jiangyang North Road operates on a 10-to-12-minute basis, compared to the rest of the line which operates on a 5-to-7-minute basis. An LED screen in front of a train will indicate its terminal station, in addition to the station broadcast and the arrival board.

Because line 3 is elevated, transferring to other underground stations typically takes more walking. In-system transfer has been introduced to all interchange stations except Shanghai Railway Station (where lines 3 and 4 meets line 1). Virtual interchange is offered at both stations for Public Transportation Card holders.

Shanghai Metro Line 3 headway
Time		Shanghai South Railway Station - South Changjiang Road	South Changjiang Road - North Jiangyang Road
Monday - Friday (Working Days)
AM peak	7:30–9:00	Northbound: (Note: Northbound to South Changjiang Road.) About 5 min - 7 min and 30 sec Southbound: (Note: Southbound to Shanghai South Railway Station.) About 2 min and 30 sec - 5 min	Northbound: (Note: Northbound to North Jiangyang Road.) About 5 min - 10 min Southbound: About 5 min - 10 min
Off-peak	9:00–17:00	About 7 min	About 14 min
PM peak	17:00–19:30	About 5 min	About 10 min
Other hours	Before 7:00 After 19:30	About 7 - 10 min	About 14 - 17 min
Saturday and Sunday (Weekends)
Peak	8:00–20:00	About 6 min and 30 sec	About 13 min
Other hours	Before 8:00 After 20:00	About 7 - 10 min	About 13 - 16 min

== Technology ==
=== Signaling ===
Line 3 has been operating over capacity due to large passenger flows for a number of years. With the continuous extensions of operating time, the problems of aging equipment and increasing passenger demand will further increase the operating pressure of the two lines. In June 2021 it was announced that Shanghai Metro has started to update of the signal system and finish before December 31, 2024. These are the last lines in the system that are equipped with fixed block Alstom URBALISTM 200 system, not equipped with CBTC systems capable of headways as low as 90 seconds. CASCO successfully won the bid for the renewal and transformation of the signaling using Qiji TACS system.

=== Rolling Stock ===
Currently, additional 13 04A02 trains (set 0437–0449) are assigned to line 3.

All are Class A 6 cars in length. (Note: Class A carriage: 21-24m in length, 3.0m in width and 3.8m in height; Capacity: about 310 people.)

Shanghai Metro Line 3 rolling stock
Fleet numbers	Manufacturer	Time of manufacturing	Class	No of car	Assembly (Note: Tc: Trailer with cab; Mp: EMU with pantograph; M: EMU without pantograph.)	Rolling stock	Number	Notes
168	Alstom France (301,302); CRRC Nanjing Puzhen Co., Ltd. (303-328)	2001-2004	A	6	Tc+Mp+M+M+Mp+Tc	03A01	301-328 (02011-02301, 03011-03961 and 04011-04421)	Original name: AC03.
48	SATCO (Note: SATCO (Shanghai Alstom Transportation Equipment Co., Ltd.) is a joint venture between Alstom Metropolis and Shanghai Electric.) (0333-0336); CRRC Changchun Railway Vehicles Co., Ltd. (0329-0332)	2014-2017	A	6	Tc+Mp+M+M+Mp+Tc	03A02	0329-0336 (031691-032161)

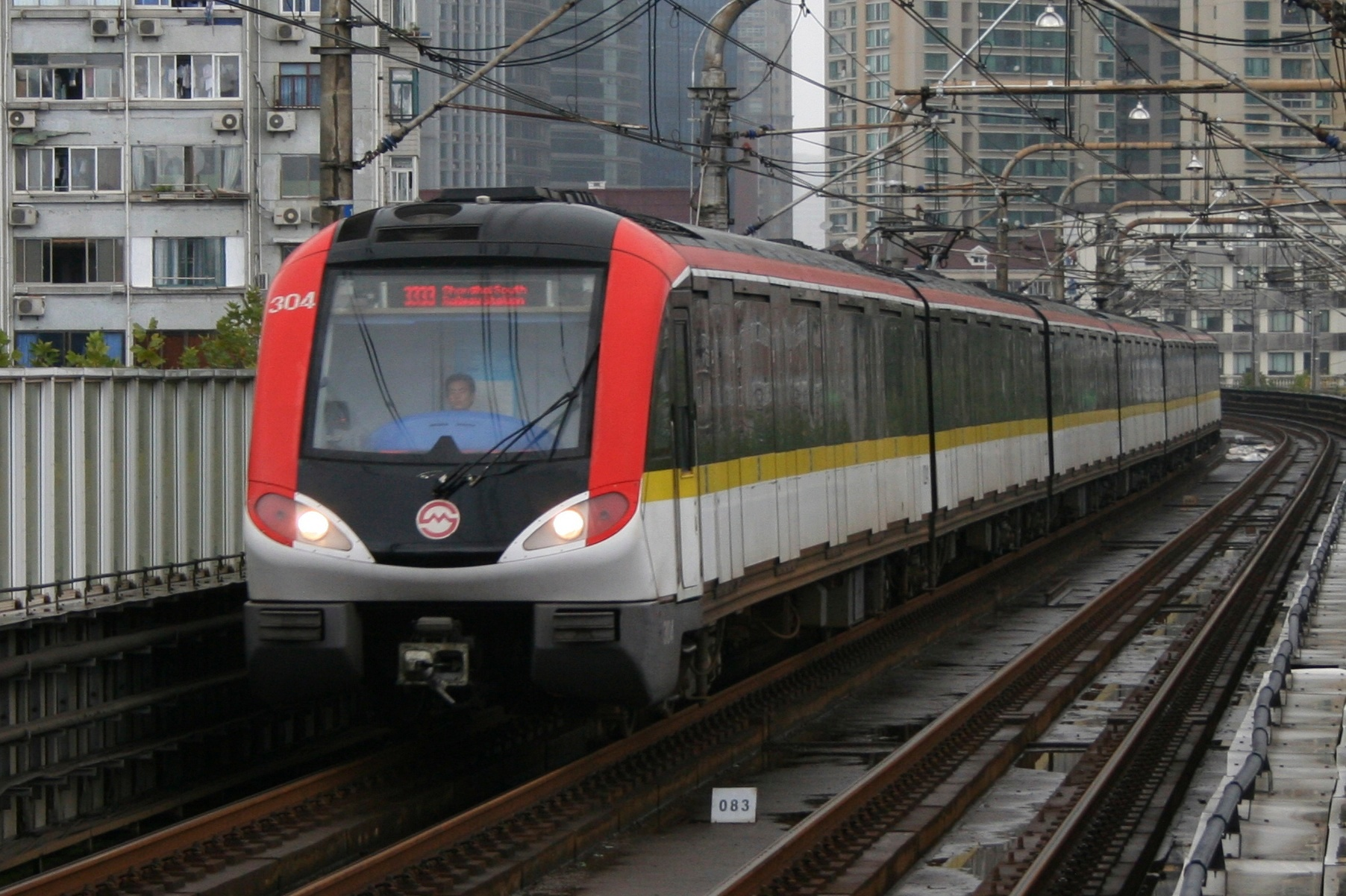
03A01 train

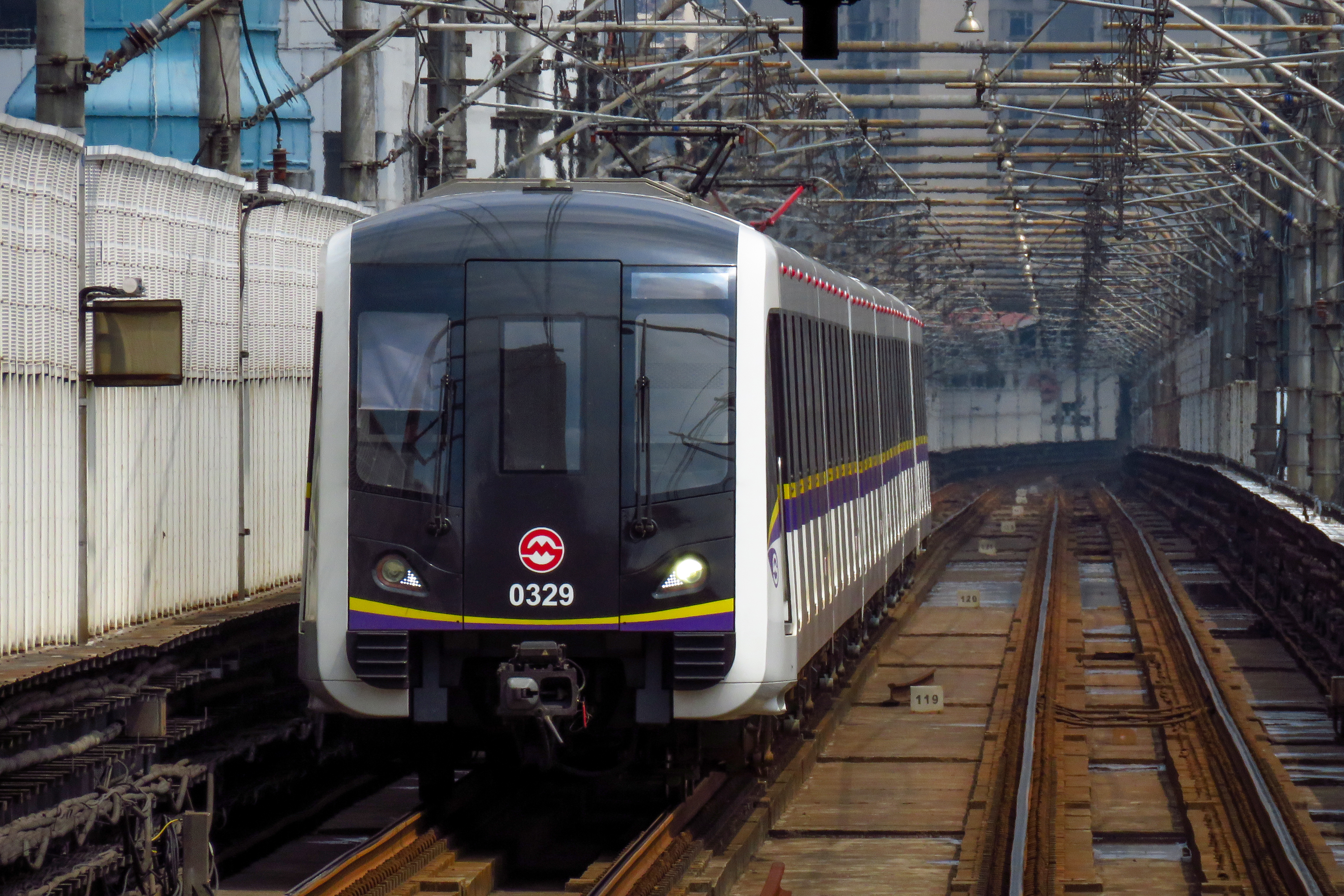
03A02 train

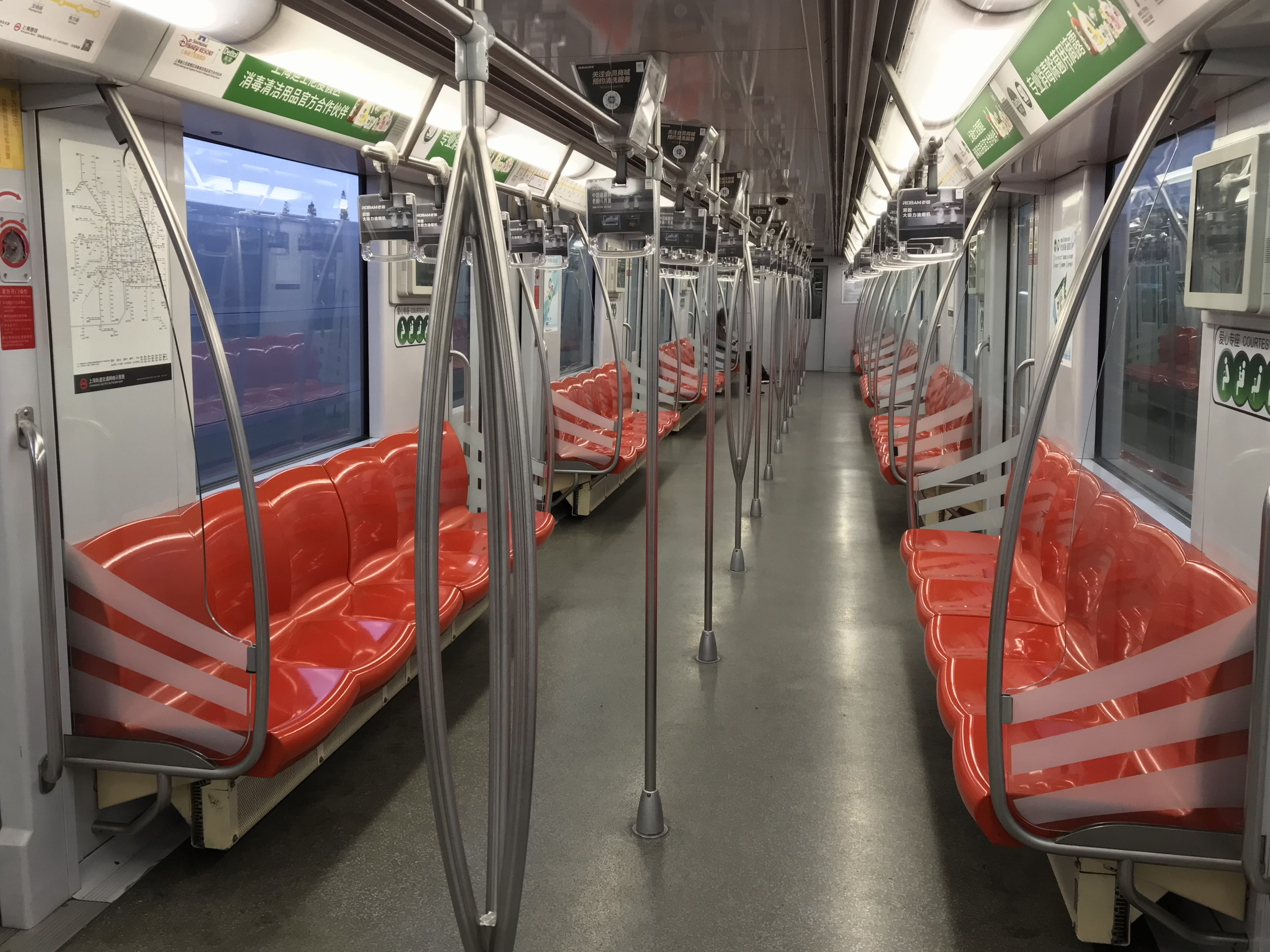
03A01 train interior before renovation
