= Wenzaobang =

River in Shanghai, China

The Wenzaobang or Wenzao River (Chinese: 蕰藻浜; pinyin: Wēnzǎobāng), often mispronounced as Yunzaobang, is a river in Shanghai, China. It flows from the Wusong River in Jiading District to the Huangpu River in Baoshan District and is 38 kilometres (24 mi) in length.
