= Shanghai–Nanjing railway =

Railway in China

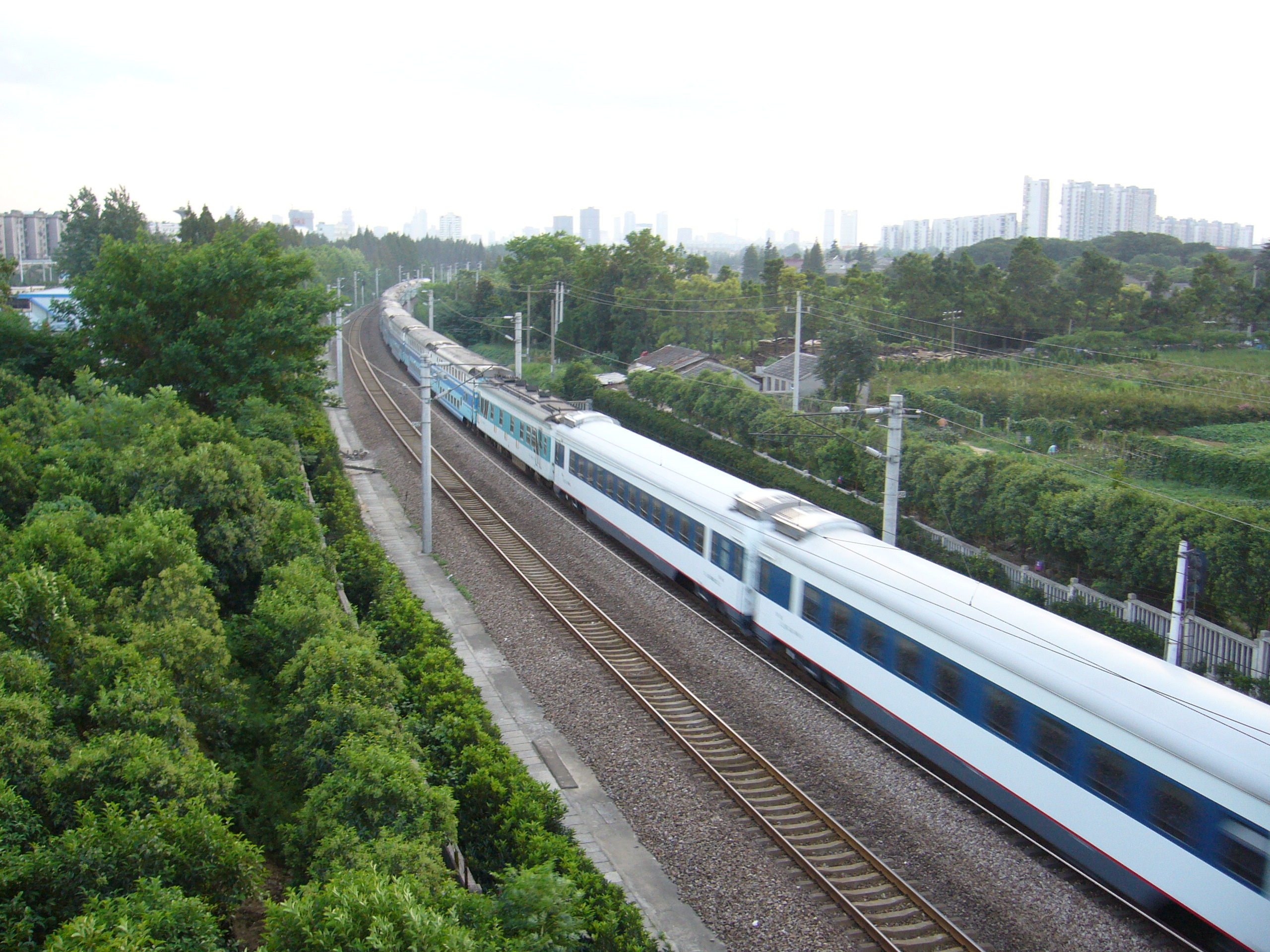
Shanghai Nanjing Railway

The Shanghai–Nanjing or Huning Railway (Note: Chinese: t 滬寧鐡路, s 沪宁铁路, p Hù–Níng Tiělù.) is a 1,435 mm (4 ft 8 1/2 in) standard gauge railway in China running from Shanghai to Nanjing, capital of Jiangsu province. The railway is about 307 kilometers (191 mi) long. The Huning line is one of the busiest in China.

The Shanghai–Nanjing intercity railway runs along the same route, but on separate tracks.

Its Chinese name is derived from the character abbreviations Hù (s 沪, t 滬) for Shanghai and Níng (s 宁, t 寧) for Nanjing.

== History ==
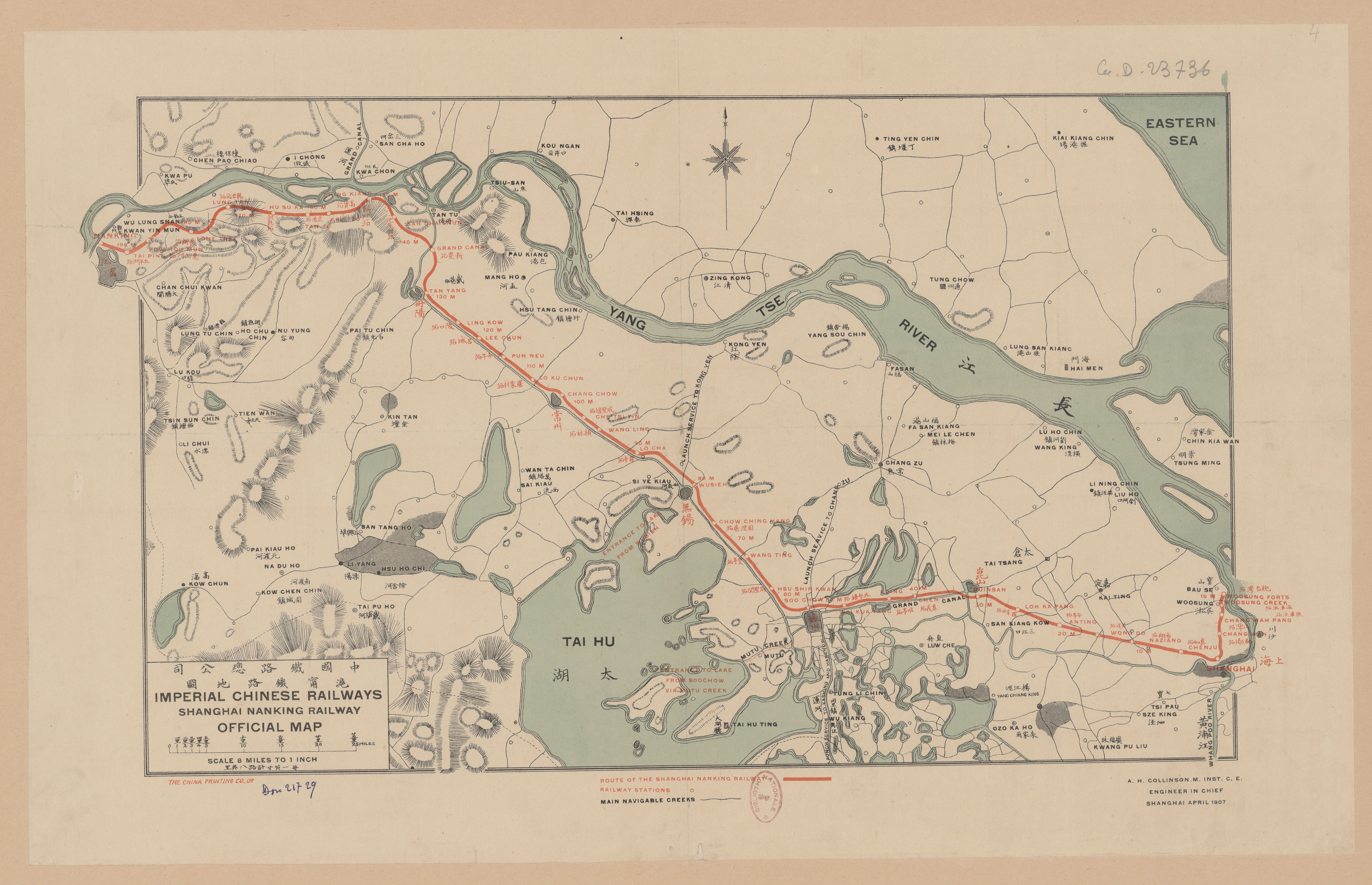
1907 map of the Shanghai–Nanjing Railway

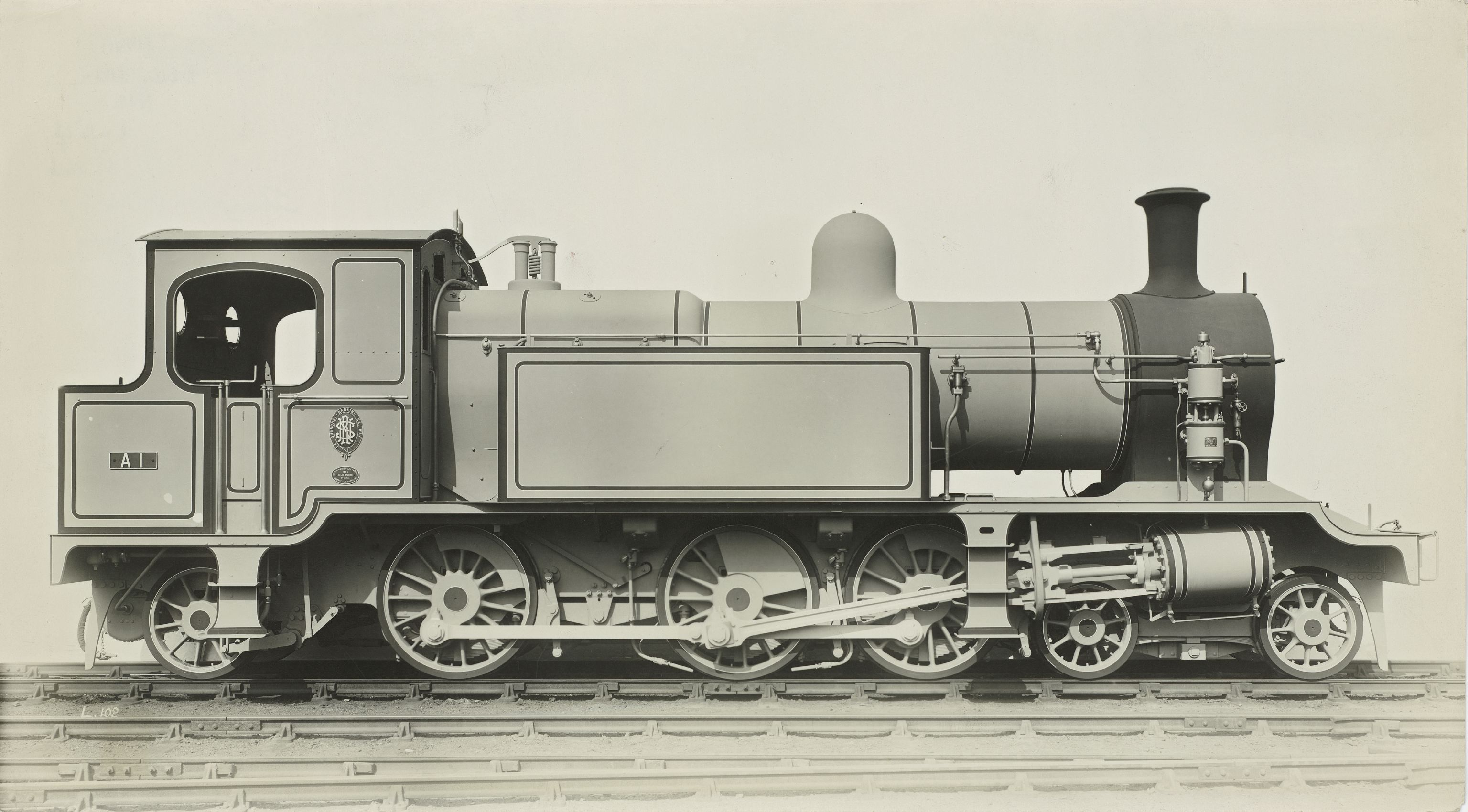
The Shanghai–Nanjing Railway Locomotive A1 (1904)

Such a railway had long been desired by Western interests in 19th-century China and just as long opposed by the Qing government. Following China's disastrous failure in the First Sino-Japanese War, however, the Songhu Railway from Shanghai was extended to Nanjing. The project was undertaken by the civil engineering partnership Sir John Wolfe-Barry and Lt Col Arthur John Barry at the end of the nineteenth century. Its former eastern terminus at the Old North Station in Shanghai's Zhabei District (the former American district of the International Settlement) is now the Shanghai Railway Museum.

From 1928 to 1949, while Nanjing was the capital of the Republic of China, the line was known as the Jinghu Railway, (Note: Chinese: t 京滬鐡路, s 京沪铁路, p Jīng–Hù Tiělù.) a name now reserved for the line between Beijing and Shanghai. In 2007 during the Sixth Railway Speed-Up Campaign, the line was organized into the Beijing–Shanghai railway

== See also ==
- Jinghu Railway, the modern railway between Beijing and Shanghai
- Shanghai–Nanjing intercity railway
