= Baoshan, Shanghai =

Baoshan 宝山区; 寶山區 Paoshan
- District
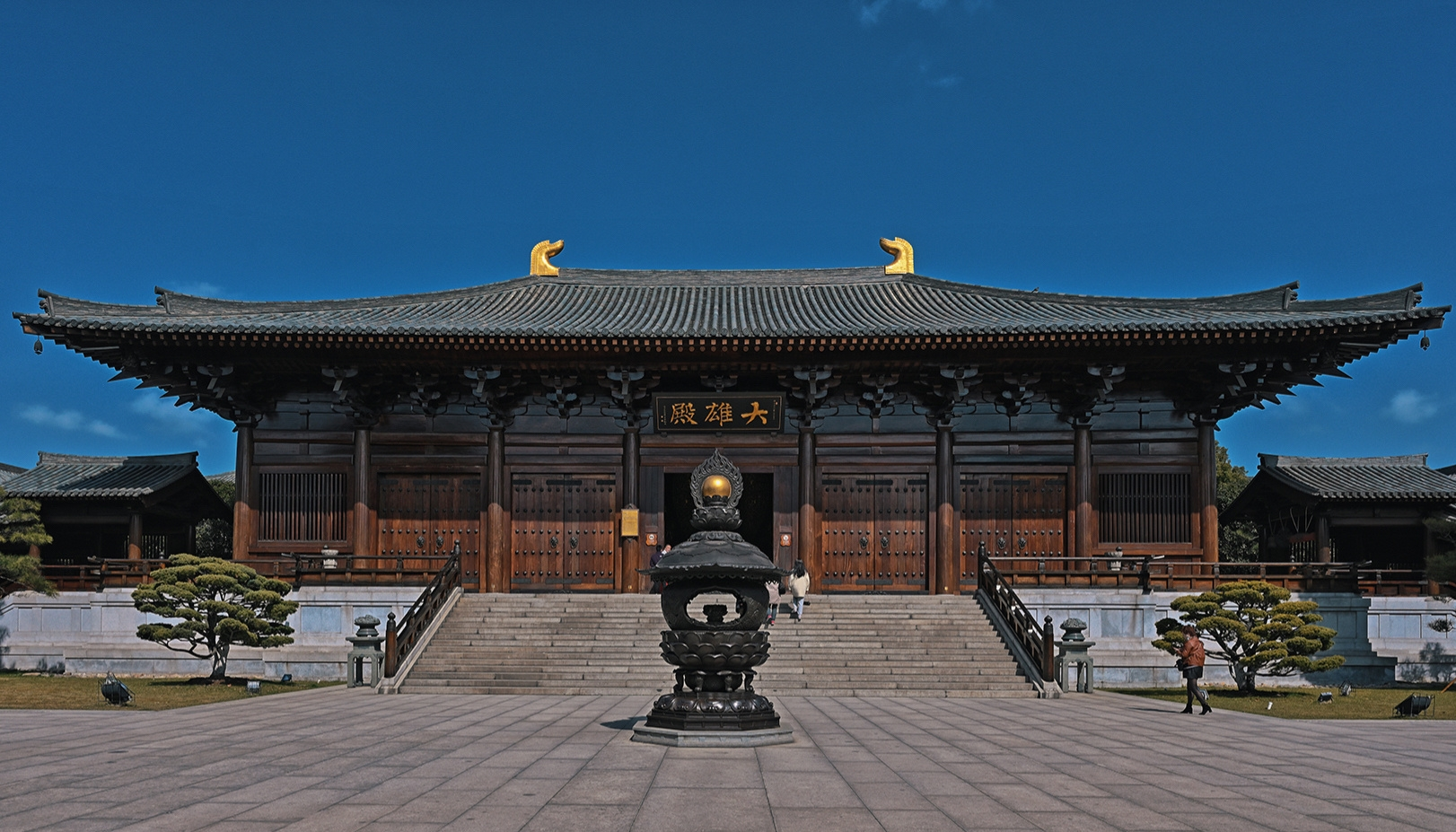
- Baoshan Temple

- Baoshan in Shanghai
- Coordinates (Baoshan government): 31°24′N 121°25′E
- Country: People's Republic of China
- Municipality: Shanghai

Area
  - Total: 424.58 km^{2} (163.93 sq mi)

Population (2020 Census)
  - Total: 2,235,218
  - Density: 5,264.5/km^{2} (13,635/sq mi)
- Time zone: UTC+8 (China Standard)

Baoshan
- Traditional Chinese: 寶山區
- Simplified Chinese: 宝山区
- Wugniu: pau^{3} sae^{1} chiu^{1}
- Postal: Paoshan
Transcriptions
Standard Mandarin
- Hanyu Pinyin: Bǎoshān Qū
Wu
- Wugniu: pau^{3} sae^{1} chiu^{1}
- IPA: Shanghainese: [pɔ˧ se˦ tɕʰy˨]
Yue: Cantonese
- Jyutping: bou^{2} saan^{1} keoi^{1}

Baoshan is a suburban district of Shanghai. It has an area of 424.58 square kilometers (163.93 sq mi) and had a population of 2,235,218 at the time of the 2020 Chinese census.

== History ==
The area was the scene of heavy fighting during the Battle of Shanghai.

== Landmarks ==
The War of Resistance Memorial Park on Donglin Lu has a small museum with artifacts from the Second World War and a modern glass-and-steel pagoda. The Wisdom Bay Industrial Park has the world's largest concrete 3D printed pedestrian bridge.

In 2009, Gucun Park opened. It is famous for the Cherry Blossom Festival.

== Education ==
The main campus of Shanghai University is located in Baoshan District. One of several schools in the district, Xing Zhi Middle School was founded by the famous educationalist from Nanjing, Tao Xingzhi. Shanghai Xingzhi High School and the High School Affiliated to Shanghai University are also located in the district.

== Transport ==
Baoshan District is served by the Shanghai Metro. There are 4 lines from Baoshan to central Shanghai—Line 1, Line 3, Line 7, and Line 15 —which operate as subways and elevated rail in different parts of the district. The 952B rapid bus runs from the district to People's Square in central Shanghai, being one of the many buses that link the district to central Shanghai.

Ferries to Chongming Island operate from Wusong, Baoyang Rd, and Shidongkou. Ferries to Putuoshan from Wusong are also available.

== Economy ==
The district is home to Baosteel Group's original factory, still a major producer of iron and steel. Rovio Entertainment has its China offices in Baoshan District. The Shidongkou Power Station (石洞口发电厂) is located along the Yangtze.

== Government ==
=== Subdivisions ===
Name	Chinese (S)	Hanyu Pinyin	Shanghainese Romanization	Population (2010)	Area (km^{2})
Youyi Road Subdistrict	友谊路街道	Yǒuyìlù Jiēdào	yoe gnij lu ka do	136,814	10.45
Wusong Subdistrict	吴淞街道	Wúsōng Jiēdào	wu son ka do	104,162	7.52
Zhangmiao Subdistrict	张庙街道	Zhāngmiào Jiēdào	tzan mio ka do	172,284	5.19
Luodian town	罗店镇	Luōdiàn Zhèn	lu ti tzen	118,323	44.19
Dachang town	大场镇	Dàchǎng Zhèn	da dzan tzen	371,856	27.22
Yanghang town	杨行镇	Yángxíng Zhèn	yan raon tzen	204,564	37.91
Yuepu town	月浦镇	Yuèpǔ Zhèn	yuq phu tzen	139,328	47.34
Luojing town	罗泾镇	Luōjīng Zhèn	lu cin tzen	54,329	47.68
Gucun town	顾村镇	Gùcūn Zhèn	ku tsen tzen	240,185	41.66
Gaojing town	高境镇	Gāojìng Zhèn	ko cin tzen	127,512	11.23
Miaohang town	庙行镇	Miàoxíng Zhèn	mio raon tzen	89,615	5.96
Songnan town	淞南镇	Sōngnán Zhèn	son neu tzen	127,347	13.65
Baoshan City Industrial Park	宝山城市工业园区	Bǎoshān Chéngshì Gōngyè Yuánqū	po se zen zy kon gniq yeu chiu	18,567	4.35

== Transportation ==
=== Metro ===
Baoshan is currently served by four metro lines operated by Shanghai Metro:

- Line 1 - Tonghe Xincun, Hulan Road, Gongfu Xincun, Bao'an Highway, West Youyi Road, Fujin Road
- Line 3 - West Yingao Road, South Changjiang Road 18 , Songfa Road, Zhanghuabang, Songbin Road, Shuichan Road, Baoyang Road, Youyi Road, Tieli Road, North Jiangyang Road
- Line 7 - Meilan Lake, Luonan Xincun, Panguang Road, Liuhang, Gucun Park, Qihua Road, Shanghai University, Nanchen Road, Shangda Road, Changzhong Road, Dachang Town, Xingzhi Road, Dahuasan Road
- Line 18 - South Changjiang Road 3 , Yingao Road

== Climate ==
Climate data for Baoshan District, elevation 6 m (20 ft), (1991–2020 normals, extremes 1951–present)
Month	Jan	Feb	Mar	Apr	May	Jun	Jul	Aug	Sep	Oct	Nov	Dec	Year
Record high °C (°F)	23.0 (73.4)	27.0 (80.6)	33.1 (91.6)	34.3 (93.7)	36.4 (97.5)	37.5 (99.5)	39.7 (103.5)	40.0 (104.0)	38.2 (100.8)	36.7 (98.1)	29.2 (84.6)	24.4 (75.9)	40.0 (104.0)
Mean daily maximum °C (°F)	8.2 (46.8)	10.1 (50.2)	14.3 (57.7)	20.1 (68.2)	25.1 (77.2)	27.8 (82.0)	32.4 (90.3)	31.9 (89.4)	27.9 (82.2)	22.9 (73.2)	17.5 (63.5)	11.0 (51.8)	20.8 (69.4)
Daily mean °C (°F)	4.9 (40.8)	6.5 (43.7)	10.3 (50.5)	15.7 (60.3)	20.9 (69.6)	24.4 (75.9)	28.8 (83.8)	28.5 (83.3)	24.7 (76.5)	19.7 (67.5)	13.9 (57.0)	7.5 (45.5)	17.2 (62.9)
Mean daily minimum °C (°F)	2.2 (36.0)	3.6 (38.5)	6.9 (44.4)	12.0 (53.6)	17.5 (63.5)	21.7 (71.1)	25.9 (78.6)	25.9 (78.6)	22.2 (72.0)	16.7 (62.1)	10.7 (51.3)	4.4 (39.9)	14.1 (57.5)
Record low °C (°F)	−10.1 (13.8)	−7.9 (17.8)	−5.4 (22.3)	−0.5 (31.1)	6.9 (44.4)	12.3 (54.1)	16.3 (61.3)	18.3 (64.9)	10.8 (51.4)	1.7 (35.1)	−4.2 (24.4)	−8.5 (16.7)	−10.1 (13.8)
Average precipitation mm (inches)	69.8 (2.75)	64.0 (2.52)	86.5 (3.41)	77.1 (3.04)	90.2 (3.55)	196.7 (7.74)	146.9 (5.78)	210.1 (8.27)	116.5 (4.59)	71.4 (2.81)	57.5 (2.26)	49.3 (1.94)	1,236 (48.66)
Average precipitation days (≥ 0.1 mm)	10.0	9.7	12.2	10.6	10.8	13.7	11.9	12.5	9.9	7.0	8.6	8.1	125
Average snowy days	1.9	1.4	0.4	0.1	0	0	0	0	0	0	0.1	0.7	4.6
Average relative humidity (%)	73	73	72	70	71	79	76	77	75	71	72	71	73
Mean monthly sunshine hours	110.4	115.4	136.6	157.0	169.7	120.7	184.7	186.5	161.2	157.6	127.1	127.1	1,754
Percentage possible sunshine	34	37	37	40	40	28	43	46	44	45	40	41	40
Source: China Meteorological Administration

== See also ==
- Wusong
