= Jiangwan Town station =

Shanghai Metro station

Jiangwan Town 江湾镇
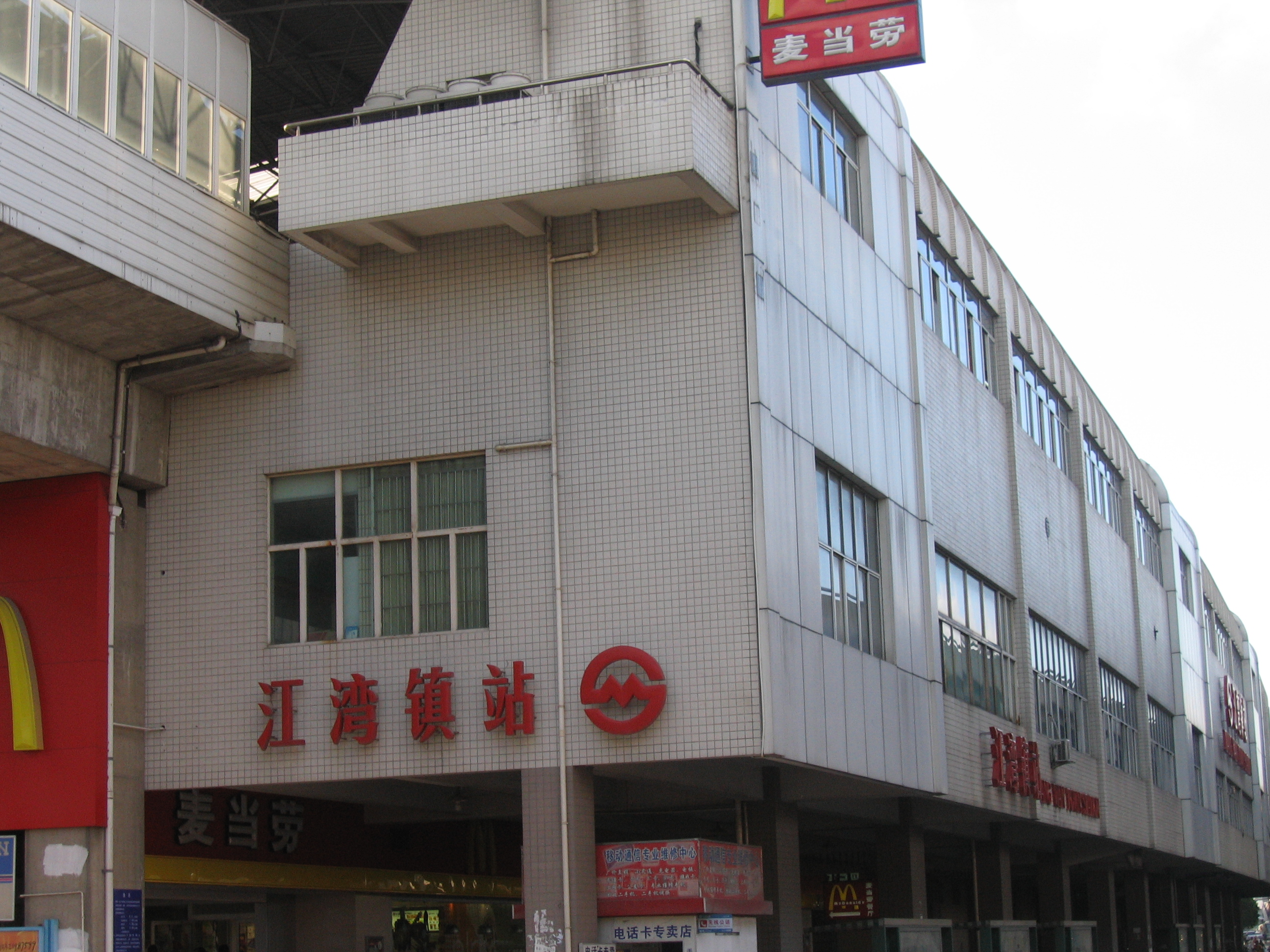
- Station exterior

General information
- Location: Yixian Road (逸仙路) and Yangzhong Road (场中路); Hongkou District, Shanghai; China
- Coordinates: 31°18′21″N 121°29′07″E
- Operator: Shanghai No. 3 Metro Operation Co. Ltd.
- Line: Line 3
- Platforms: 2 (2 side platforms)
- Tracks: 2

Construction
- Structure type: Elevated
- Accessible: Yes

History
- Opened: 26 December 2000; 25 years ago

Services
Preceding station	Shanghai Metro	Following station
West Yingao Road towards North Jiangyang Road	Line 3	Dabaishu towards Shanghai South Railway Station
Location
- Location within Shanghai

Jiangwan Town (simplified Chinese: 江湾镇; traditional Chinese: 江灣鎮; pinyin: Jiāngwān Zhèn) is a station on Shanghai Metro Line 3. It served as the northern terminus of Line 3 from its opening on 26 December 2000 until 18 December 2006, when the northern extension to North Jiangyang Road opened. Next to this station is a big supermarket with a lot of small clothes stores and some dinner locations. This station is used by people from a relatively large area, including many students living on Fudan University and Tongji University campuses before the opening of Line 10 and Line 18. Both of these are less than 20 minutes' walk away.

== Station Layout ==
G	Entrances and Exits	Exits 1-7
2F	Concourse	Faregates, Station Agent
3F	Side Platform, doors open on the right
3F	Southbound	← Line 3 towards Shanghai South Railway Station (Dabaishu)
3F	Northbound	Line 3 towards North Jiangyang Road (West Yingao Road) →
3F	Side Platform, doors open on the right
