= North Jiangyang Road station =

Shanghai Metro station

North Jiangyang Road 江杨北路
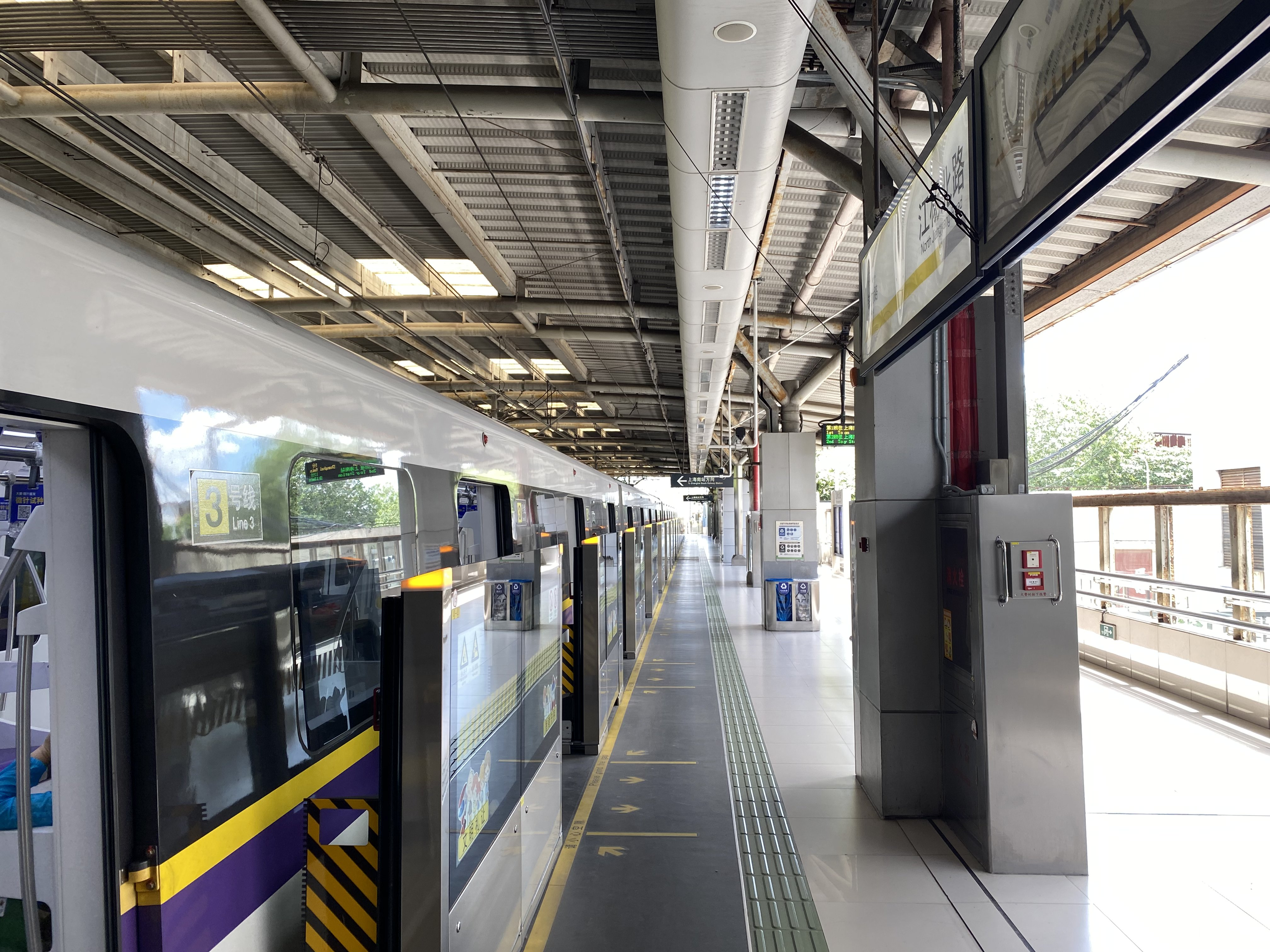
- Station platform

General information
- Location: North Jiangyang Road and Suihua Road (绥化路); Baoshan District, Shanghai; China
- Coordinates: 31°24′28″N 121°26′23″E
- Operator: Shanghai No. 3 Metro Operation Co., Ltd.
- Line: Line 3
- Platforms: 2 (2 side platforms)
- Tracks: 2

Construction
- Structure type: At-grade
- Accessible: Yes

History
- Opened: 18 December 2006; 19 years ago

Services
Preceding station	Shanghai Metro	Following station
Terminus	Line 3	Tieli Road towards Shanghai South Railway Station
Location
- Location within Shanghai

North Jiangyang Road (simplified Chinese: 江杨北路; traditional Chinese: 江楊北路; pinyin: Jiāngyáng Běi Lù) is the name of a station on the Shanghai Metro Line 3. It is the northern terminus of the line, and part of the northern extension of the line from Jiangwan Town that opened on 18 December 2006.
