= Shanghai South Railway Station metro station =

Shanghai Metro interchange station

Shanghai South Railway Station 上海南站
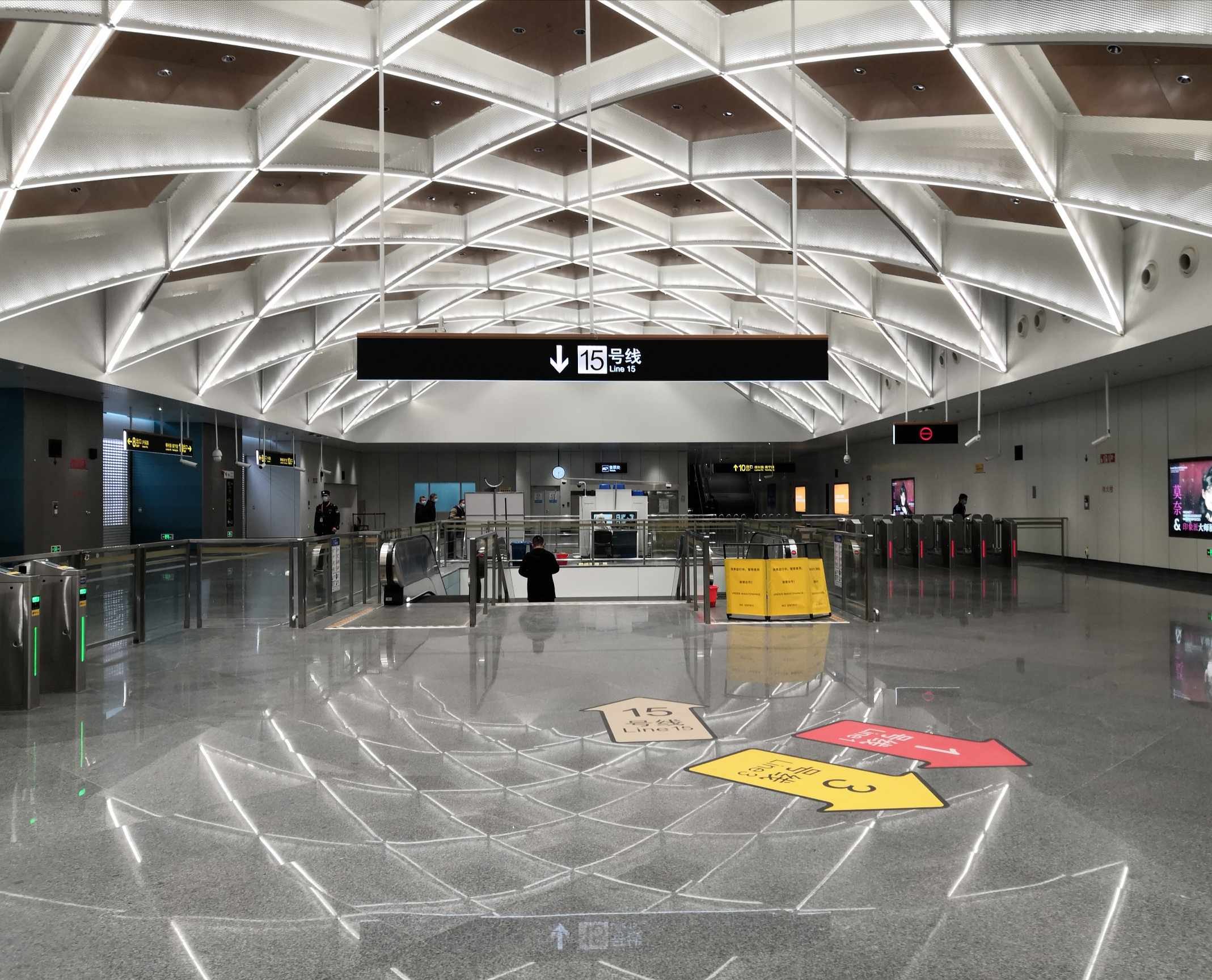
- Line 15 Concourse

General information
- Location: Xuhui District, Shanghai; China
- Coordinates: 31°09′16″N 121°25′48″E
- Operator: Shanghai No. 1/3 Metro Operation Co. Ltd.
- Lines: Line 1; Line 3; Line 15
- Platforms: 6 (3 island platforms)
- Tracks: 6
- Connections: Shanghai South Railway station (SNH); Jinshan

Construction
- Structure type: Underground (Line 1, 15); At-grade (Line 3)
- Accessible: Yes

Other information
- Station code: L01/05(Line 1) L03/01(Line 3)

History
- Opened: 28 May 1993 (Line 1); 26 December 2000 (Line 3); 23 January 2021 (Line 15)
- Former names: Xinlonghua (up to 26 December 2000)

Services
| Preceding station | Shanghai Metro | Following station |
|---|---|---|
| Caobao Road towards Fujin Road | Line 1 | Jinjiang Park towards Xinzhuang |
| Shilong Road towards North Jiangyang Road | Line 3 | Terminus |
| Guilin Park towards Gucun Park | Line 15 | East China University of Science and Technology towards Zizhu Hi-tech Park |
Location
- Location within Shanghai

Shanghai South Railway Station (Chinese: 上海南站; pinyin: Shànghǎi Nánzhàn) is an interchange station between Lines 1, 3 and 15 of the Shanghai Metro. It is the southern terminus of Line 3.

Both the metro station and the associated railway station were formerly named Xinlonghua (simplified Chinese: 新龙华; traditional Chinese: 新龍華; pinyin: Xīnlónghuá) when Line 1 first opened on 28 May 1993. The interchange with Line 3 opened with the opening of that line on 26 December 2000. The interchange with line 15 opened on 23 January 2021.

== Places nearby ==
- Shanghai South railway station

== Gallery ==
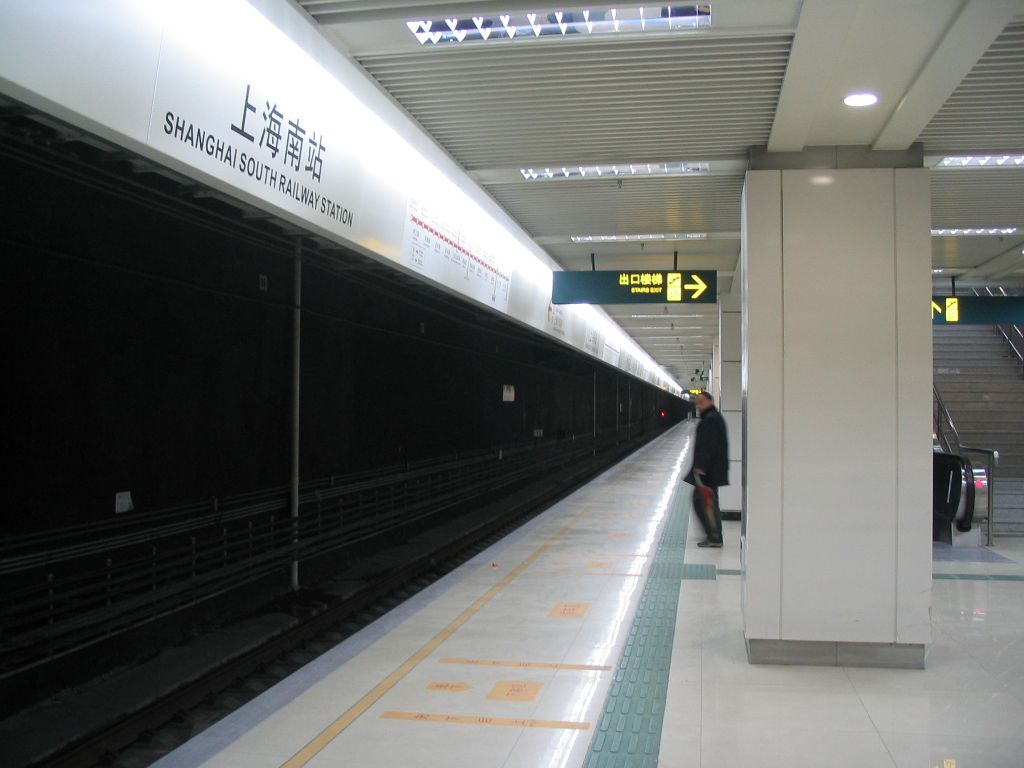
Line 1 platform in 2005

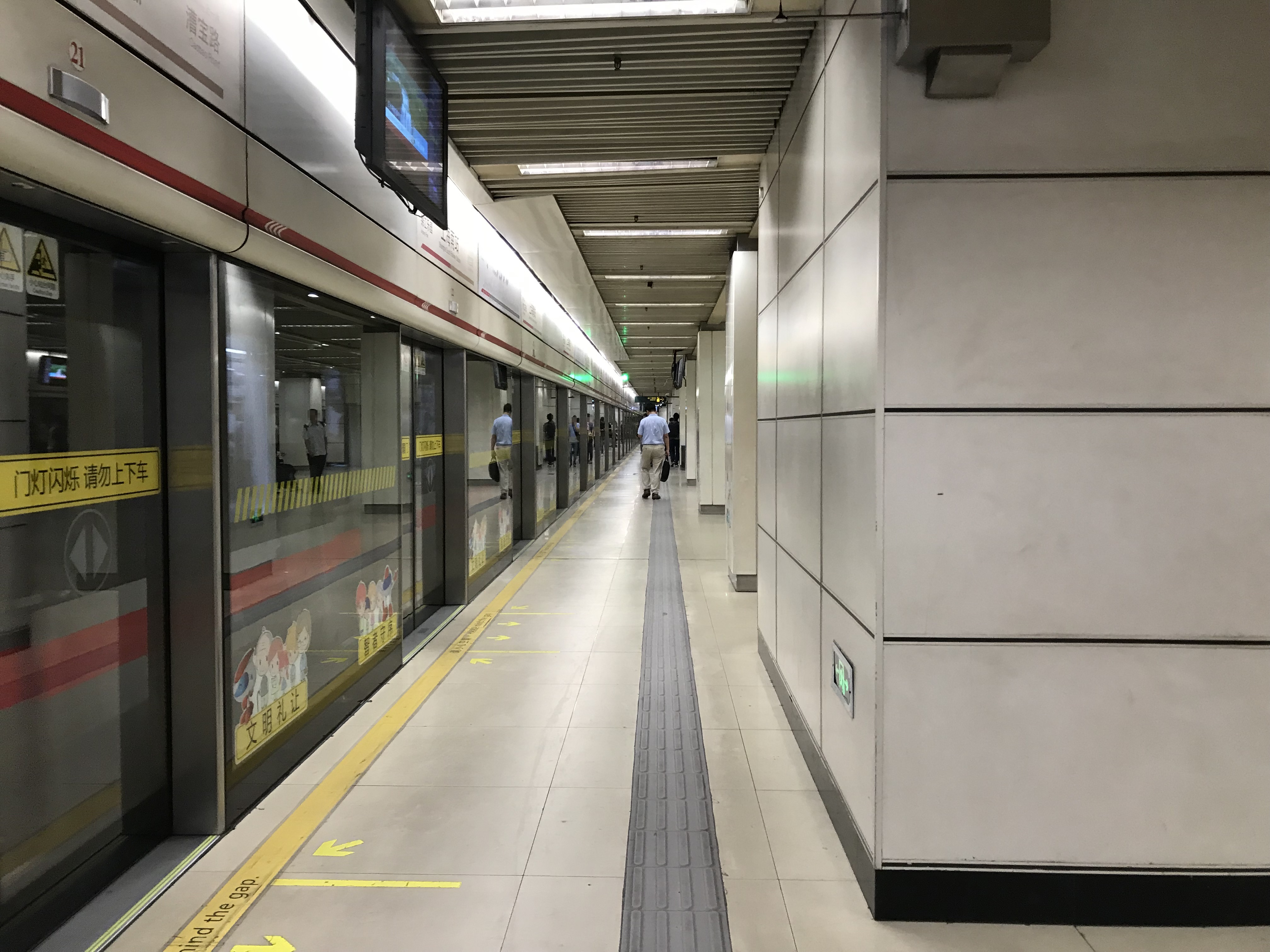
Line 1 platform in 2018

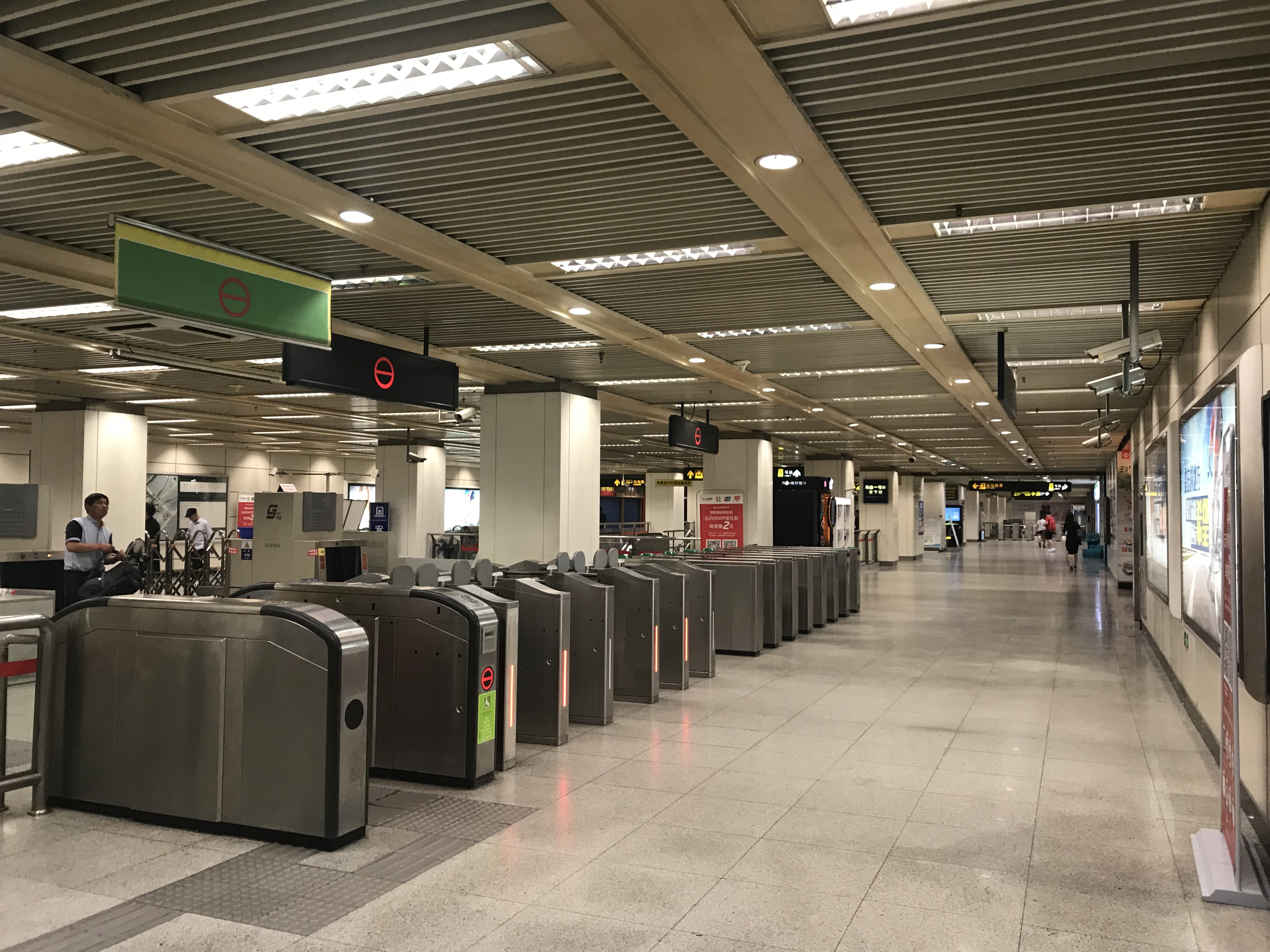
Concourse

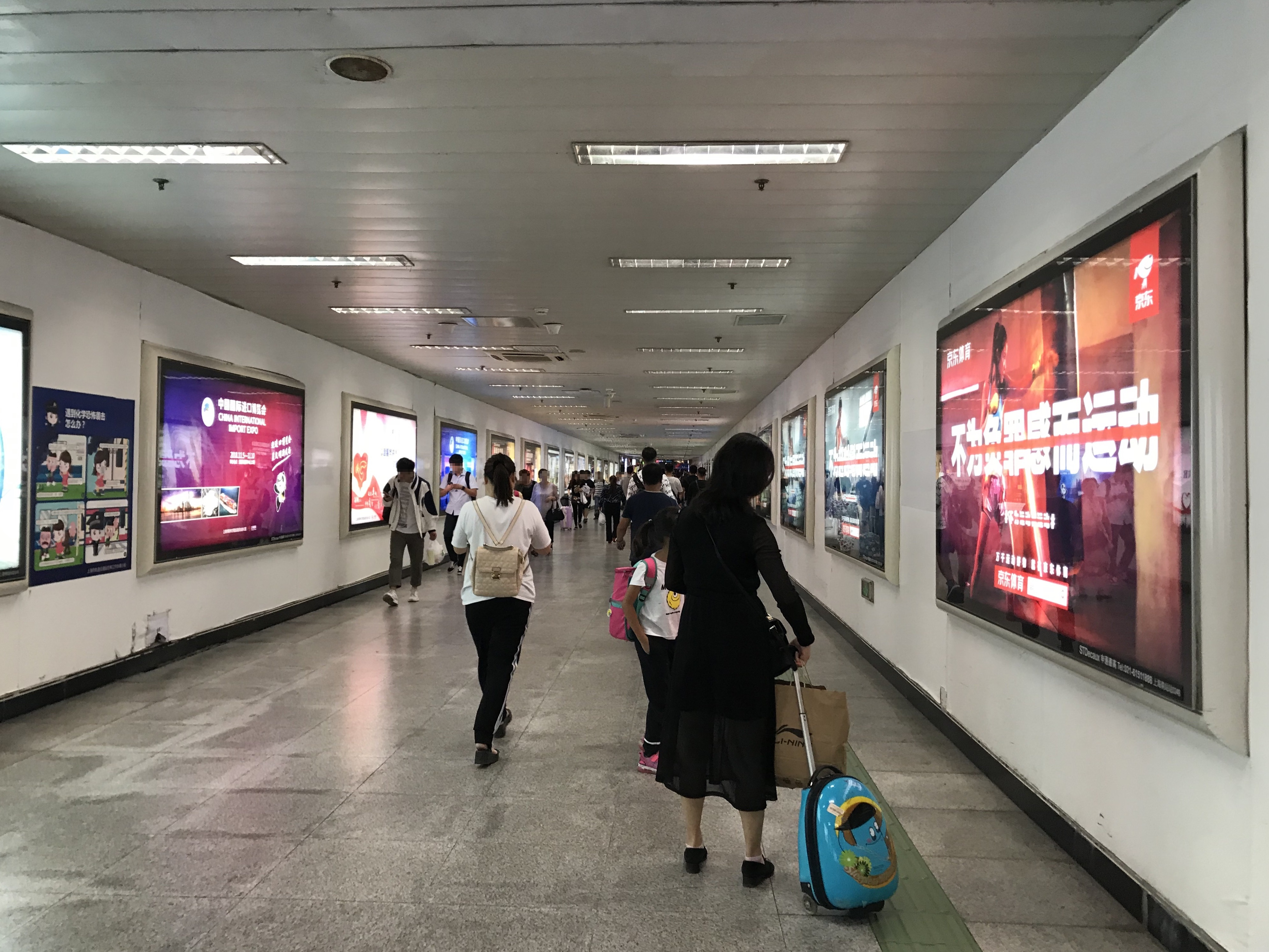
Transfer Corridor

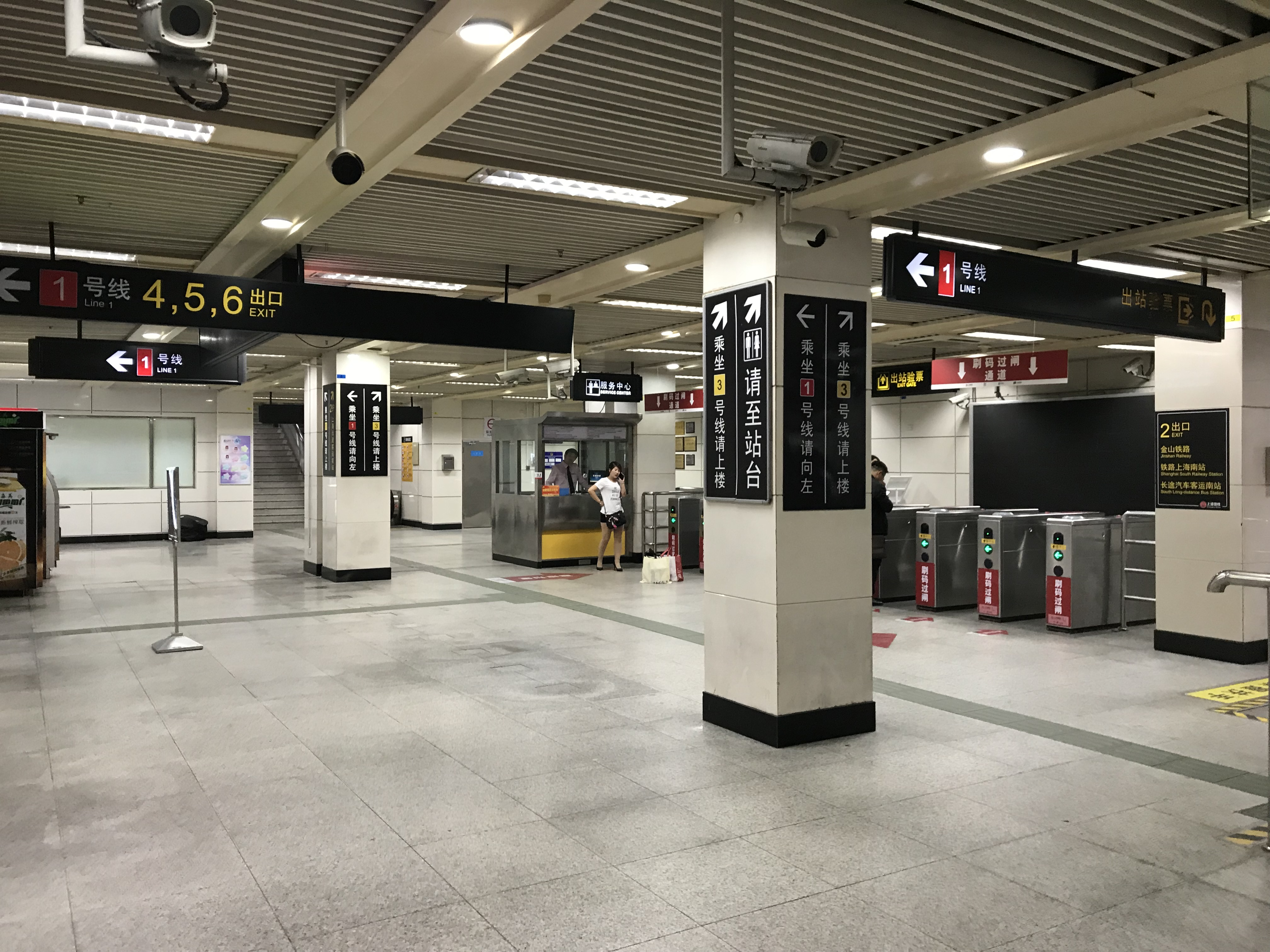
Line 3 Concourse

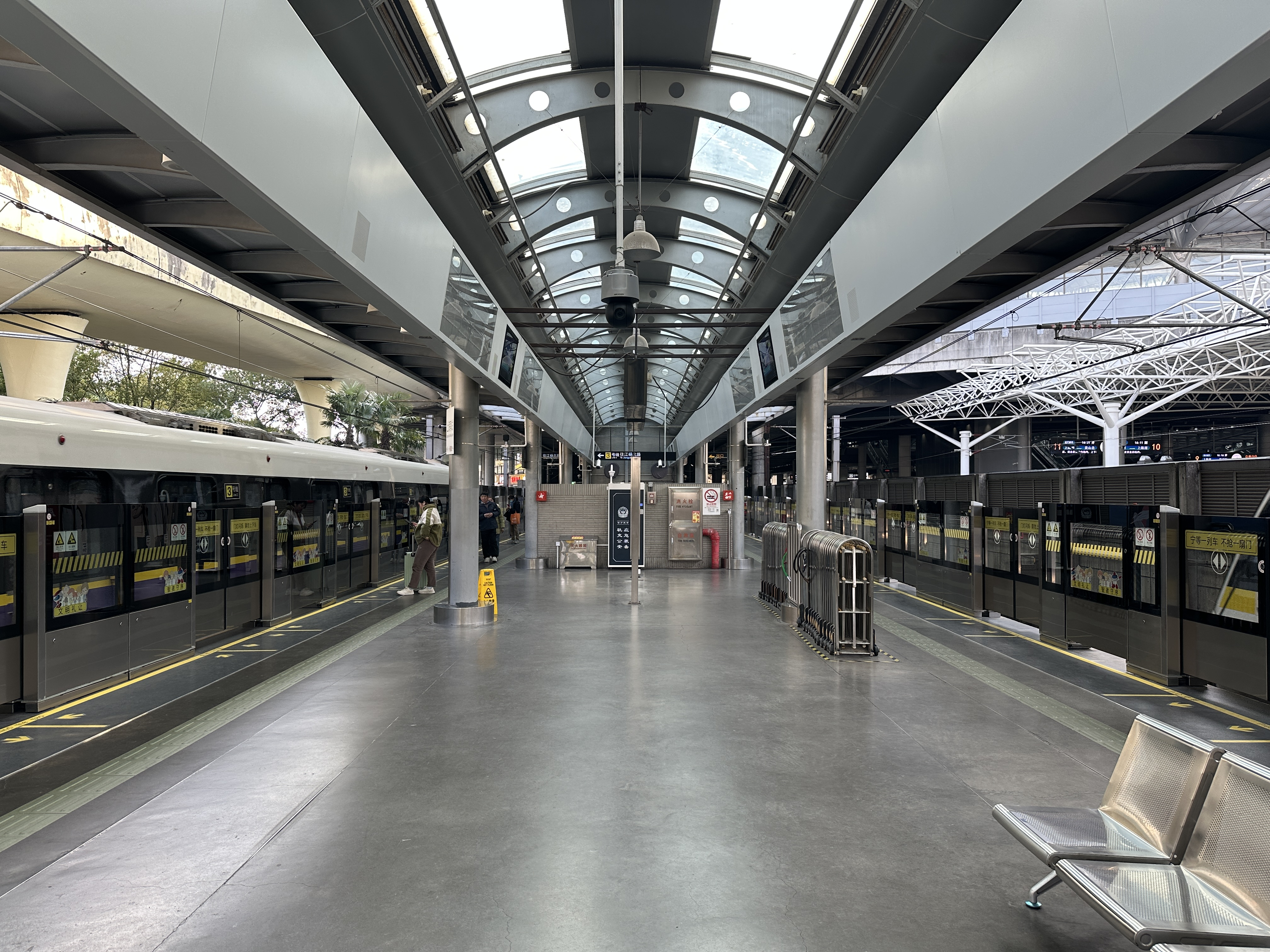
Line 3 Platform

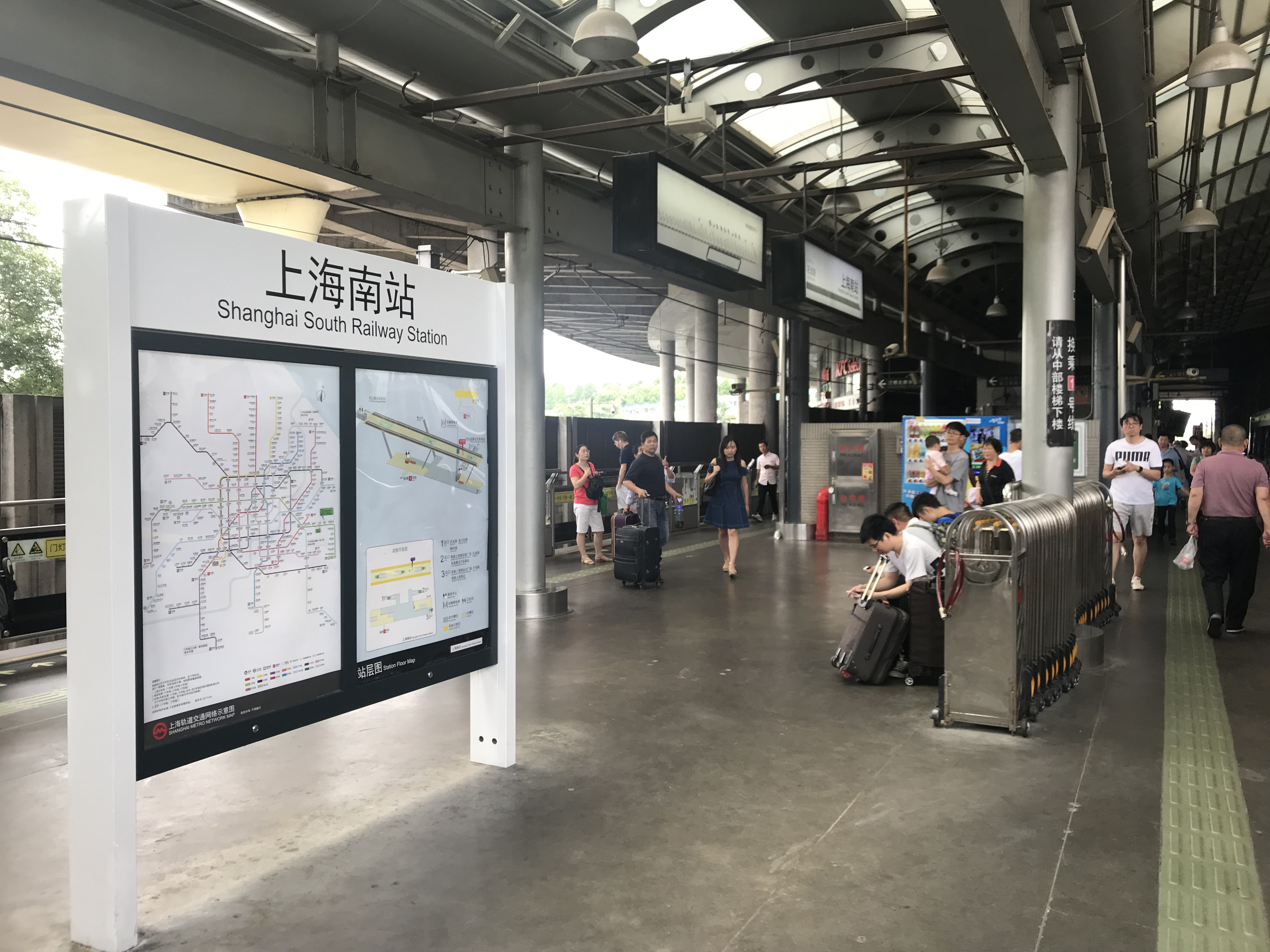
Line 3 Station Signage

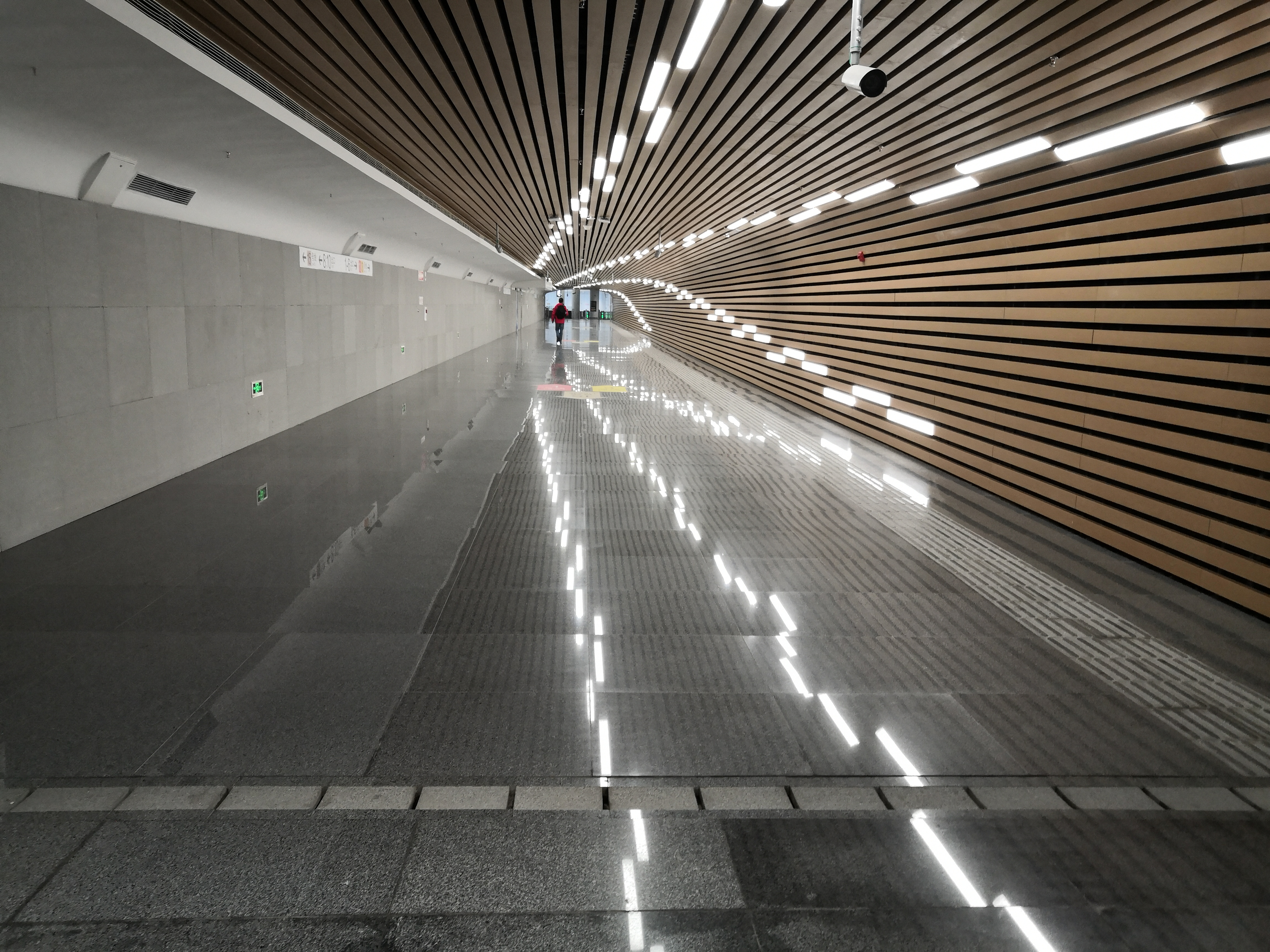
Line 15 Transfer Corridor

Line 15 Platform, towards Zizhu Hi-tech Park
