= Shanghai Circus World station =

Shanghai Metro station

Shanghai Circus World 上海马戏城
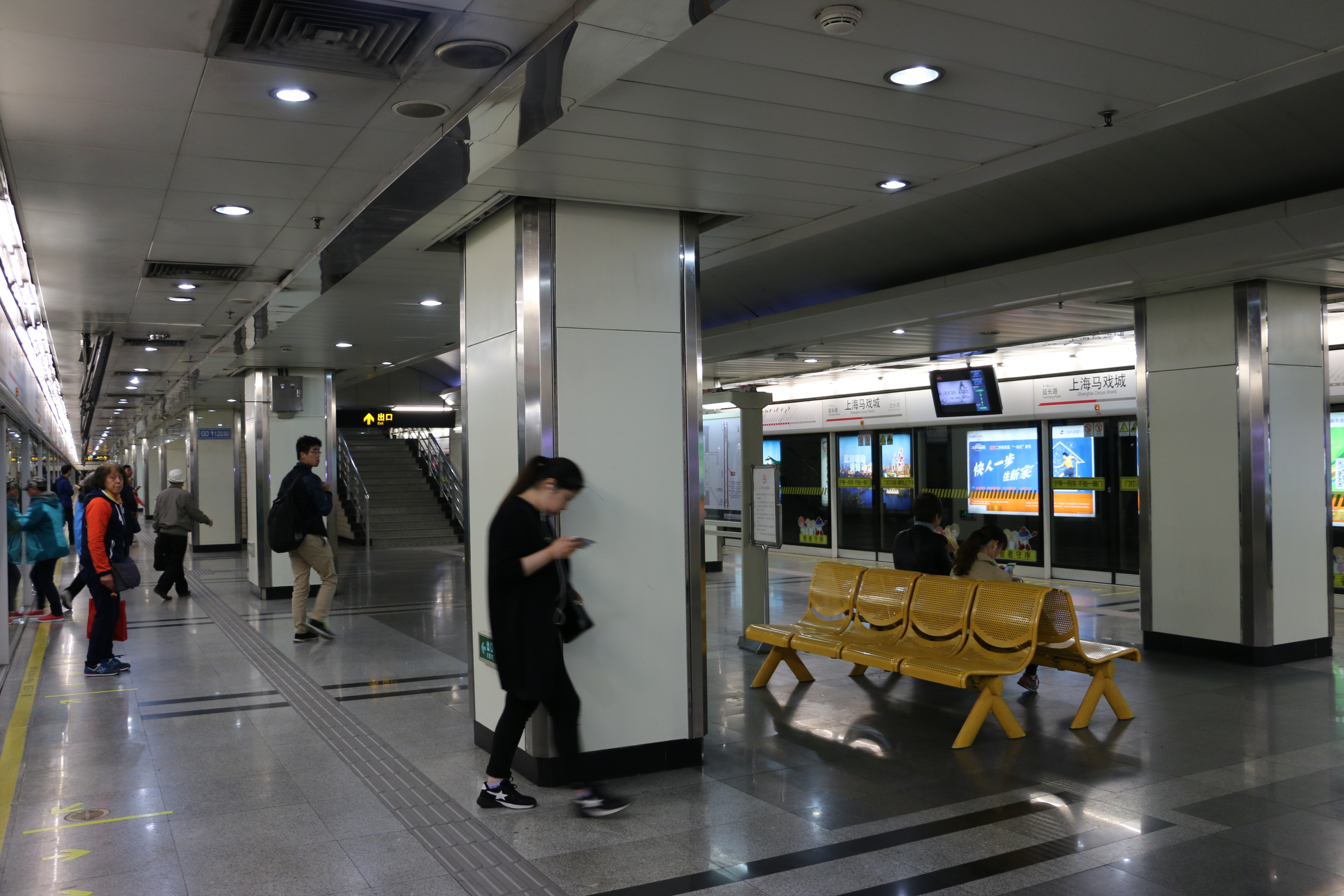
- Station platform

General information
- Location: Gonghexin Road and West Guangzhong Road (广中西路); Jing'an District, Shanghai; China
- Coordinates: 31°16′44″N 121°27′11″E
- Operator: Shanghai No. 1 Metro Operation Co. Ltd.
- Line: Line 1
- Platforms: 2 (1 island platform)
- Tracks: 2

Construction
- Structure type: Underground
- Accessible: Yes

Other information
- Station code: L01/19

History
- Opened: 28 December 2004

Services
Preceding station	Shanghai Metro	Following station
Wenshui Road towards Fujin Road	Line 1	Yanchang Road towards Xinzhuang
Location
- Location within Shanghai

Shanghai Circus World (Chinese: 上海马戏城; pinyin: Shànghǎi Mǎxì Chéng) is a metro station on Shanghai Metro Line 1 in the former Zhabei District, now Jing'an District. It entered operation on 28 December 2004, as part of a northern extension of Line 1 from Shanghai Railway Station to Gongfu Xincun.

The station is named after the Shanghai Circus World, an indoor circus near the station. Other points of interest nearby include Guangzhong Park and Zhabei Stadium.

== Exit list ==
Shanghai Circus World station Exit List
Exit No.	Location	Attractions
Exit 1	East side of Gonghexin Road, south of Lingshi Road	
Exit 2	East side of Gonghexin Road, north of Guangzhong Road	
Exit 3	West side of Gonghexin Road, north of Guangzhong Road	Guangzhong Park, Shanghai Circus World, Zhabei Stadium
Exit 4	West side of Gonghexin Road, south of Lingshi Road	
