= Shanghai Metro AC06 =

Rolling stock of Shanghai Metro Line 1

Shanghai Metro 01A05 AC06
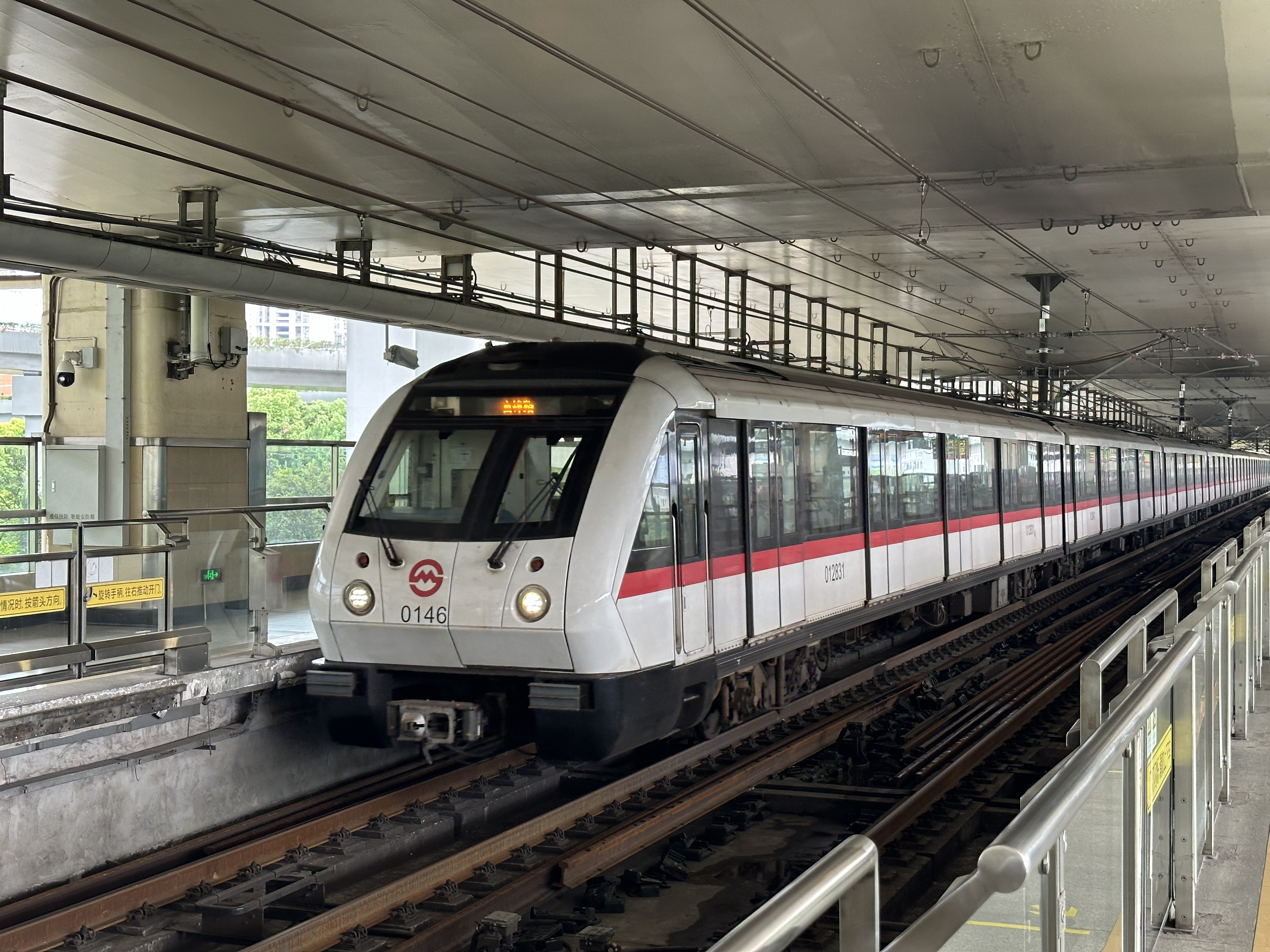
- 01A05 at Wenshui Road station in 2024
- Stock type: Class A EMU
- In service: 31 January 2007-present
- Manufacturer: Alstom and CSR Nanjing Puzhen
- Built at: Nanjing and Shanghai, China
- Family name: Metropolis
- Constructed: 2006-2007
- Entered service: 31 January 2007
- Number built: 128
- Number in service: 128
- Formation: Tc-Mp-M-Mp+Mp-M-Mp-Tc
- Fleet numbers: 012351-013621
- Capacity: 310 per car
- Operators: Shentong Metro Group
- Depots: Meilong Depot; Fujin Road Yard
- Lines served: 1

Specifications
- Car body construction: Aluminum alloy
- Train length: 139.98 m (459 ft 3 in)
- Car length: 23.54 m (77 ft 3 in)
- Width: 3 m (9 ft 10 in)
- Height: 3.8 m (12 ft 6 in)
- Doors: Electric doors
- Maximum speed: 80 km/h (50 mph)
- Traction system: Alstom ONIX 1500 IGBT-VVVF
- Traction motors: Alstom 4LCA-2138 3-phases AC induction motors
- Acceleration: Maximum 0.9 km/(h⋅s) (0.559 mph/s)
- Deceleration: 1 km/(h⋅s) (0.621 mph/s) (service); 1.3 km/(h⋅s) (0.808 mph/s) (emergency)
- Electric system(s): 1,500 V DC
- Current collection: Single-arm Pantograph
- Bogies: Alstom B25
- Safety system(s): Current: GRS Micro Cabmatic (Fixed-block, ATO/GoA2); Future: CASCO Tranavi (CBTC, DTO/GoA3)
- Track gauge: 4 ft 8 1/2 in (1,435 mm)

The 01A05 (formerly known as AC06) is an electric multiple unit currently used on Line 1 of Shanghai Metro. They are developed by Alstom and built by CSR Nanjing Puzhen. The contract contained 128 cars (16 sets) for the Line 1 extension (Bao'an Highway station - Fujin Road station section). It also filled the capacity blank caused by AC04s removed from Line 1 fleet.

In 2014, AC06 was renamed to 01A05.

== Description ==
AC06 train is the first 8-car set rolling stock in Shanghai Metro. They have livery in black, red and white. Like DC01, AC01, AC02 and AC04, the interior seats are in green.

On 12 October 2004, Alstom awarded the contract. The delivery started from November 2006. The first AC06 train entered service on Line 1 on 31 January 2007.

== Mishap ==
On 22 December 2009, set 0150 collided with set 117 at just north of Shanghai Railway Station station. Set 0150 was in service and set 117 was out-of-service and moving to the siding for turning back. Car 013151 hit car 98033 and 98042, suffered damage. After the crash, car 013151 repaired and returned to service.
