= Pengpu Xincun station =

Shanghai Metro station

Pengpu Xincun 彭浦新村
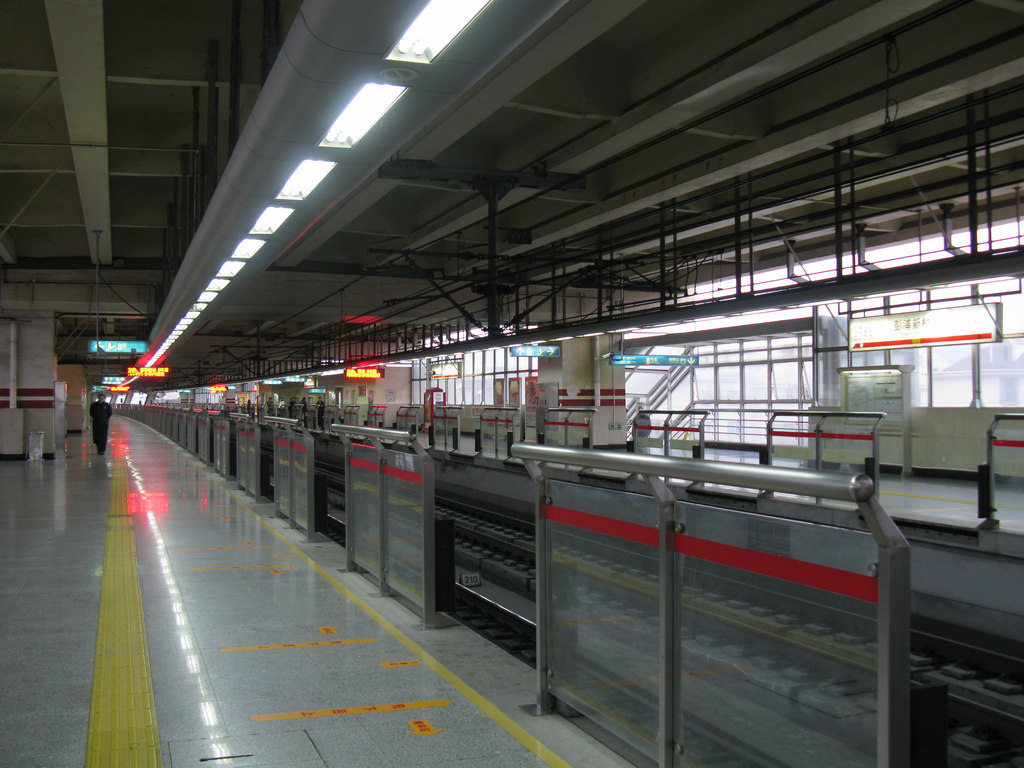
- Station platform

General information
- Location: Gonghexin Road and Changzhong Road (场中路); Jing'an District, Shanghai; China
- Coordinates: 31°18′24″N 121°26′56″E
- Operator: Shanghai No. 1 Metro Operation Co. Ltd.
- Line: Line 1
- Platforms: 2 (2 side platforms)
- Tracks: 2

Construction
- Structure type: Elevated
- Accessible: Yes

Other information
- Station code: L01/21

History
- Opened: 28 December 2004

Services
Preceding station	Shanghai Metro	Following station
Gongkang Road towards Fujin Road	Line 1	Wenshui Road towards Xinzhuang
Location
- Location within Shanghai

Pengpu Xincun (Chinese: 彭浦新村; pinyin: Péngpǔ Xīncūn) is a station on Shanghai Metro Line 1. The station is part of the northern extension of the line from Shanghai Railway Station to Gongfu Xincun that opened on 28 December 2004.
