= Tonghe Xincun station =

Shanghai Metro station

Tonghe Xincun 通河新村
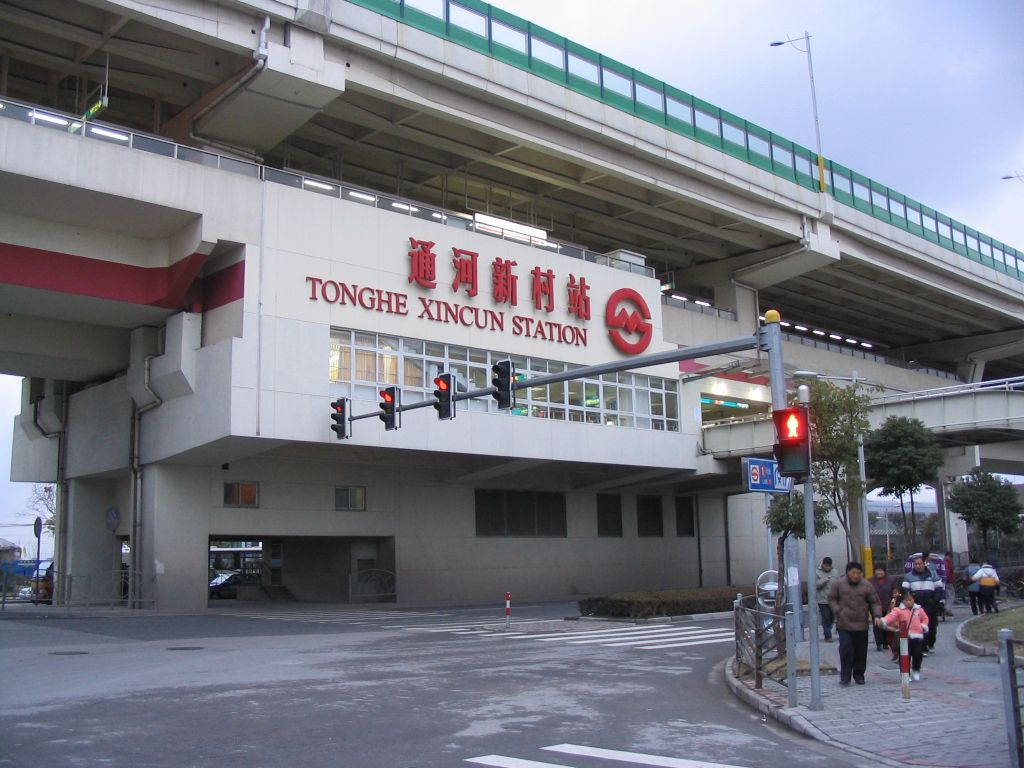
- Station exterior

General information
- Location: Gonghexin Road and West Changjiang Road (长江西路); Baoshan District, Shanghai; China
- Coordinates: 31°19′52″N 121°26′30″E
- Operator: Shanghai No. 1 Metro Operation Co. Ltd.
- Line: Line 1
- Platforms: 2 (2 side platforms)
- Tracks: 2

Construction
- Structure type: Elevated
- Accessible: Yes

Other information
- Station code: L01/23

History
- Opened: 28 December 2004

Services
Preceding station	Shanghai Metro	Following station
Hulan Road towards Fujin Road	Line 1	Gongkang Road towards Xinzhuang
Location
- Location within Shanghai

Tonghe Xincun (Chinese: 通河新村; pinyin: Tōnghé Xīncūn) is a station on Shanghai Metro Line 1. This station is part of the northern extension of that line from Shanghai Railway Station to Gongfu Xincun that opened on 28 December 2004.
