= Wenshui Road station =

Shanghai Metro station

Wenshui Road 汶水路
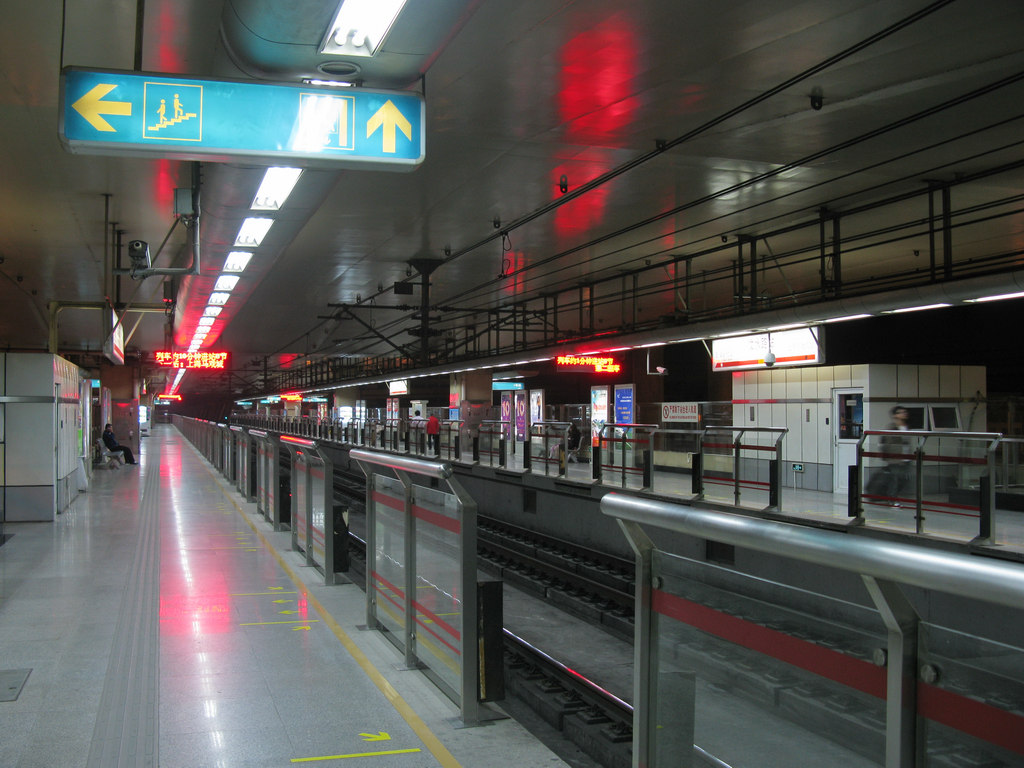
- Station platform

General information
- Location: Gonghexin Road and Wenshui Road (汶水路); Jing'an District, Shanghai; China
- Coordinates: 31°17′33″N 121°27′01″E
- Operator: Shanghai No. 1 Metro Operation Co. Ltd.
- Line: Line 1
- Platforms: 2 (2 side platforms)
- Tracks: 2

Construction
- Structure type: Elevated
- Accessible: Yes

Other information
- Station code: L01/20

History
- Opened: 28 December 2004

Services
Preceding station	Shanghai Metro	Following station
Pengpu Xincun towards Fujin Road	Line 1	Shanghai Circus World towards Xinzhuang
Location
- Location within Shanghai

Wenshui Road (Chinese: 汶水路; pinyin: Wènshuǐ Lù) is a station on Shanghai Metro Line 1. The station is part of the northern extension of the line from Shanghai Railway Station to Gongfu Xincun that opened on 28 December 2004.
