= Gongkang Road station =

Shanghai Metro station

Gongkang Road 共康路
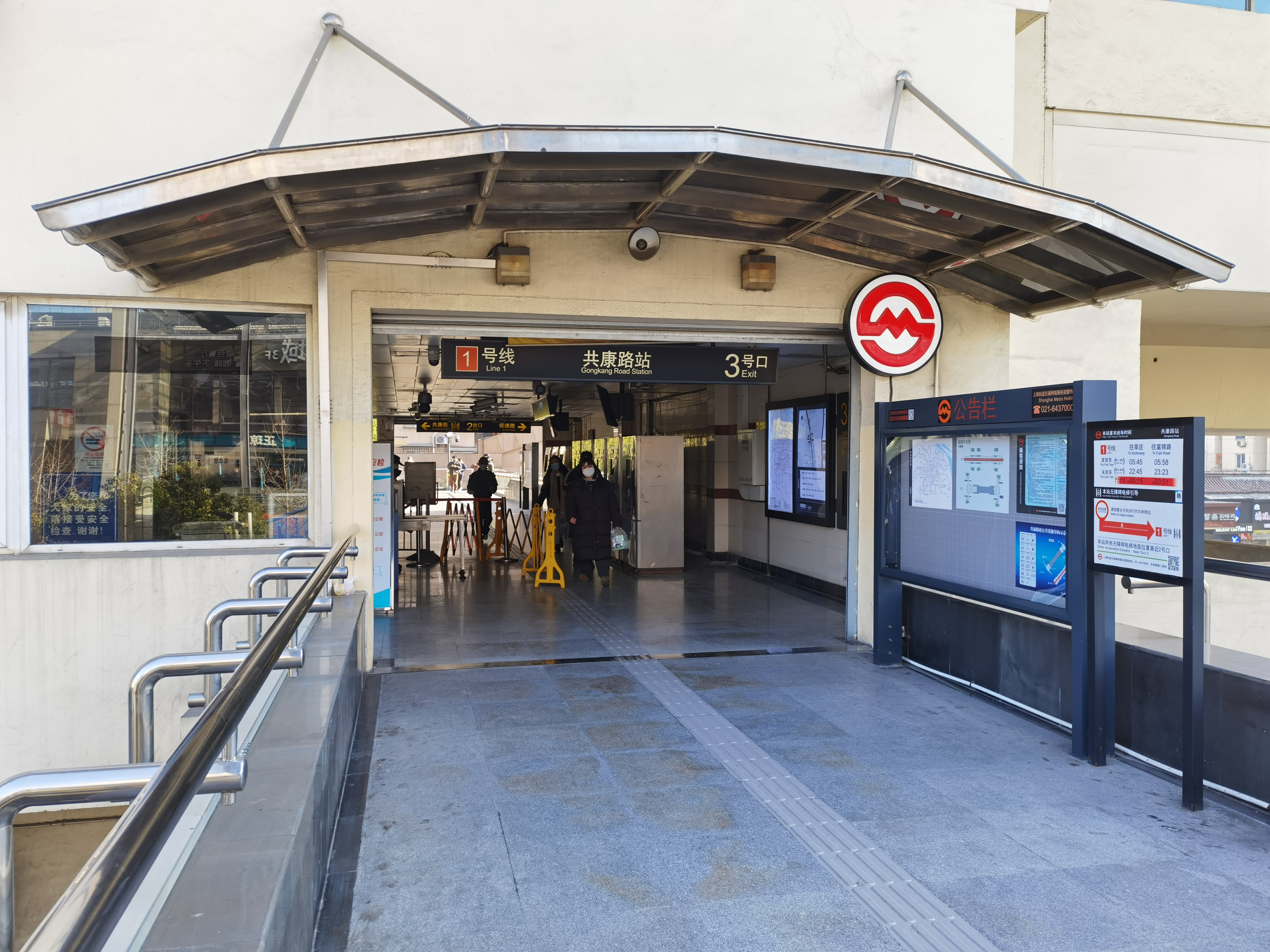

General information
- Location: Gonghexin Road and Baode Road (保德路); Jing'an District, Shanghai; China
- Coordinates: 31°19′08″N 121°26′49″E
- Operator: Shanghai No. 1 Metro Operation Co. Ltd.
- Line: Line 1
- Platforms: 2 (2 side platforms)
- Tracks: 2

Construction
- Structure type: Elevated
- Accessible: Yes

Other information
- Station code: L01/22

History
- Opened: 28 December 2004

Services
Preceding station	Shanghai Metro	Following station
Tonghe Xincun towards Fujin Road	Line 1	Pengpu Xincun towards Xinzhuang
Location
- Location within Shanghai

Gongkang Road (Chinese: 共康路; pinyin: Gòngkāng Lù) is a station on Shanghai Metro Line 1. This station is part of the northern extension of that line from Shanghai Railway Station to Gongfu Xincun that opened on 28 December 2004.
