= Yanchang Road station =

Shanghai Metro station

Yanchang Road 延长路
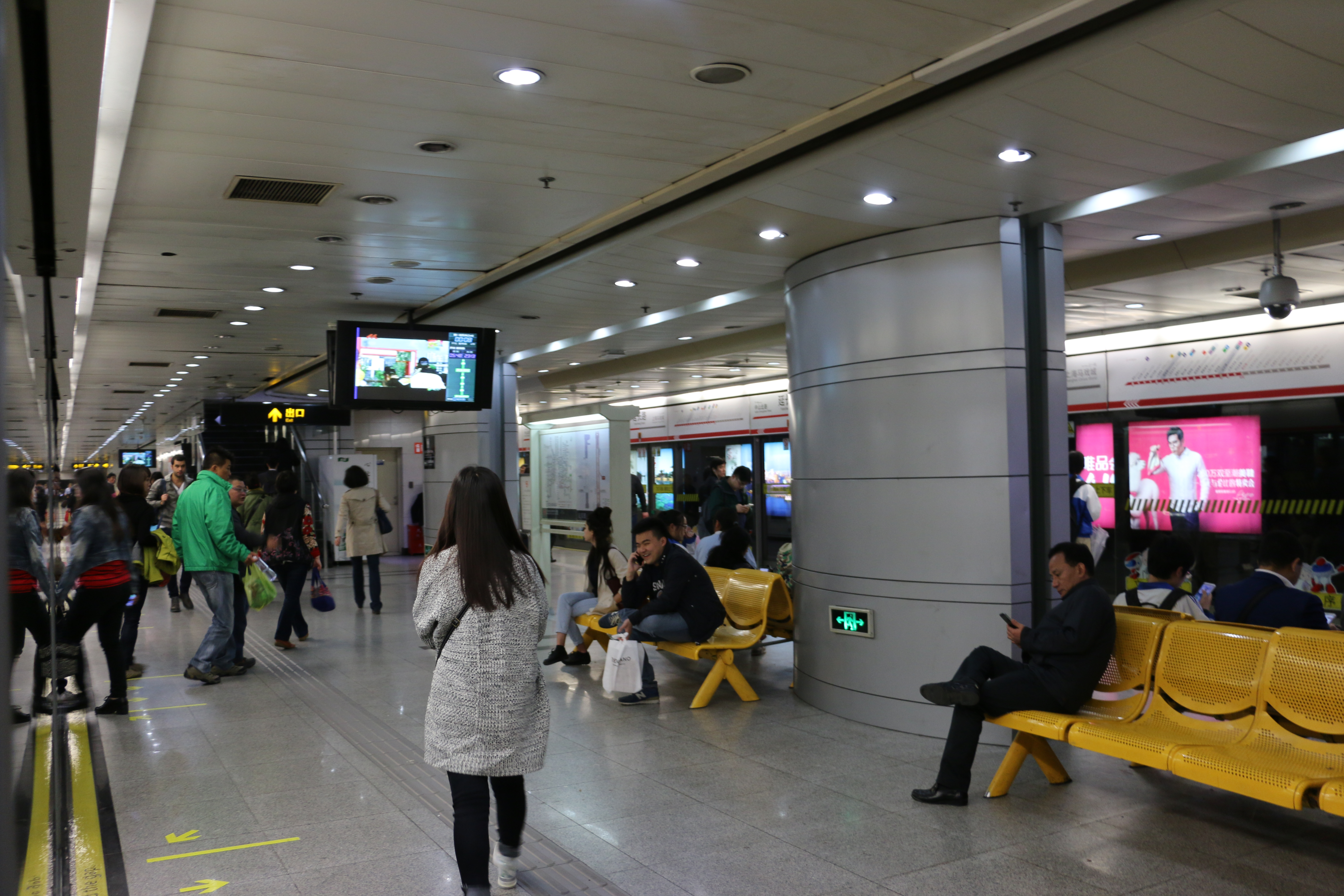
- Station platform

General information
- Location: Gonghexin Road and Middle Yanchang Road (延长中路); Jing'an District, Shanghai; China
- Coordinates: 31°16′18″N 121°27′19″E
- Operator: Shanghai No. 1 Metro Operation Co. Ltd.
- Line: Line 1
- Platforms: 2 (1 island platform)
- Tracks: 2

Construction
- Structure type: Underground
- Accessible: Yes

Other information
- Station code: L01/18

History
- Opened: 28 December 2004

Services
Preceding station	Shanghai Metro	Following station
Shanghai Circus World towards Fujin Road	Line 1	North Zhongshan Road towards Xinzhuang
Location
- Location within Shanghai

Yanchang Road (Chinese: 延长路; pinyin: Yáncháng Lù) is a station on Shanghai Metro Line 1. It is located in Jing'an District along Gonghexin Road (which is underneath the North–South Elevated Road), and is the first station outside the Inner Ring Road when travelling northbound from the central Huangpu District. This station is part of the northern extension of that line from Shanghai Railway Station to Gongfu Xincun that opened on 28 December 2004.

== Places nearby ==
- Shanghai University, Yanchang Campus
- Zhabei Park
