= West Youyi Road station =

Shanghai Metro station

West Youyi Road 友谊西路
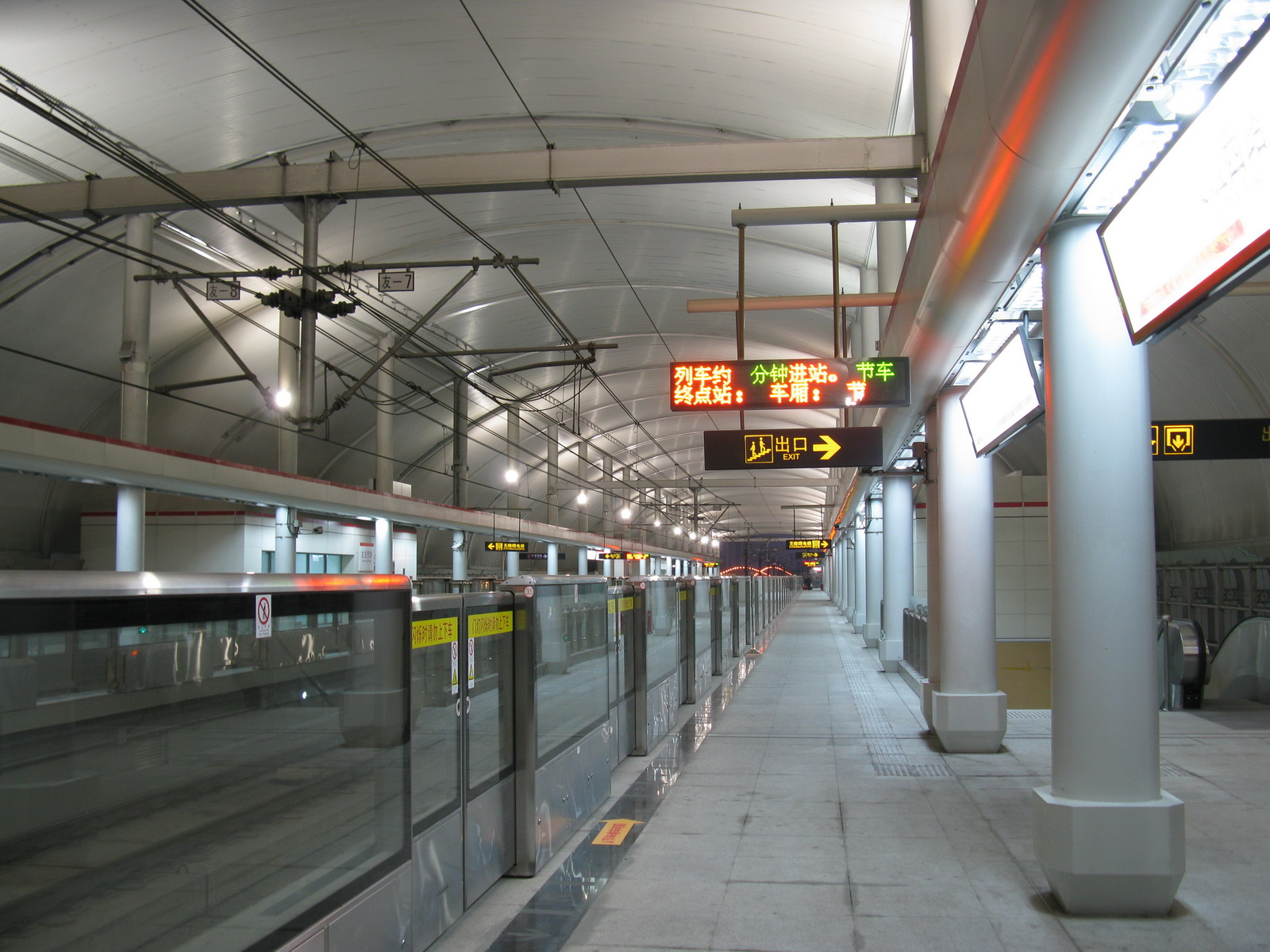
- Station platform

General information
- Location: Wenchuan Highway (蕰川路) and West Youyi Road; Baoshan District, Shanghai; China
- Coordinates: 31°22′53″N 121°25′41″E
- Operator: Shanghai No. 1 Metro Operation Co. Ltd.
- Line: Line 1
- Platforms: 2 (2 side platforms)
- Tracks: 2

Construction
- Structure type: Elevated
- Accessible: Yes

Other information
- Station code: L01/27

History
- Opened: 29 December 2007

Services
Preceding station	Shanghai Metro	Following station
Fujin Road Terminus	Line 1	Bao'an Highway towards Xinzhuang
Location
- Location within Shanghai

West Youyi Road (Chinese: 友谊西路; pinyin: Yǒuyì Xī Lù) is a station on Line 1 of the Shanghai Metro. This station is part of the northern extension of that line. This station is part of the northern extension of that line from Gongfu Xincun to Fujin Road that opened on 29 December 2007.
