= Hulan Road station =

Shanghai Metro station

Hulan Road 呼兰路
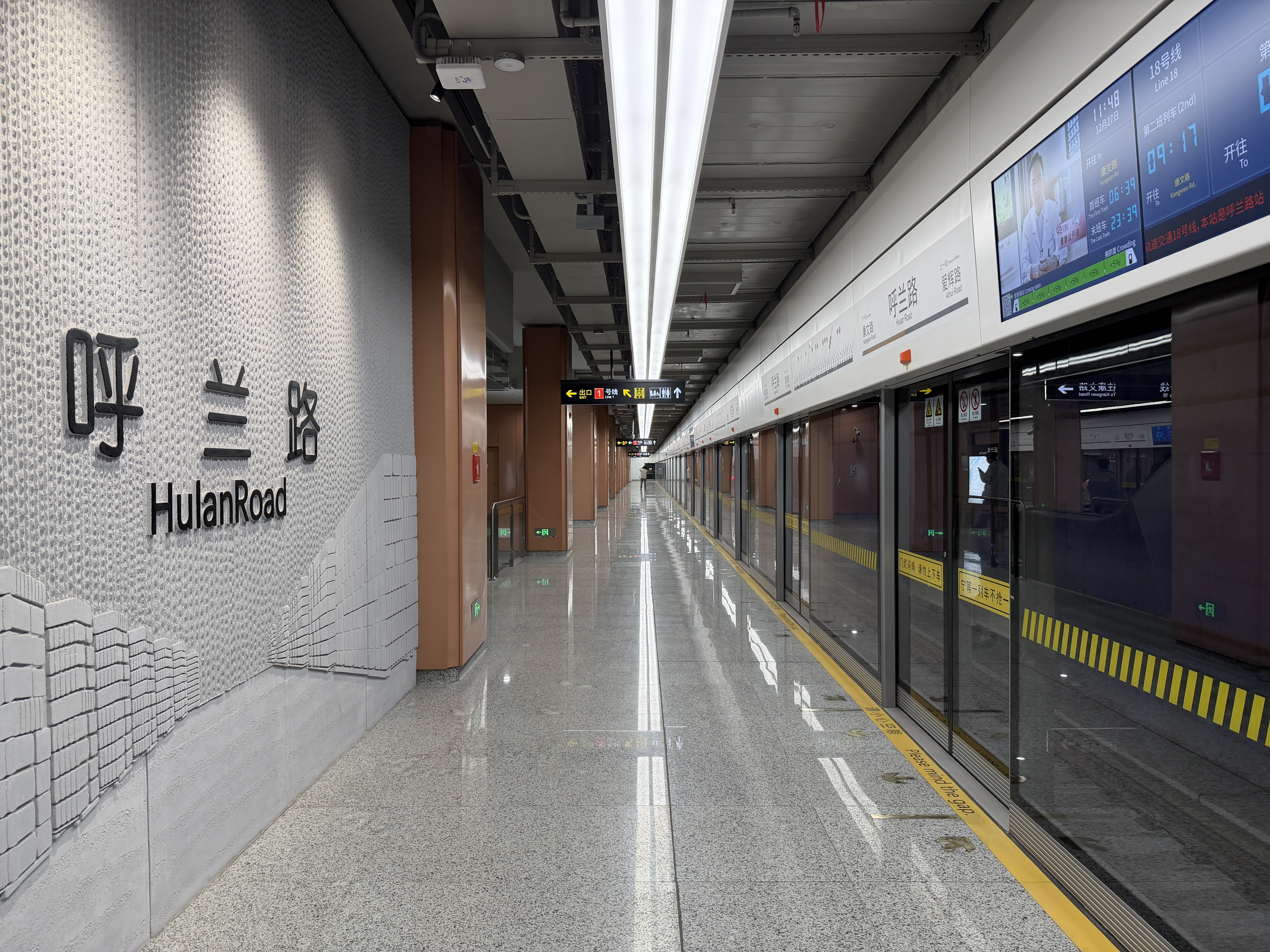
- Line 18 platform

General information
- Location: Gonghexin Road and Hulan Road (呼兰路); Baoshan District, Shanghai; China
- Coordinates: 31°20′23″N 121°26′16″E
- Operator: Shanghai No. 1 Metro Operation Co. Ltd.
- Lines: Line 1; Line 18
- Platforms: 4 (1 island platform and 2 side platforms)
- Tracks: 4

Construction
- Structure type: Elevated (Line 1); Underground (Line 18)
- Accessible: Yes

Other information
- Station code: L01/24

History
- Opened: Line 1: 28 December 2004 (21 years ago); Line 18: 27 December 2025 (7 months ago)

Services
Preceding station	Shanghai Metro	Following station
Gongfu Xincun towards Fujin Road	Line 1	Tonghe Xincun towards Xinzhuang
Kangwen Road Terminus	Line 18	Aihui Road towards Hangtou
Location
- Location within Shanghai

Hulan Road (Chinese: 呼兰路; pinyin: Hūlán Lù) is a station on Shanghai Metro located in the district of Baoshan in Shanghai, China. Initially opened in 2004, the station became an interchange station between Line 1 and Line 18 in 2025.

== History ==
The station was officially opened on 28 December 2004 as an elevated station, serving as the is part of the northern extension of Line 1 from Shanghai Railway Station to Gongfu Xincun that opened on 28 December 2004. It became an interchange station with the opening of Line 18's underground station, following the extension of that line on 27 December 2025.

== Structure ==
The station has two elevated side platforms for Line 1 and one underground island platform for Line 18. There are 8 entrance/exit gates.

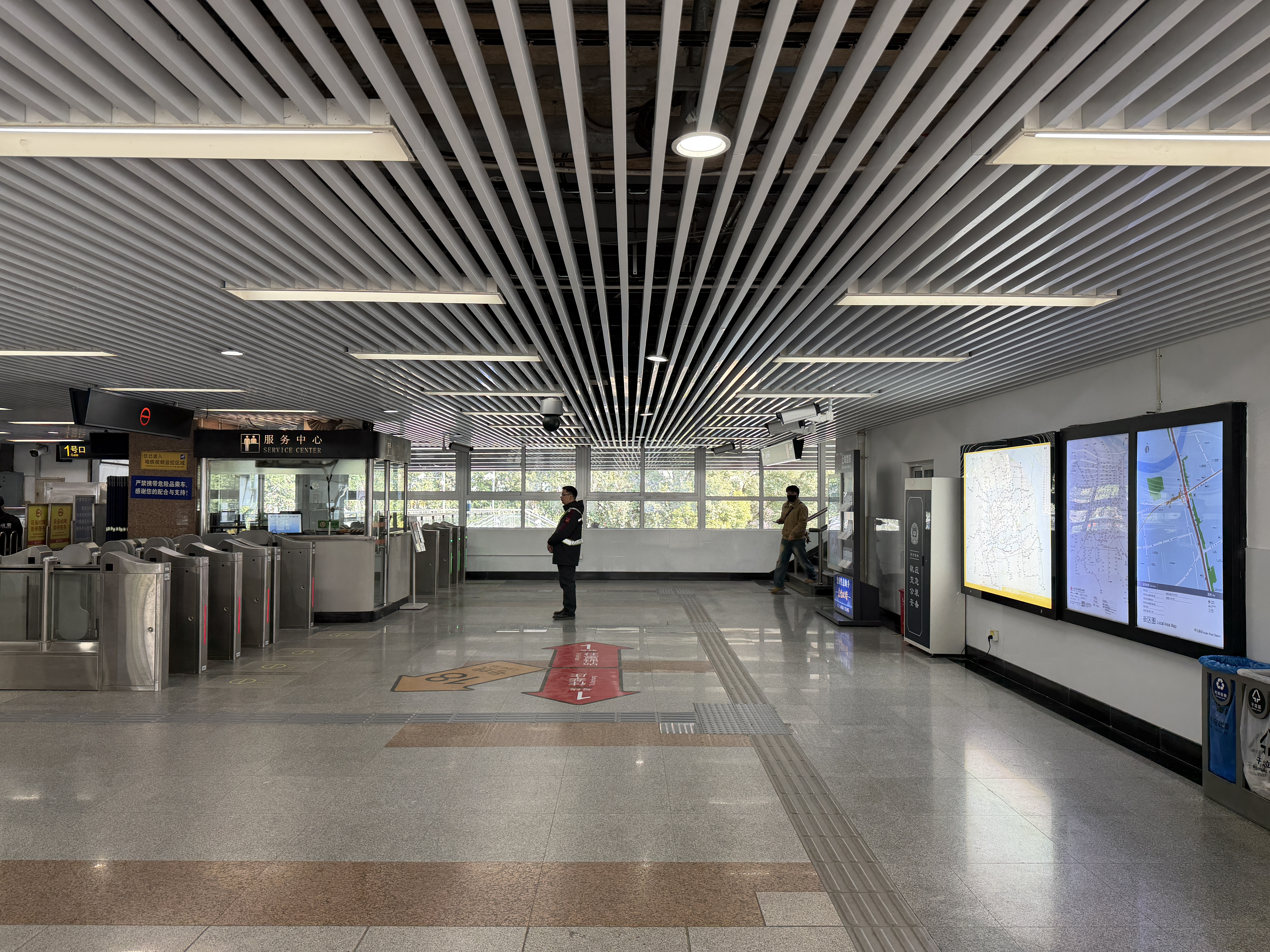
Line 1 North Concourse

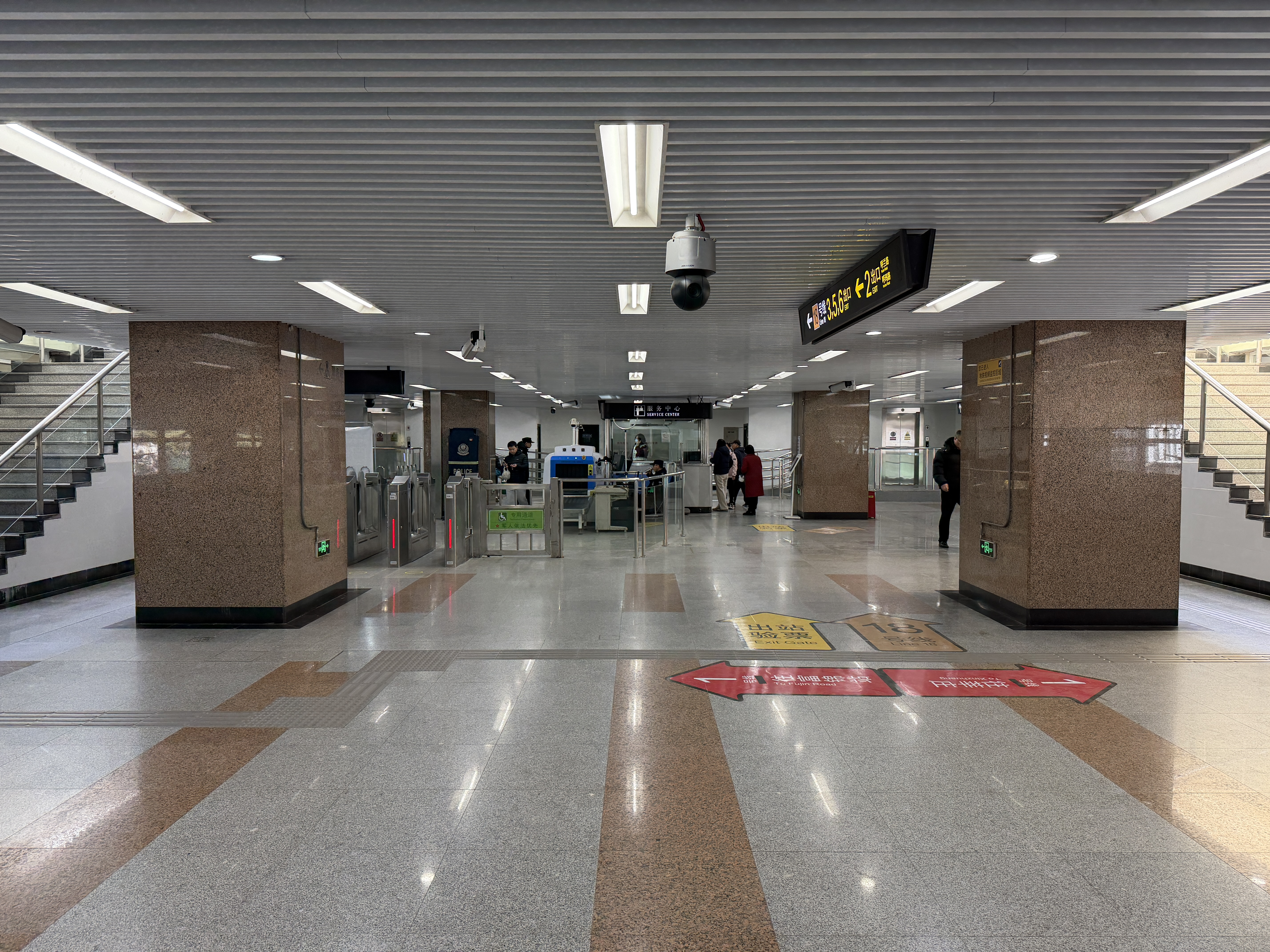
Line 1 South Concourse

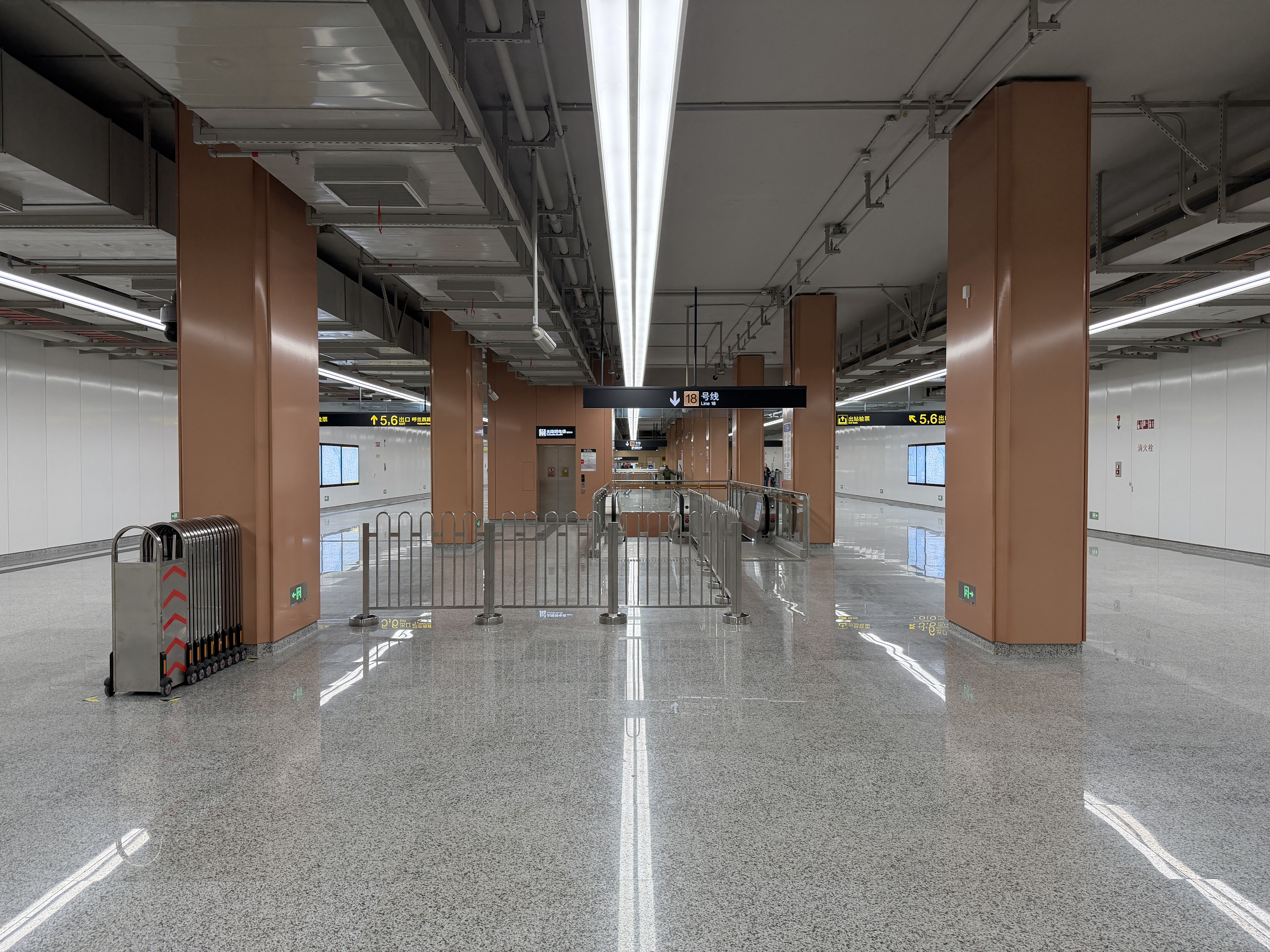
Line 18 Concourse

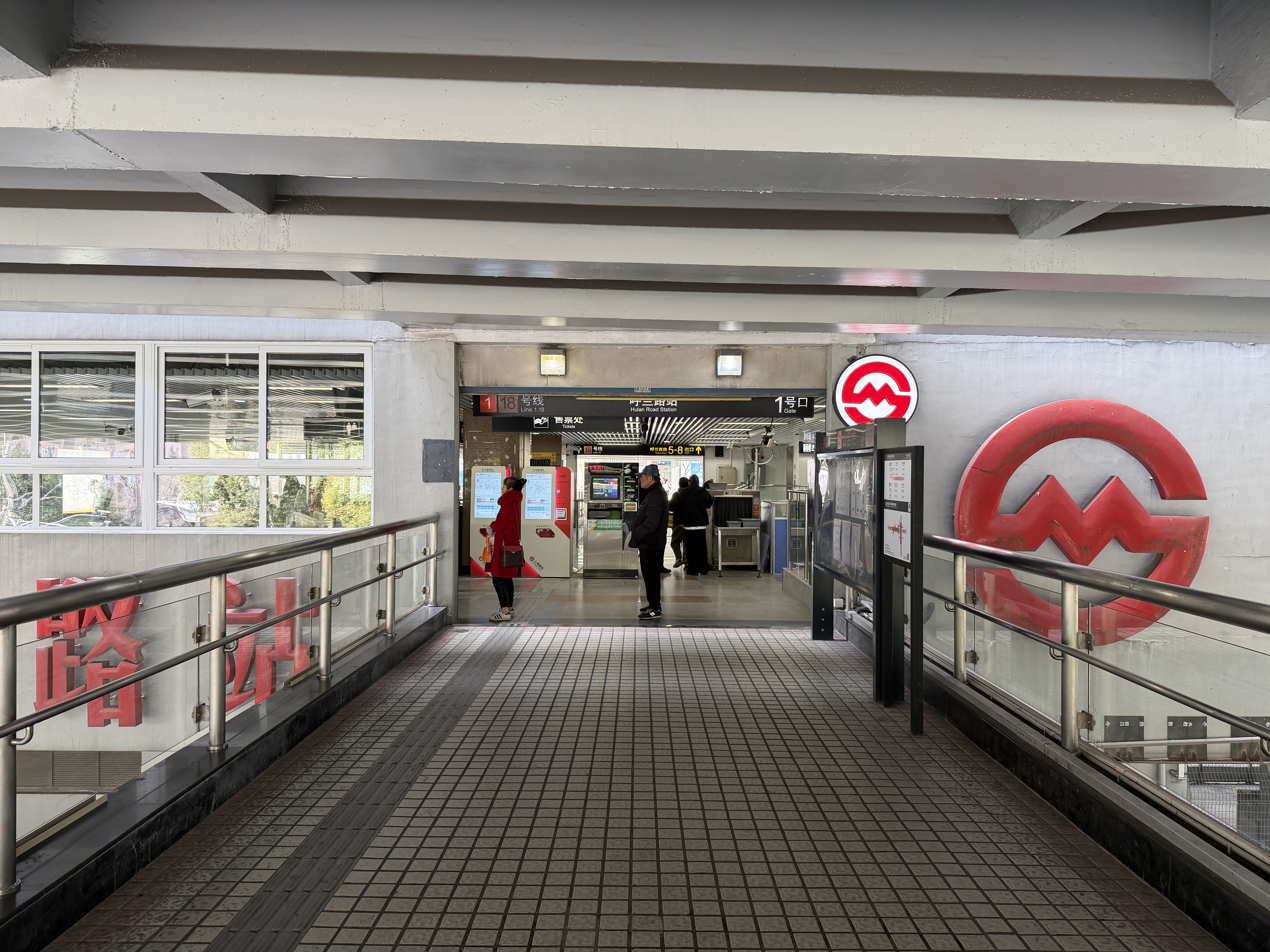
Gate 1

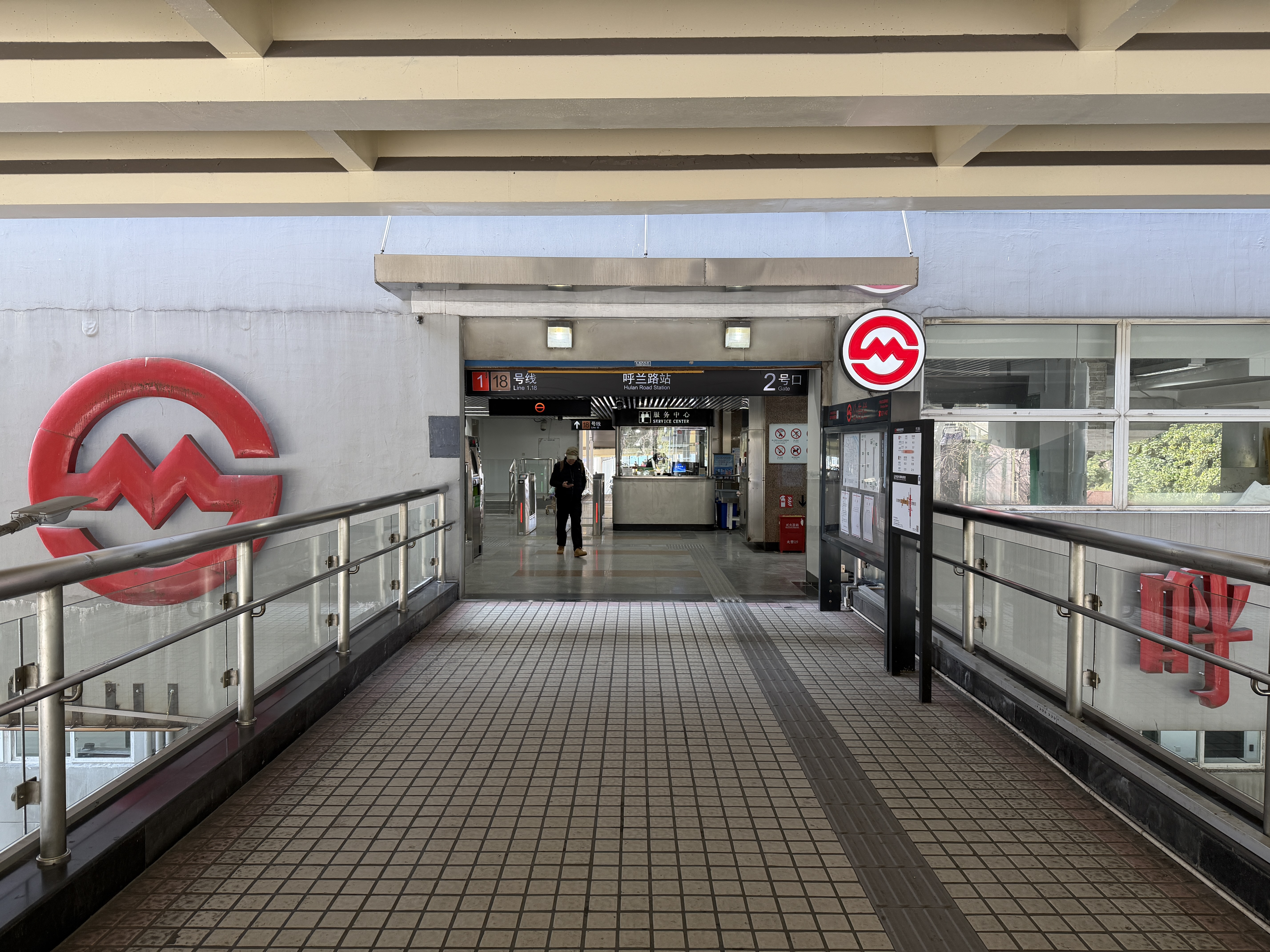
Gate 2

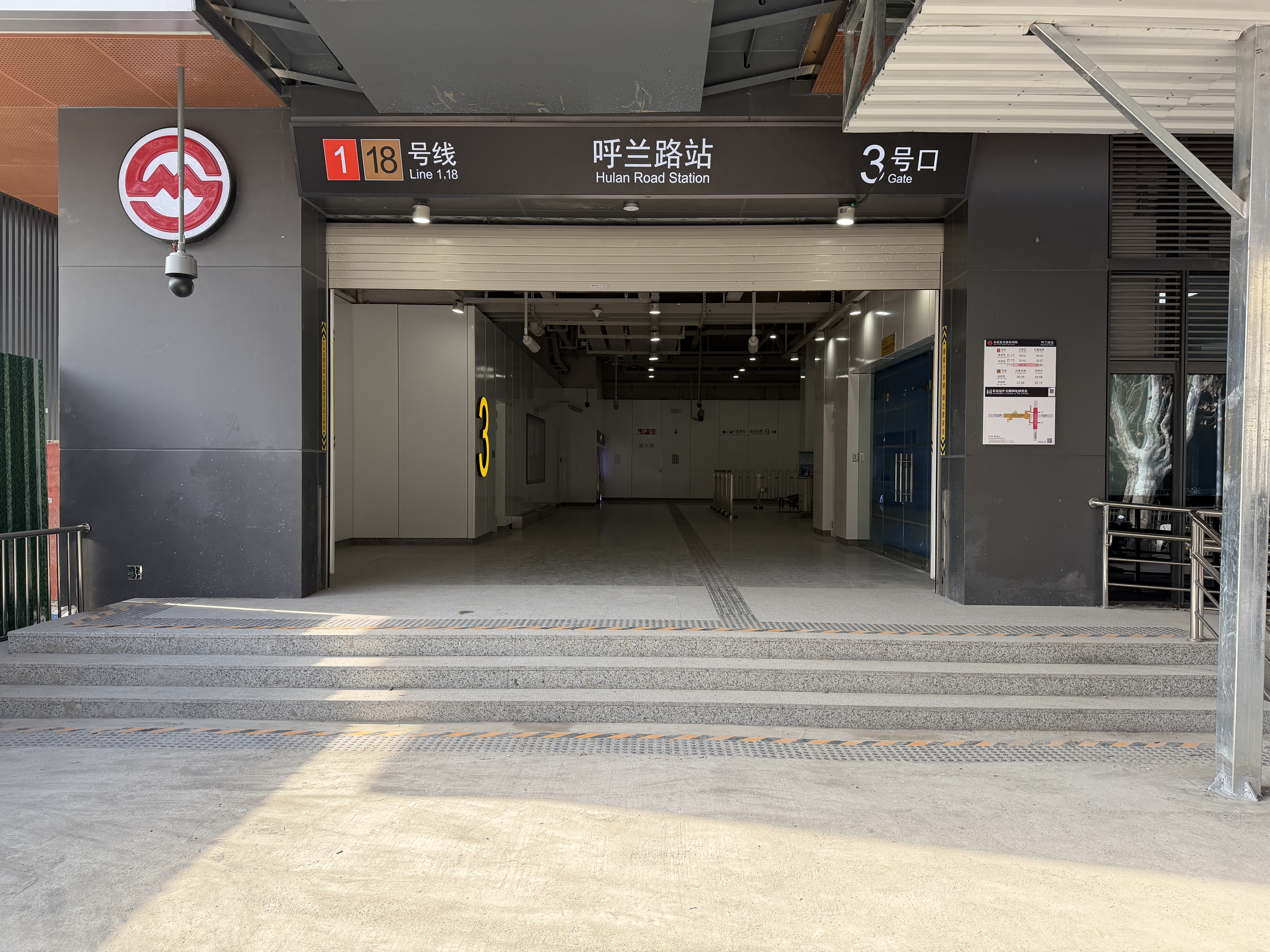
Gate 3

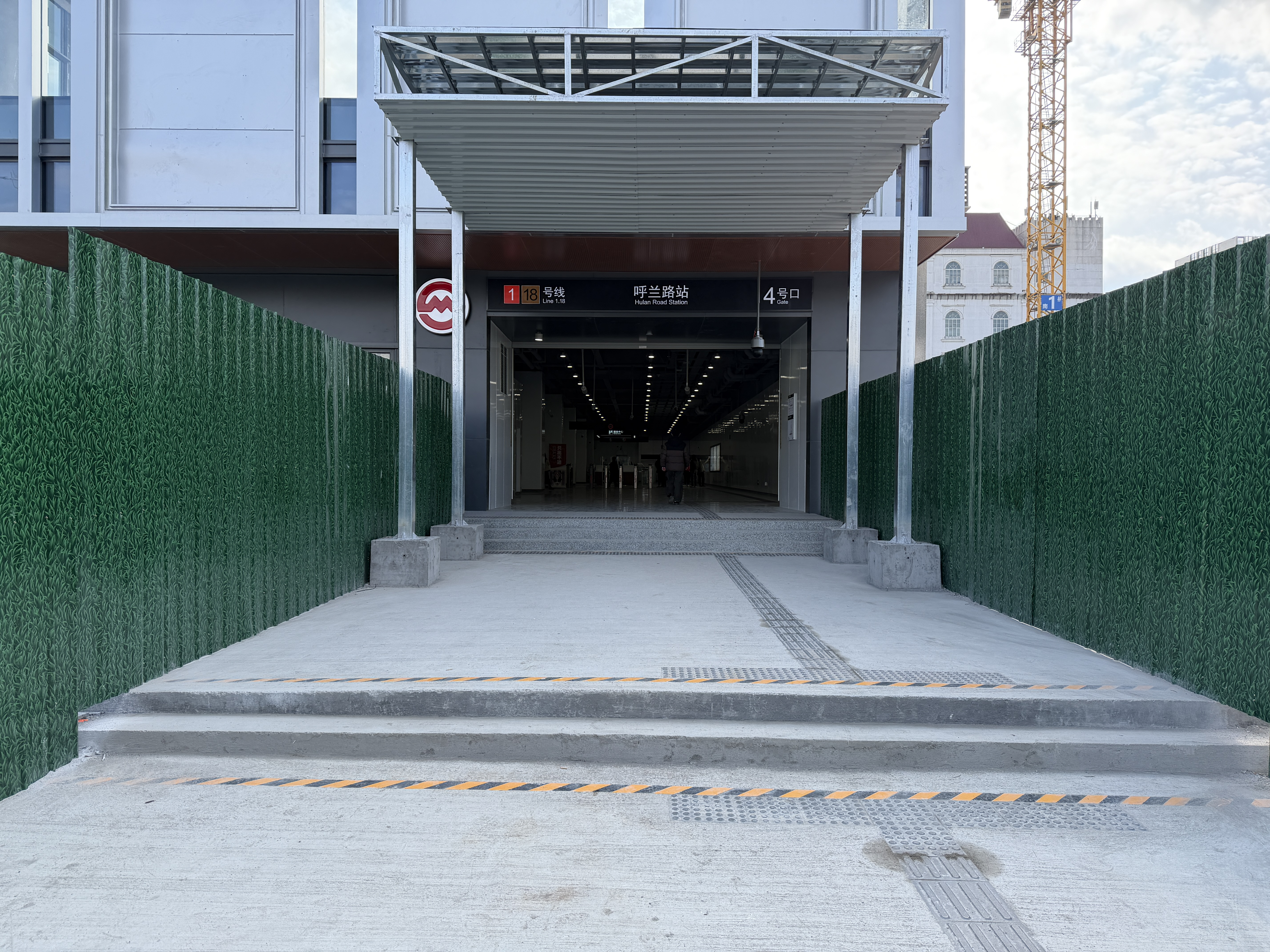
Gate 4

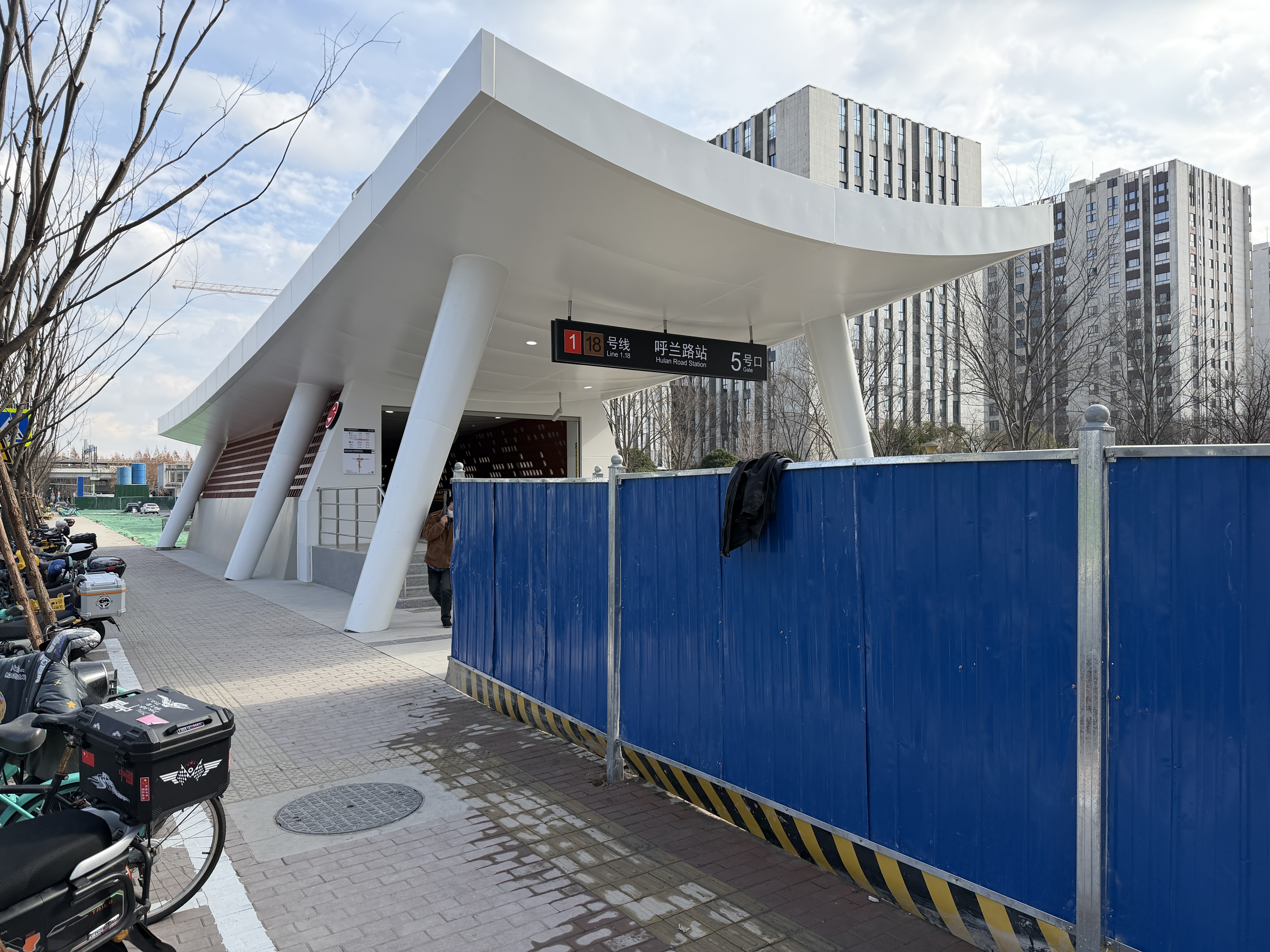
Gate 5

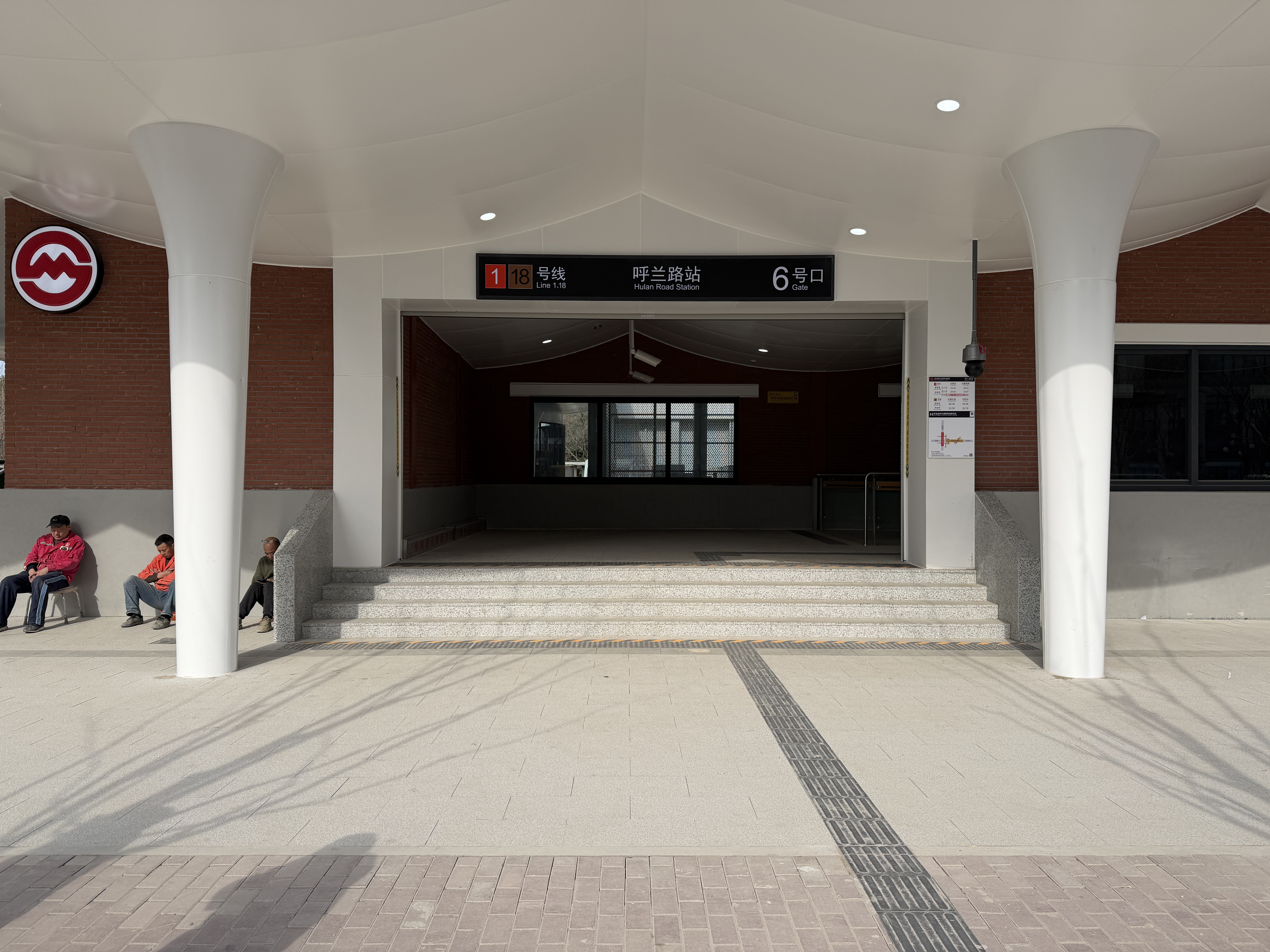
Gate 6

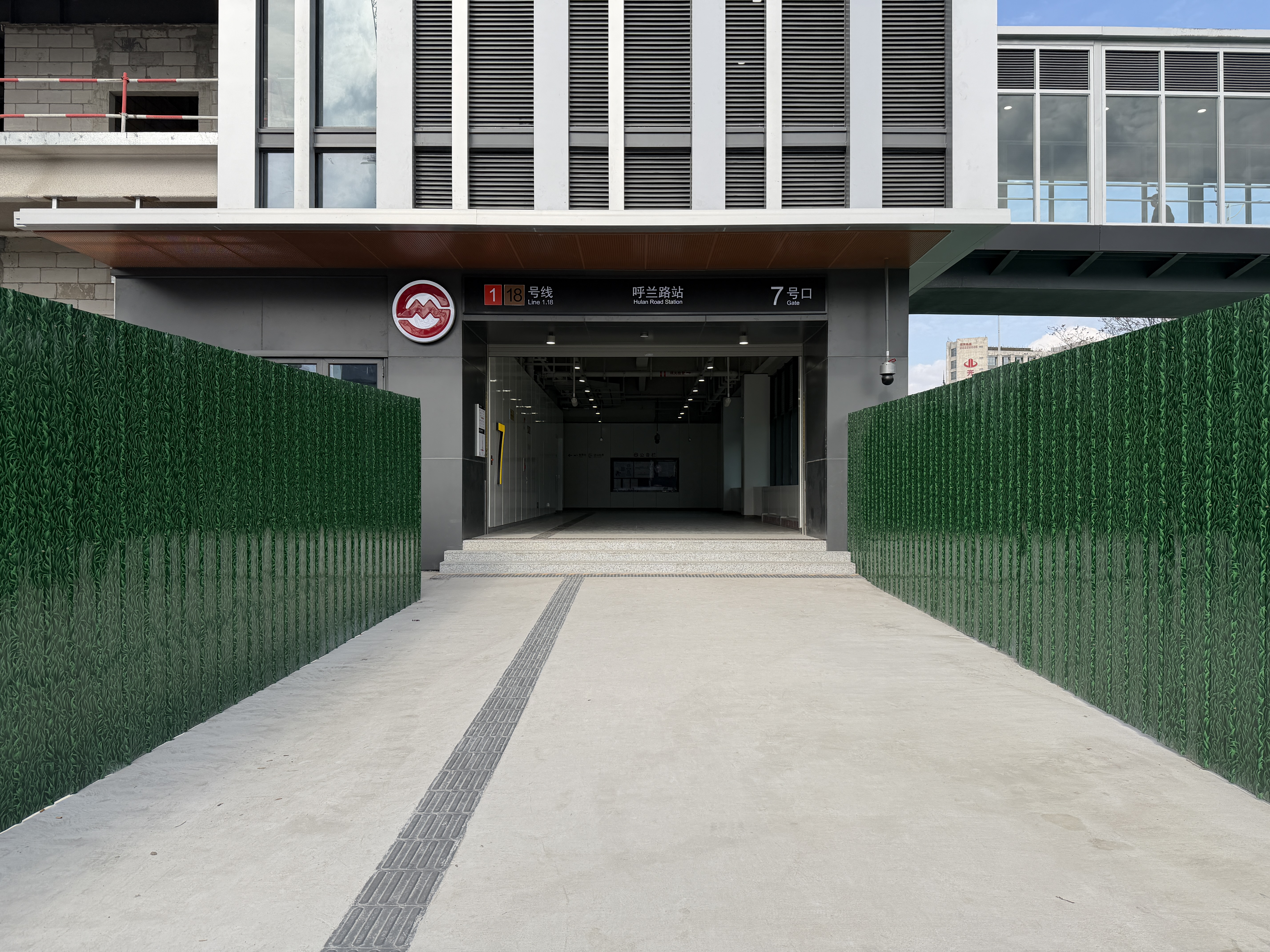
Gate 7

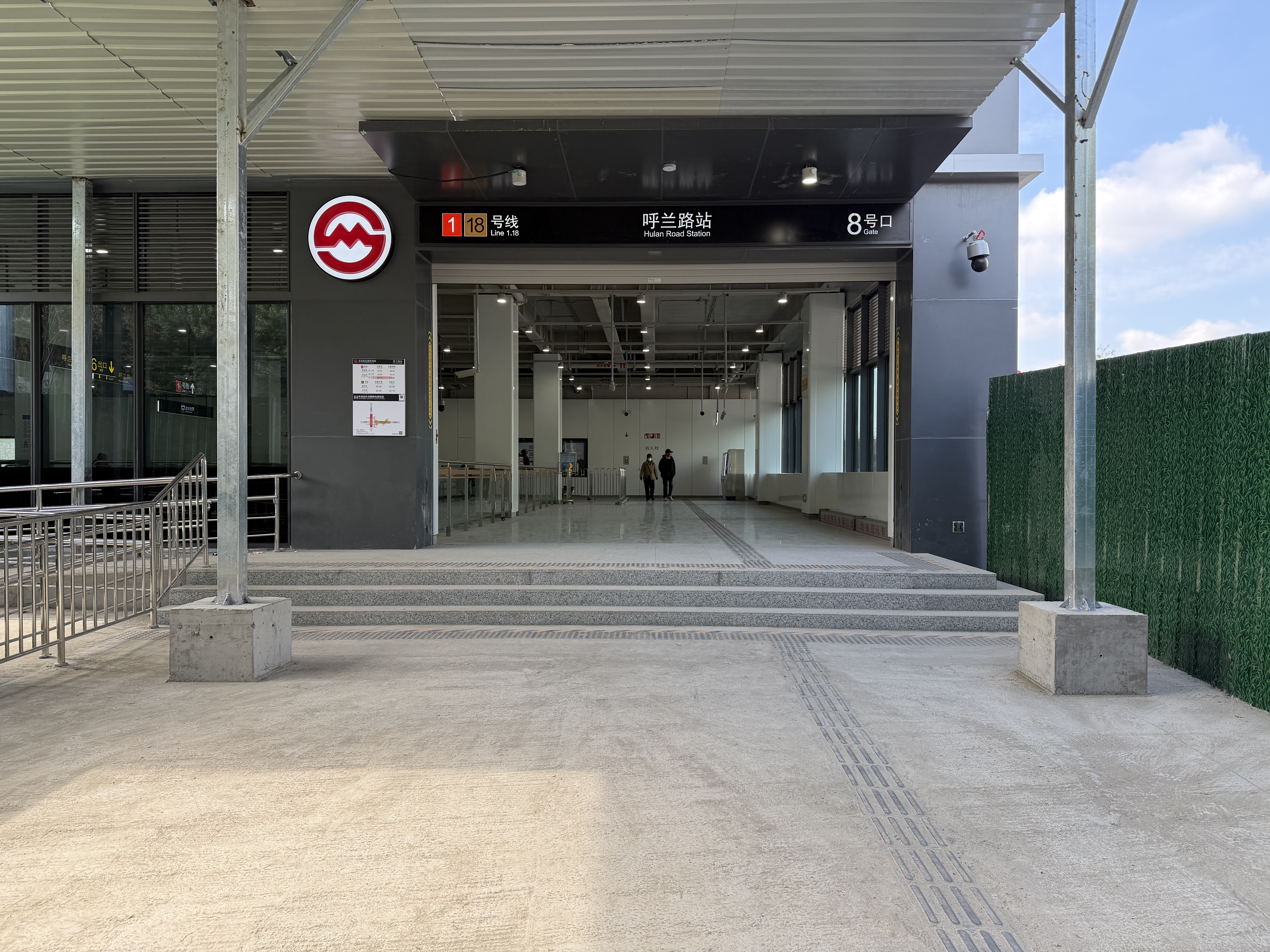
Gate 8
