= Shanghai Circus World =

Indoor circus in Shanghai, China

- 上海马戏城
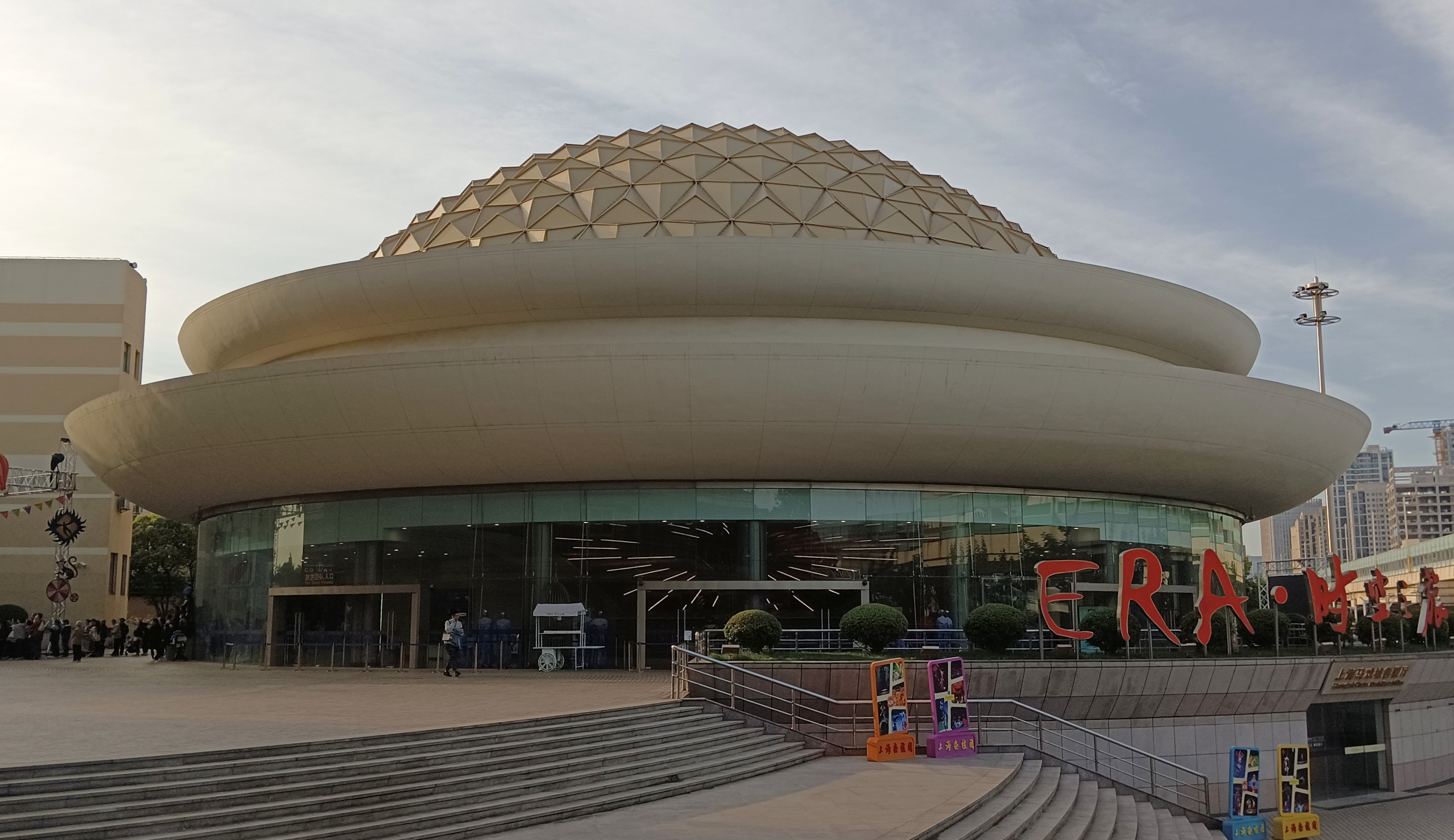

General information
- Location: Shanghai, 2266 Gonghe New Road (上海市静安区共和新路2266号)
- Coordinates: 31°16′48″N 121°26′49″E
- Opened: 1999

Website
- www.shanghaimaxicheng.com

Shanghai Circus World (simplified Chinese: 上海马戏城; traditional Chinese: 上海馬戲城; pinyin: Shànghǎi Mǎxì Chéng) is a large, permanent indoor circus in the city of Shanghai, China.

Shanghai Circus World covers an area of 22,500 square meters. Its main facility is the circular Acrobatics Field, surrounded by 1,638 seats.

The acrobatic show 'ERA: Intersection of Time' debuted at Shanghai Circus World in September of 2005 and ran through January of 2020, when it went on hiatus for reimagining.

It reopened as 'ERA 2: Spirit of Shanghai' in July of 2021 and is still being performed with a usual run time of 60 minutes, though some weekend shows last 100 minutes with one 15-minute intermission.

The show features traditional Chinese arts and culture performed since the Han Dynasty (206BC–220AD) and combines them with modern technologies. The performers present acrobatics, martial arts and dance in harmony with costumes, music, sound, lighting and other special effects.

The original show told the story of China's evolution from its ancient civilization to the future, with sections that included a water screen, juggling porcelain jars and vats, and Sinan, an ancient Chinese invention for telling directions, soothsaying and conjuring. Modern elements showcased Shanghai's Donghai Cross-Sea Bridge, its Maglev Train, and Shenzhou 5, China's first crewed space mission.

The current show is framed by a romantic story, but it is essentially a series of circus acts with synchronized dance interludes. Gymnastic stunts performed on stage alternate with aerial and trapeze work, all requiring exceptional strength and balance. There is a train from China's high-speed rail network, a bicycle act that moves into the audience, and a segment featuring up to eight motorcycle riders spinning around inside a spherical steel cage.

== Transportation ==
Shanghai Circus World is served by the Shanghai Circus World station on Shanghai Metro Line 1.
