= Bao'an Highway station =

Shanghai Metro station

Bao'an Highway 宝安公路
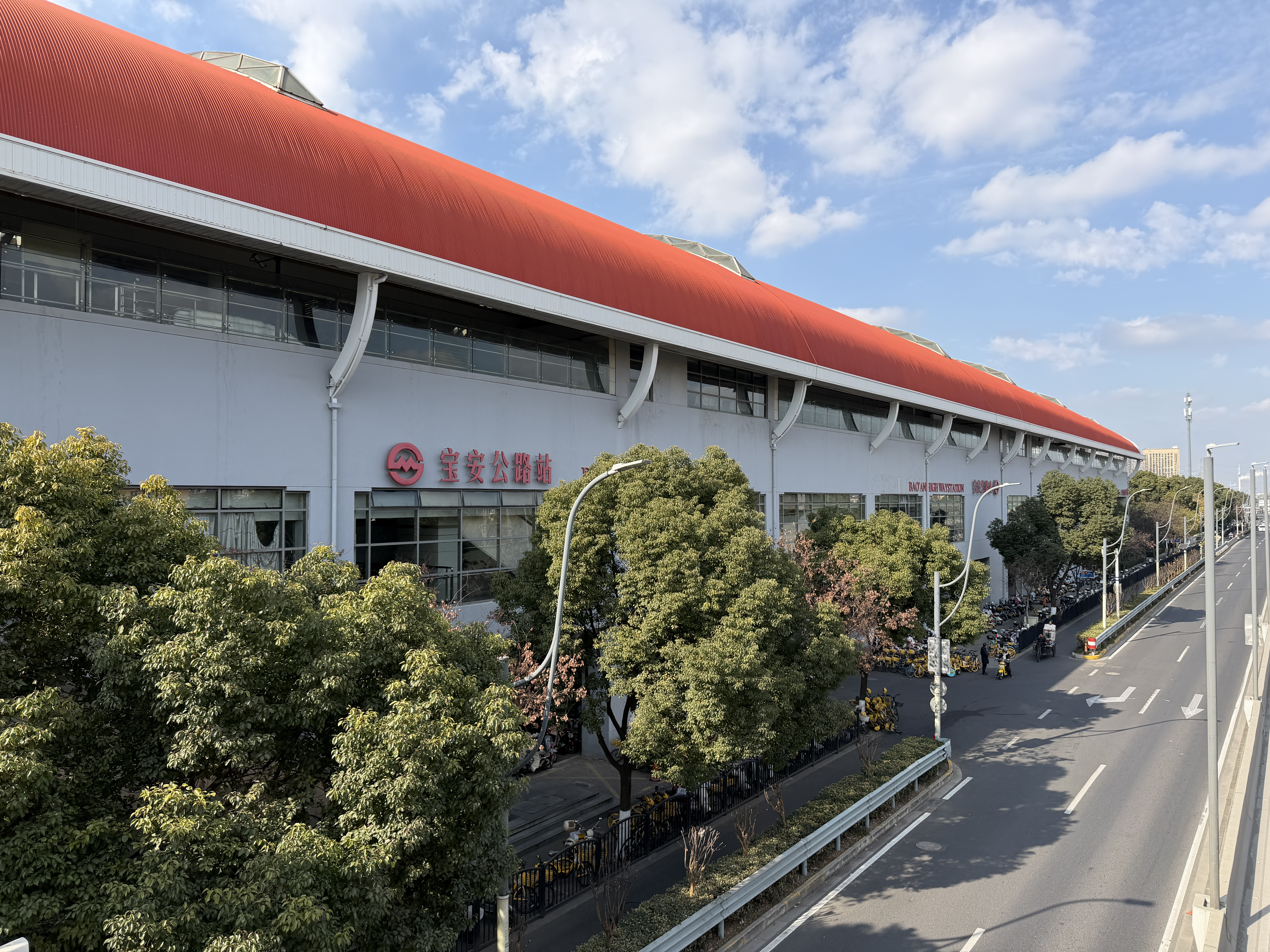
- Station Building

General information
- Location: Wenchuan Highway (蕰川路) south of Bao'an Highway (宝安公路); Yanghang, Baoshan District, Shanghai; China
- Coordinates: 31°22′10″N 121°25′51″E
- Operator: Shanghai No. 1 Metro Operation Co. Ltd.
- Line: Line 1
- Platforms: 2 (2 side platforms)
- Tracks: 2

Construction
- Structure type: Elevated
- Accessible: Yes

Other information
- Station code: L01/26

History
- Opened: 29 December 2007

Services
Preceding station	Shanghai Metro	Following station
West Youyi Road towards Fujin Road	Line 1	Gongfu Xincun towards Xinzhuang
Location
- Location within Shanghai

Bao'an Highway (Chinese: 宝安公路; pinyin: Bǎo'ān Gōnglù) is a station on Shanghai Metro Line 1. This station is part of the northern extension of that line from Gongfu Xincun to Fujin Road that opened on 29 December 2007.
