= Line 1 (Shanghai Metro) =

Metro line of the Shanghai Metro

Coordinates: 31.2692°N 121.4570°E

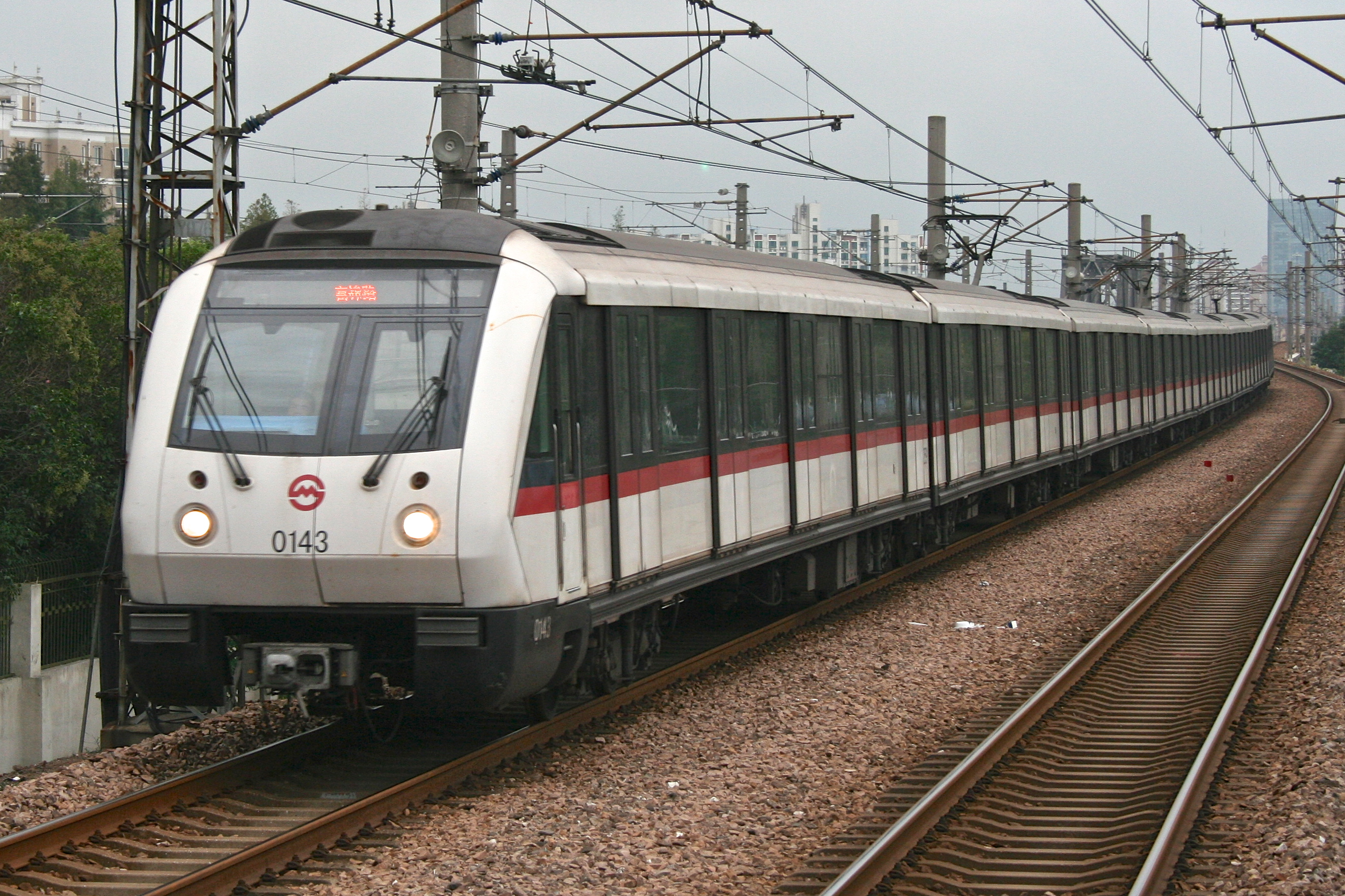
- AC06 trainset in November 2013

Overview
- Other name: R1 (planned name)
- Native name: 上海地铁1号线
- Status: Operational; Extension to Chongming Island previously planned
- Owner: Shentong Metro Line 1 Development Co., Ltd. (south of Shanghai Circus World); Shanghai Gonghexin Road Elevated Development Co., Ltd. (north of Shanghai Circus World)
- Locale: Minhang, Xuhui, Huangpu, Jing'an, and Baoshan districts, Shanghai, China
- Termini: Fujin Road; Xinzhuang
- Stations: 28
- Colour on map: Red (#e3002b)

Service
- Type: Rapid transit
- System: Shanghai Metro
- Operator: Shanghai No. 1 Metro Operation Co. Ltd.
- Depot(s): Fujin Road Yard; Meilong Depot
- Rolling stock: 01A02; 01A03; 01A04; 01A05; 01A06; 01A07
- Daily ridership: 1.507 million (2019 peak)

History
- Work began: January 19, 1990; 36 years ago
- Opened: May 28, 1993; 33 years ago
- Last extension: December 29, 2007; 18 years ago

Technical
- Line length: 36.39 km (22.61 mi)
- Number of tracks: 2
- Character: Underground: Shanghai South Railway Station ↔ Wenshui Road; At grade: Xinzhuang ↔ Jinjiang Park; Elevated Wenshui Road ↔ Fujin Road
- Track gauge: 1,435 mm (4 ft 8 1/2 in) standard gauge
- Electrification: Overhead lines (1500 volts)
- Operating speed: 80 km/h (50 mph); Average speed: 33.9 km/h (21 mph)
- Signalling: CASCO
Route map
Route on the Shanghai map:
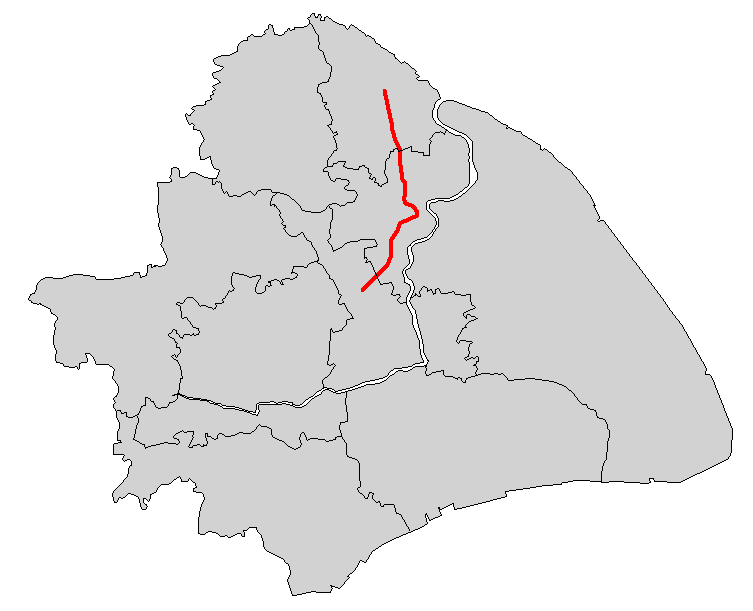
To scale geographic map:

Line 1 (Chinese: 上海地铁1号线) is a north–south line of the Shanghai Metro. It runs from Fujin Road in the north, via Shanghai Railway Station to Xinzhuang in the south. The first line to open in the Shanghai Metro system, line 1 serves many important points in Shanghai, including People's Square and Xujiahui. Due to the large number of important locations served, this line is extremely busy, with a daily ridership of over 1,000,000 passengers. Generally, the line runs at grade beside the Shanghai–Hangzhou railway in the south, underground in the city center and elevated on the second deck of the North–South Elevated Road in the North. The line is colored red on system maps.

== History ==
The required investment for the project was US$620 million (including domestic supporting RMB investment). In August 1988 and May 1989, the program of loans to the Federal Republic of Germany, France and the United States was approved by the State Planning Commission.

- The Federal Government of Germany has a loan of 460 million marks, an annual interest rate of 0.75%, a committed rate of 0.25%, a repayment period of 30 years, and a grace period of 10 years.
- French mixed loan of 132 million francs, of which 54% of government soft loans, annual interest rate of 2%, loan repayment period of 19 years, grace period of 11 years; export credit 46%, annual interest rate of 8.3%, loan repayment period of 10 years, grace period of 22 month.
- The US loaned US$23.18 million, of which 45% were government grants and 55% were commercial loans. The annual interest rate fluctuates, the loan repayment period is 10 years, and the grace period is 5 years.

With the start of construction of the project, the cost has also increased. In August 1993, the budgetary estimate was adjusted to 3.974 billion yuan, of which domestic supporting funds increased by 1.086 billion yuan. In January 1995, the total budget was adjusted for the second time to 5.39 billion yuan, of which 3.961 billion yuan was domestic supporting funds.

- May 28, 1993 – The first 4.4 km (2.7 mi) long section of the line, from Xujiahui to Shanghai South Railway Station (formerly known as Xinlonghua), opens.
- April 10, 1995 – The entire 16.1 km (10.0 mi) long original line, from Shanghai Railway Station to Jinjiang Park, opens.
- December 28, 1996 – Separate southern section from Jinjiang Park (formerly known as Hongmei Road South) to Xinzhuang opens. Northern extension continues to operate to Shanghai Railway Station.
- July 1, 1997 – The northern and southern sections are connected, forming one complete line from Shanghai Railway Station – Xinzhuang.
- December 28, 2004 – Line runs from Gongfu Xincun – Xinzhuang after northern extension opens.
- December 29, 2007 – Second northern extension opens; full line runs from Fujin Road – Xinzhuang.

Shanghai Metro Line 1 opening history
Segment	Commencement	Opened	Length	Station(s)	Name	Investment
Jinjiang Park — Xujiahui	19 Jan 1990	28 May 1993	4.4 km (2.73 mi)	4	Initial phase (1st section)	¥5.39 billion
Xujiahui — Shanghai Railway Station	19 Jan 1990	10 Apr 1995	11.7 km (7.27 mi)	8	Initial phase (2nd section)	¥5.39 billion
Xinzhuang — Jinjiang Park	10 Dec 1994	28 Dec 1996	5.3 km (3.29 mi)	4	Southern extension	¥620 million
Shanghai Railway Station — Gongfu Xincun		28 Dec 2004	12.4 km (7.71 mi)	9	1st Northern extension	¥4.62 billion
Gongfu Xincun — Fujin Road		29 Dec 2007	4.3 km (2.67 mi)	3	2nd Northern extension	¥1.5339 billion

== Stations ==
=== Service routes ===
Shanghai Metro Line 1 service routes
M - Mainline: Xinzhuang ↔ Fujin Road; P - Partial Mainline: Xinzhuang ↔ Shanghai Railway Station (operates during working days off-peak hours)
Routes		Station name		Connections	Distance			Location	Open- ing	Plat- form
M	P	English	Chinese	Connections	km		min	Location	Open- ing	Plat- form
●	●	Xinzhuang	莘庄	5 Jinshan (Note: Xinzhuang station on the Jinshan line is currently under reconstruction. Expected reopening: 2024.) XZH	0.00	0.00	0	Minhang	28 Dec 1996	At-grade; Side
●	●	Waihuanlu	外环路		1.31	1.31	3	Minhang	28 Dec 1996	At-grade; Side
●	●	Lianhua Road	莲花路		1.46	2.77	5	Minhang	28 Dec 1996 (Note: Former station opened on 28 December 1996; Renovated station opened on 25 June 2021.)	At-grade; Side
●	●	Jinjiang Park	锦江乐园		1.63	4.40	8	Xuhui	10 April 1995	At-grade; Side
●	●	Shanghai South Railway Station	上海南站	3 15 Jinshan SNH	2.09	6.49	11	Xuhui	28 May 1993 (Note: Former station opened on 28 May 1993; current station opened on 30 October 2004.)	Underground; Island
●	●	Caobao Road	漕宝路	12	1.60	8.09	14	Xuhui	28 May 1993	Underground; Island
●	●	Shanghai Indoor Stadium	上海体育馆	4	1.57	9.66	16	Xuhui	28 May 1993	Underground; Island
●	●	Xujiahui	徐家汇	9 11	1.20	10.86	18	Xuhui	28 May 1993	Underground; Island
●	●	Hengshan Road	衡山路		1.58	12.44	21	Xuhui	10 April 1995	Underground; Island
●	●	Changshu Road	常熟路	7	1.09	13.53	23	Xuhui	10 April 1995	Underground; Island
●	●	South Shaanxi Road	陕西南路	10 12	0.93	14.46	24	Huangpu	10 April 1995	Underground; Island
●	●	Site of the First CPC National Congress · South Huangpi Road	一大会址·黄陂南路	14	1.32	15.78	26	Huangpu	10 April 1995	Underground; Island
●	●	People's Square	人民广场	2 8	1.57	17.35	29	Huangpu	10 April 1995	Underground; Island
●	●	Xinzha Road	新闸路		0.95	18.30	31	Huangpu	10 April 1995	Underground; Island
●	●	Hanzhong Road	汉中路	12 13	0.99	19.29	33	Jing'an	10 April 1995	Underground; Island
●	●	Shanghai Railway Station	上海火车站	3 4 (Note: Virtual transfer with lines 3 and 4 – passengers who hold the Shanghai Public Transportation Card and transfer within 30 minutes of exiting the station are able to transfer to other lines without exiting the system.) SHH	0.82	20.11	35	Jing'an	10 April 1995	Underground; Island
●		North Zhongshan Road	中山北路		1.37	21.48	38	Jing'an	28 Dec 2004	Underground; Island
●		Yanchang Road	延长路		1.52	23.00	40	Jing'an	28 Dec 2004	Underground; Island
●		Shanghai Circus World	上海马戏城		0.93	23.93	42	Jing'an	28 Dec 2004	Underground; Island
●		Wenshui Road	汶水路		1.44	25.37	45	Jing'an	28 Dec 2004	Elevated; Side
●		Pengpu Xincun	彭浦新村		1.57	26.94	47	Jing'an	28 Dec 2004	Elevated; Side
●		Gongkang Road	共康路		1.39	28.33	50	Jing'an	28 Dec 2004	Elevated; Side
●		Tonghe Xincun	通河新村		1.44	29.77	53	Baoshan	28 Dec 2004	Elevated; Side
●		Hulan Road	呼兰路	18	1.01	30.78	55	Baoshan	28 Dec 2004	Elevated; Side
●		Gongfu Xincun	共富新村		1.75	32.53	58	Baoshan	28 Dec 2004	Elevated; Side
●		Bao'an Highway	宝安公路		1.64	34.17	60	Baoshan	29 Dec 2007	Elevated; Side
●		West Youyi Road	友谊西路		1.32	35.49	62	Baoshan	29 Dec 2007	Elevated; Side
●		Fujin Road	富锦路		1.27	36.76	65	Baoshan	29 Dec 2007	Elevated; Side & Island

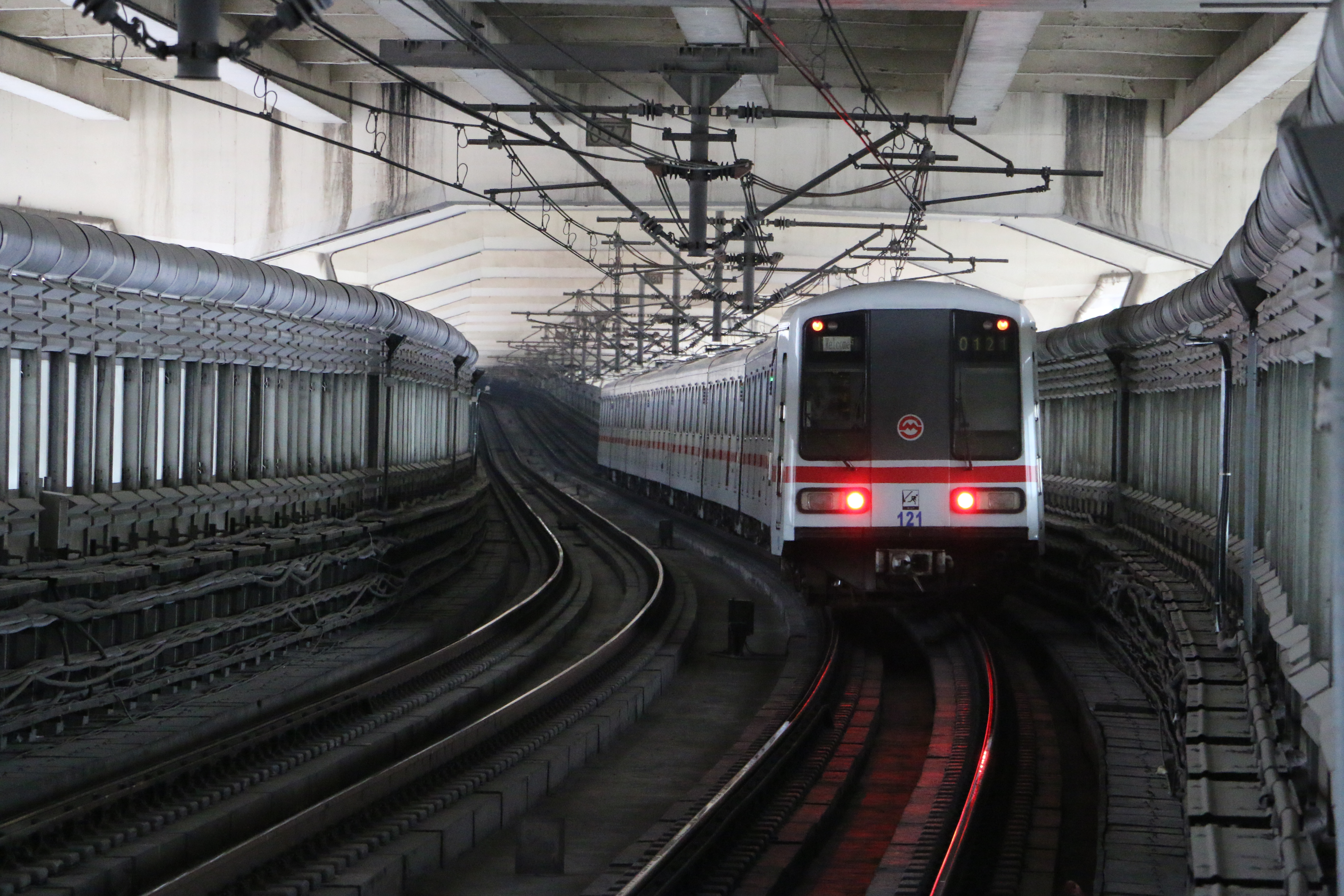
Set 121 of 01A03 running under the North–South Elevated Road.

=== Important stations ===
- Shanghai Railway Station – Connects the metro with the main railway station in the city, allowing rail transport to and from other provinces. Virtual Interchange with lines 3 and 4.
- People's Square – This station serves a business and shopping area, and is also close to multiple tourist attractions making the station busy all day long. Interchange with lines 2 and 8.
- Xujiahui – This is a business and commercial area, also with tourist attractions such as the Xujiahui Cathedral. Interchange with lines 9 and 11.
- Shanghai Indoor Stadium – This station is located at the sports stadium of the same name and the biggest regional and long-distance bus station in the city. Interchange with line 4.
- Shanghai South Railway Station – This station serves the second railway station of the city, which accommodates trains serving cities mainly to the south. Interchange with lines 3 and 15.
- Xinzhuang – The southern terminus of line 1; interchange with line 5.

=== Future expansion ===
==== West extension of line 1 ====
A 1.2 km (0.75 mi) extension to Humin road (North Xinzhuang Station) has been approved as part of the National Development and Reform Commission has approved the 2018–2023 construction planning of the city's Metro network. Work is expected to begin before 2023 and will take 4 years at acost of US$518. The extension will connect to the under construction Jiamin line.

== Headways ==
Shanghai Metro Line 1 headway
Time		Xinzhuang – Shanghai Railway Station	Shanghai Railway Station – Fujin Road
Monday – Thursday
AM peak	7:00–9:00	About 2 min and 30 sec	
Off-peak	9:00–17:00	About 4 min	About 6 min
PM peak	17:00–19:00	About 3 min	
Other hours	Before 7:00 After 19:00	About 4 – 9 min	
Friday
AM peak	7:00–9:00	2 min and 30 sec	
Off-peak	9:00–14:30	About 4 min	About 6 min
PM peak	14:30–17:00	About 4 min	
PM peak	17:00–19:00	About 3 min	
Other hours	Before 7:00 After 21:00	About 4 – 9 min	
Saturday and Sunday (Weekends)
Peak	9:00–20:00	About 4 min	
Other hours	Before 9:00 After 20:00	About 6 - 12 min	

== Technology ==
=== Signaling ===
Trip in the Line 1.

As the first line in the system, Shanghai Metro was conceived and designed during 1980s, when fixed block signalling and track circuit based train control (TBTC) was still considered a state-of-art approach to automatic train operation. The signalling system was designed by CASCO, a signalling manufacturer owned jointly by China Railway Signal & Communication Group Corporation (CRSC) and General Railway Signal (GRS), and was largely based on the system designed by GRS for the Washington Metro. Coded audio-frequency (AF) track circuits are used for both train detection and transmission of speed commands, as well as limited train-to-wayside communication (TWC) for automatic train supervision (ATS). Train operation between stations and station stop can be automatic, while doors are controlled manually by train operators.

From 2013 to 2019, the system was completely renewed, with obsolete components such as relay interlockings replaced by modern microprocessor-based ones, but the general operation of the signaling system remained unchanged. As of 2020, the original design is expected to serve two additional decades.

=== Rolling Stock ===
In the summer of 2006 after poor cooling affected 16 DC01 sets on Line 1 in the summer, high temperatures inside the carriages had long been a problem, 96 ice cubes have been put into a one-meter-high waste container to alleviate the high temperature of the 16 DC trains on Line 1. In order to make up for the defects in the refrigeration power and design of the 16 DC trains, emergency measures must be taken whenever the temperature reaches 33 °C (91 °F) or more. With the transformation between 2006 and 2008 from 6 carriages to 8 carriages the air conditioners of the trains were improved and modernized, making ice waste containers a thing of the past.

The line was initially operated by trains built by the German Shanghai Metro Group which included Adtranz (later Bombardier) and Siemens together with AEG Westinghouse and Düwag.

All are Class A (Note: Class A carriage: 21-24m in length, 3.0m in width and 3.8m in height; Capacity: about 310 people.) trains 8 cars in length.

Shanghai Metro Line 1 rolling stock
Fleet numbers	Manufacturer	Time of manufac- turing	Class	No. of car	Assembly	Rolling stock	Number	Notes
128			A	8		01A05		Line 1

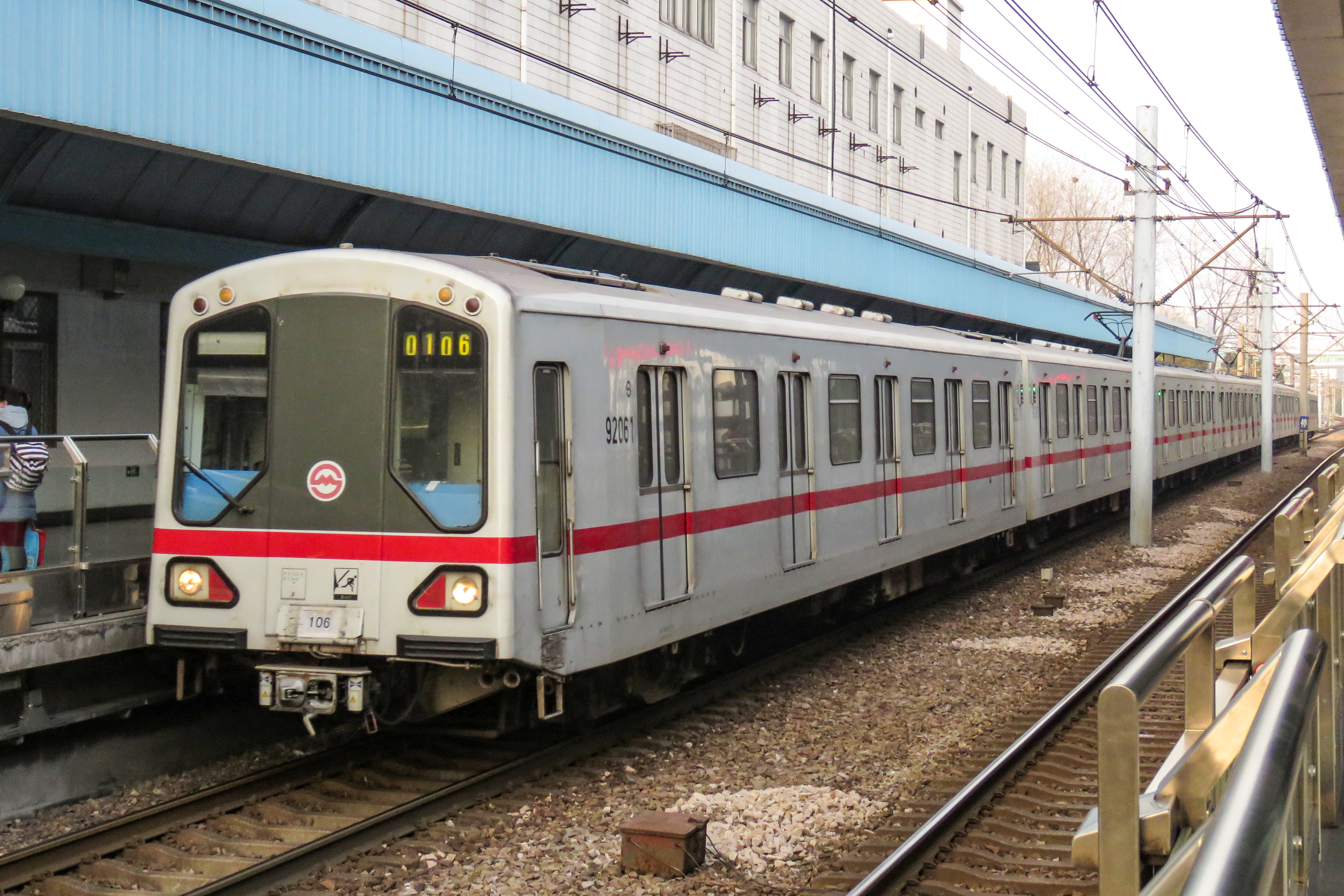
01A01 train

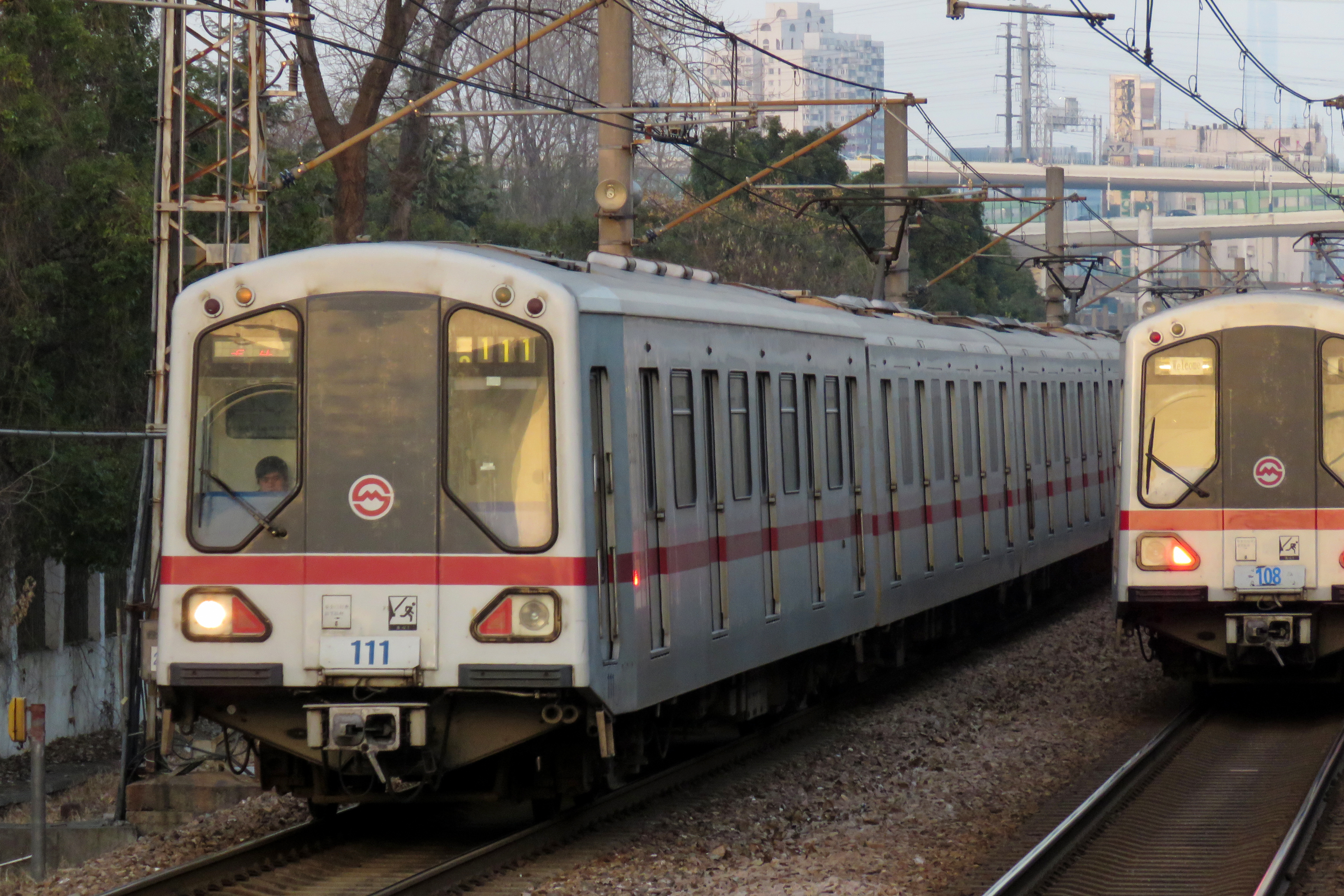
01A02 train

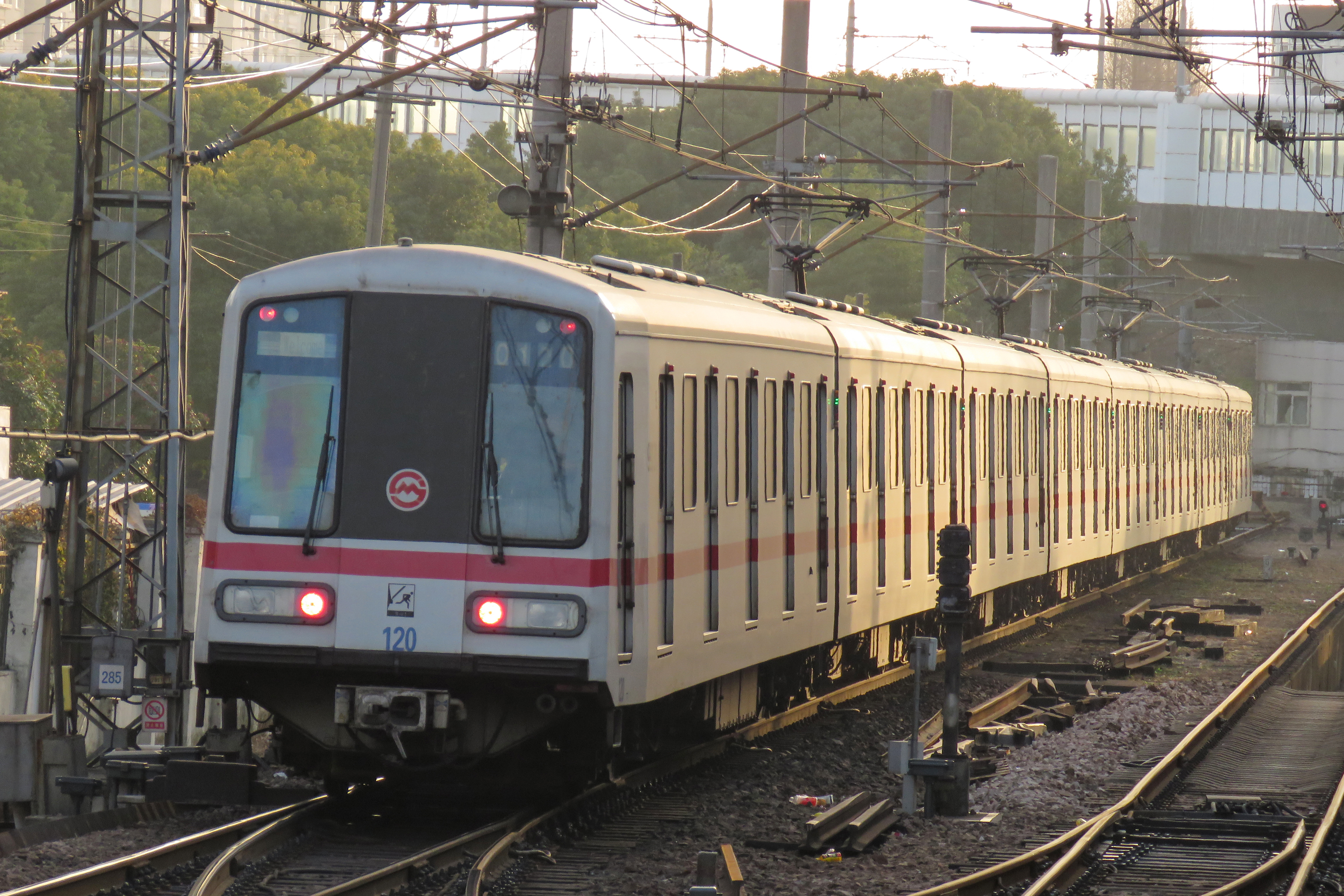
01A03 train

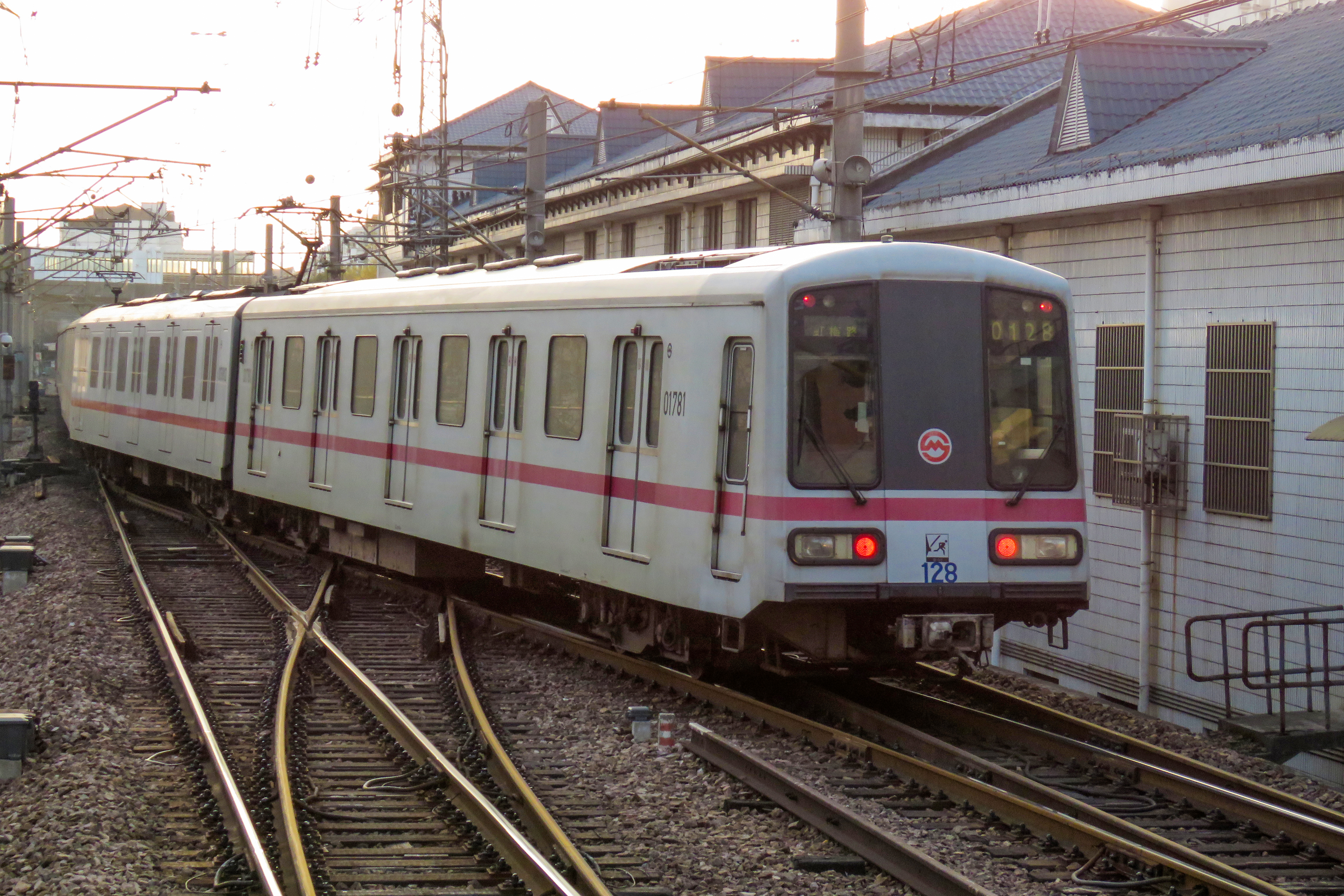
01A04 train

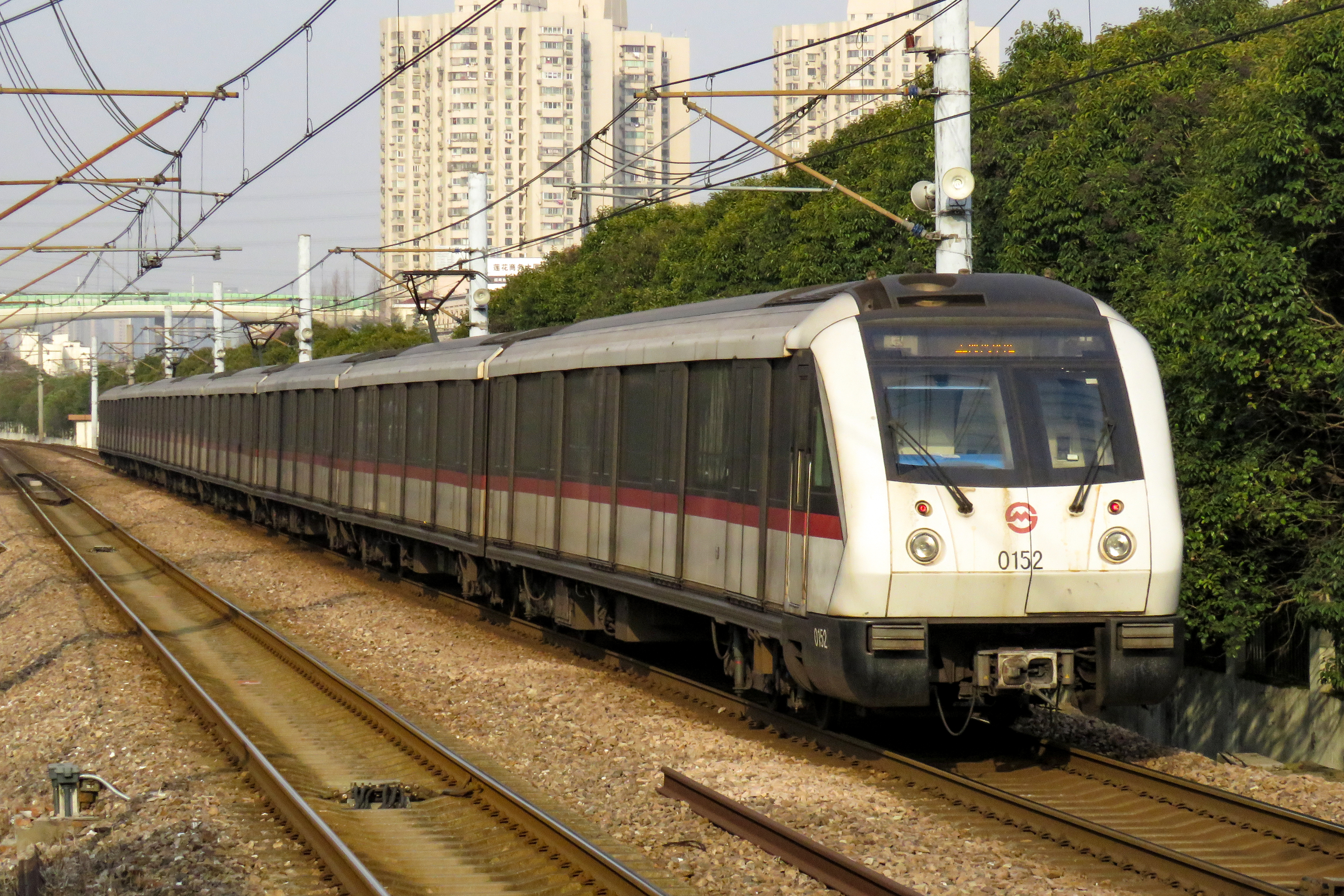
01A05 train

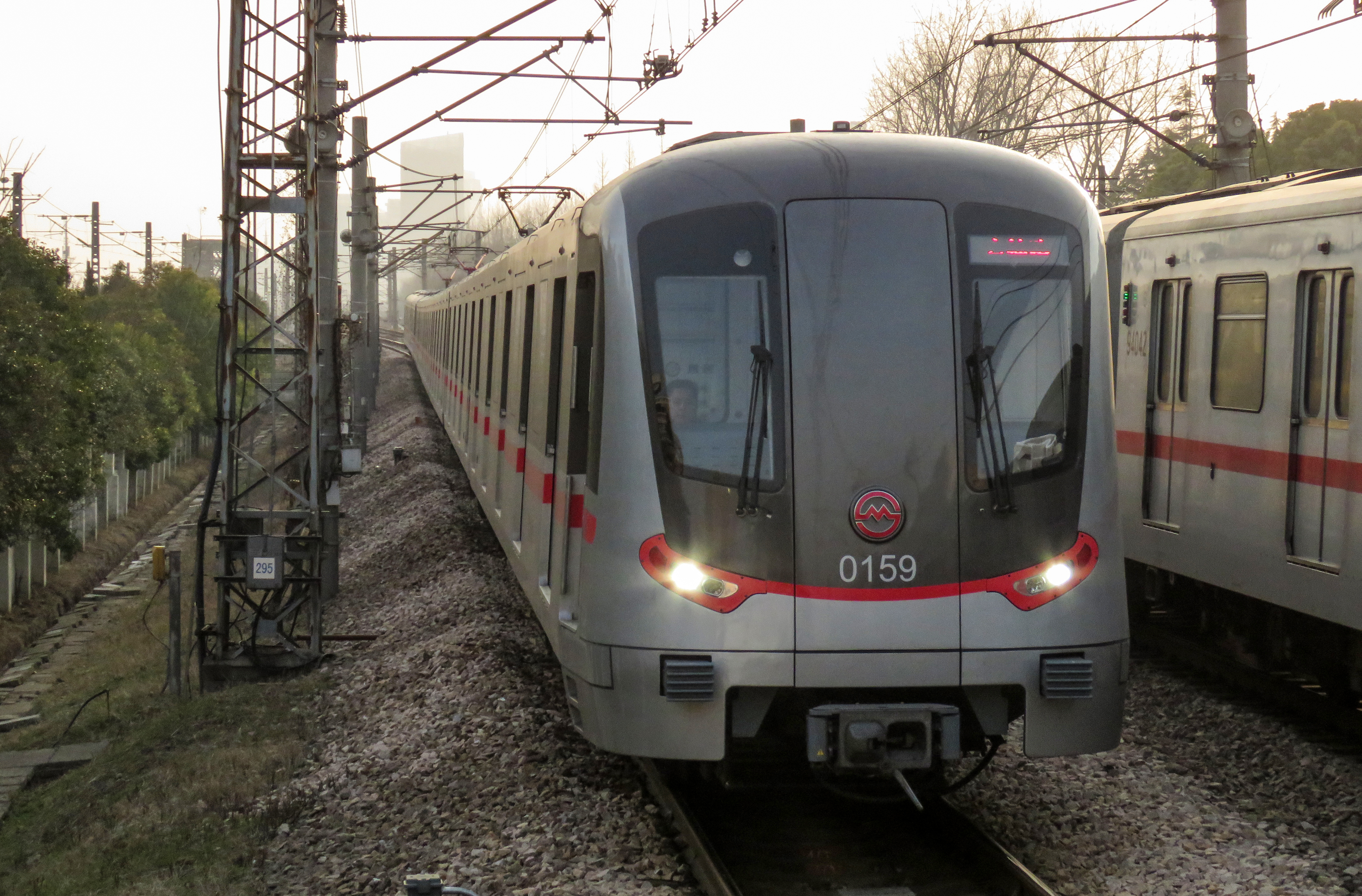
01A06 train

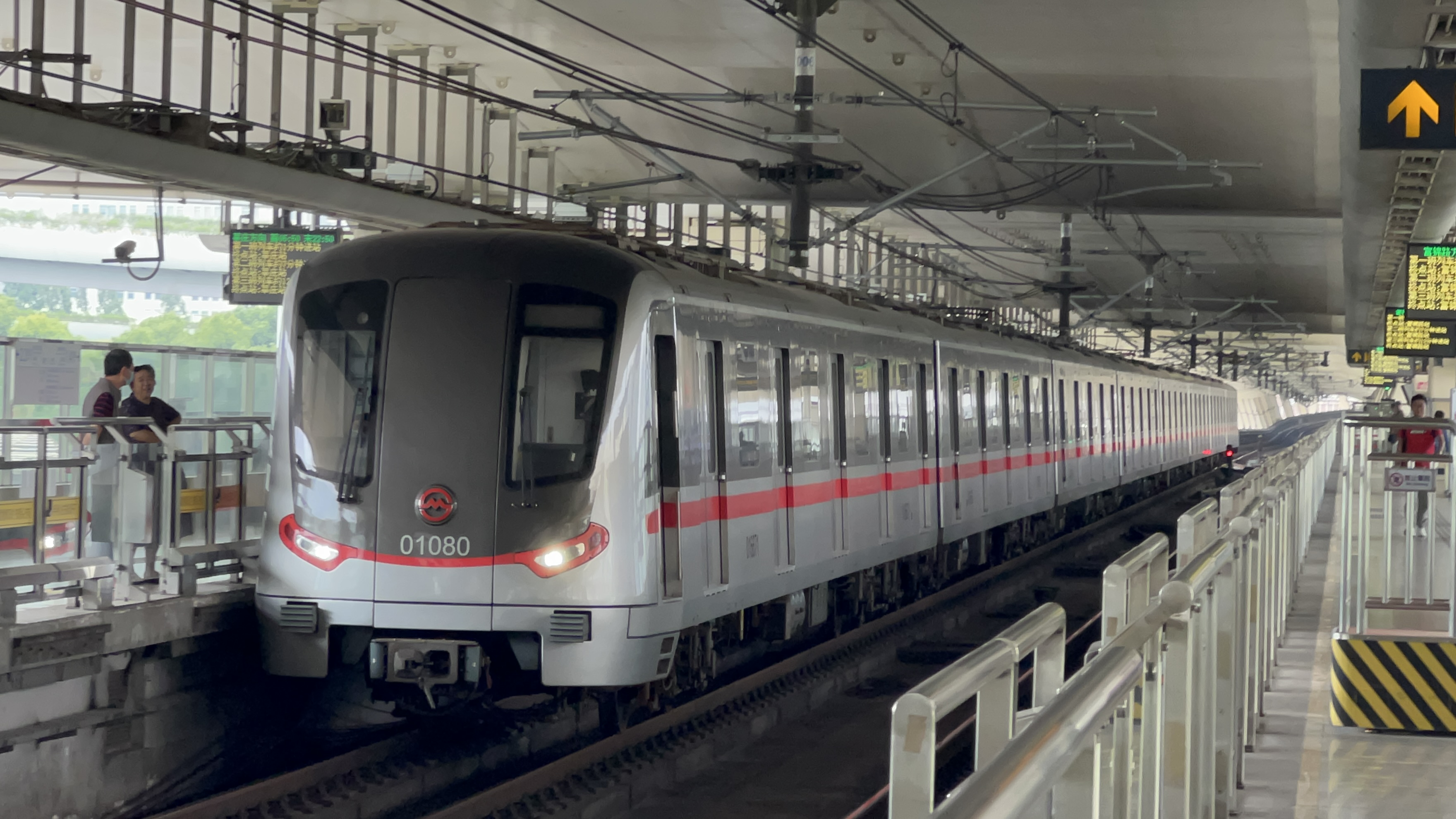
01A07 train
