= Gongfu Xincun station =

Shanghai Metro station

Gongfu Xincun 共富新村
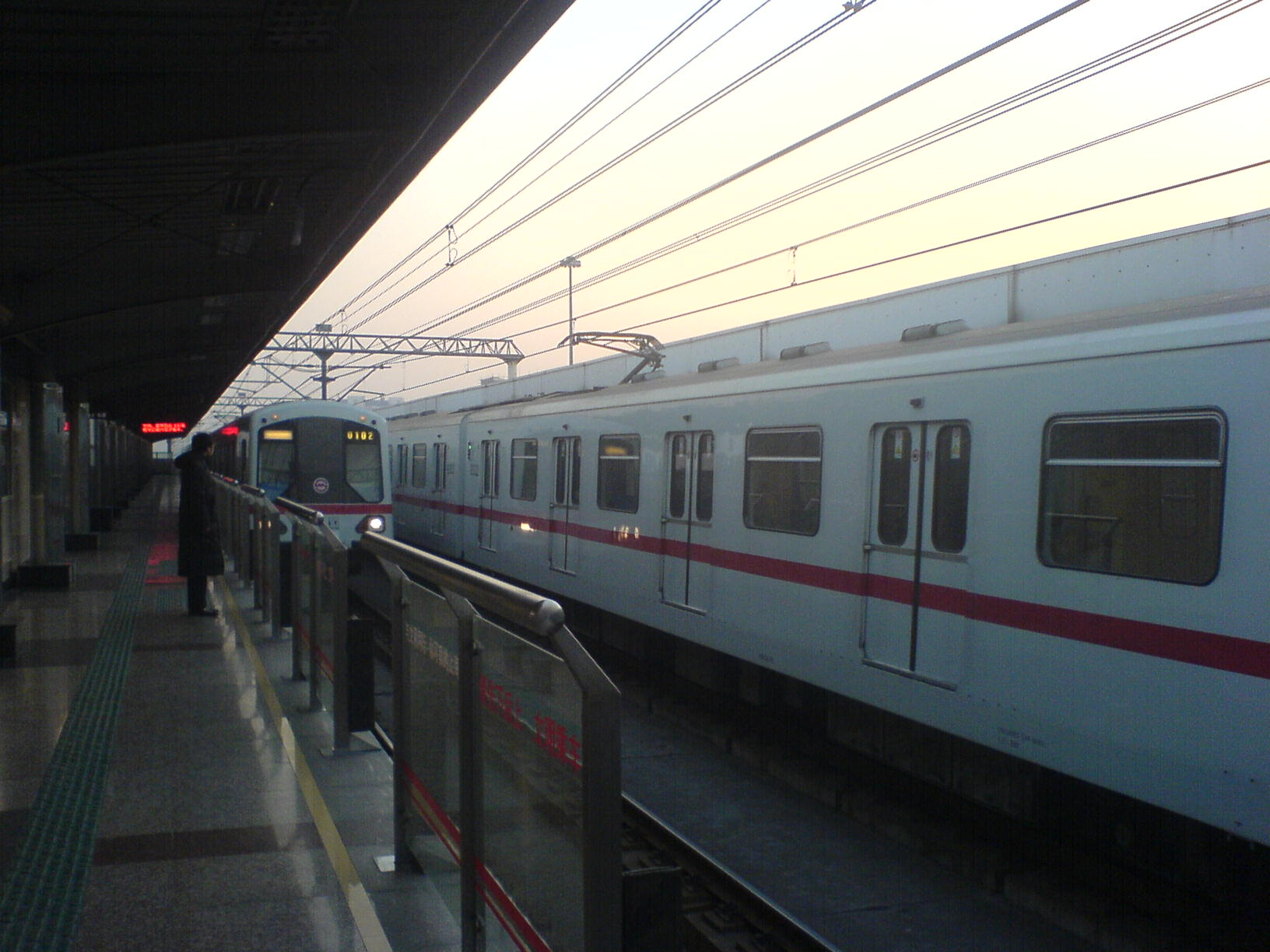
- Station platform

General information
- Location: Wenchuan Highway (蕰川路) and West Taihe Road (泰和西路); Baoshan District, Shanghai; China
- Coordinates: 31°21′18″N 121°26′03″E
- Operator: Shanghai No. 1 Metro Operation Co. Ltd.
- Line: Line 1
- Platforms: 2 (2 side platforms)
- Tracks: 2

Construction
- Structure type: Elevated
- Accessible: Yes

Other information
- Station code: L01/25

History
- Opened: 28 December 2004

Services
Preceding station	Shanghai Metro	Following station
Bao'an Highway towards Fujin Road	Line 1	Hulan Road towards Xinzhuang
Location
- Location within Shanghai

Gongfu Xincun (Chinese: 共富新村; pinyin: Gòngfù Xīncūn) is a station on Shanghai Metro Line 1. This station is part of the northern extension of Line 1 from Shanghai Railway Station that opened on 28 December 2004, and from then served as the northern terminus of line 1 until the extension to Fujin Road opened on 29 December 2007.
