= Fujin Road station =

Shanghai Metro station

Fujin Road 富锦路
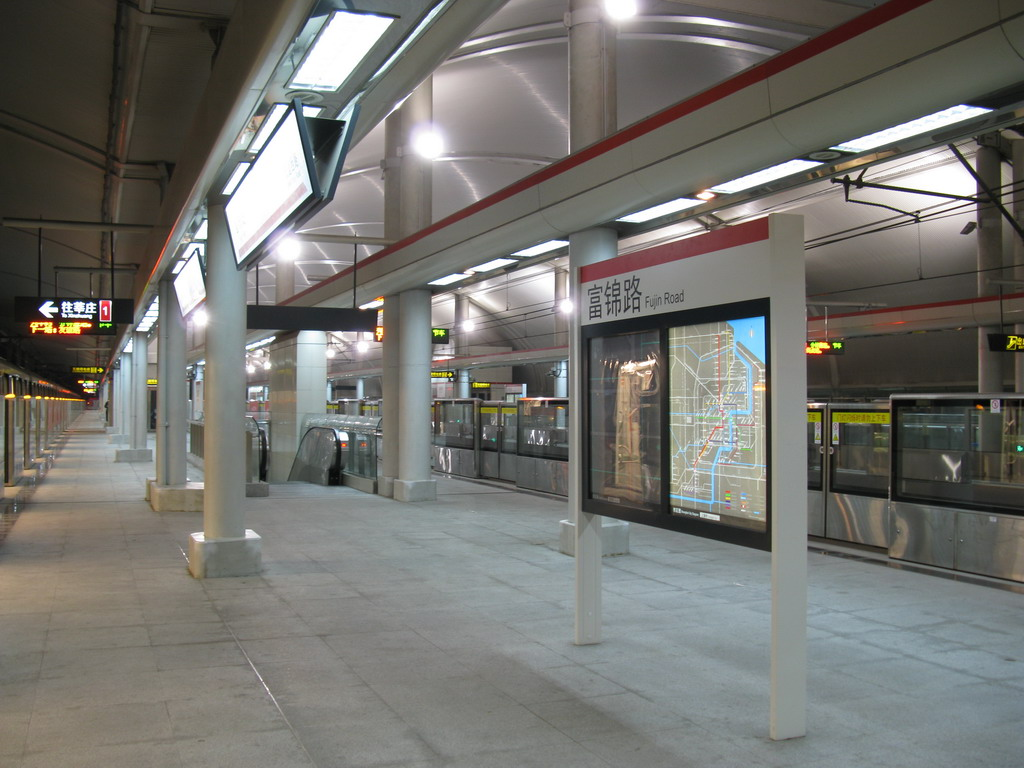
- Station platform at night

General information
- Location: Wenchuan Highway (蕰川路) and Fujin Road (富锦路); Yanghang, Baoshan District, Shanghai; China
- Coordinates: 31°23′32″N 121°25′29″E
- Operator: Shanghai No. 1 Metro Operation Co. Ltd.
- Line: Line 1
- Platforms: 3 (1 island and 1 side platform)
- Tracks: 3

Construction
- Structure type: Elevated
- Accessible: Yes

Other information
- Station code: L01/28

History
- Opened: 29 December 2007

Services
Preceding station	Shanghai Metro	Following station
Terminus	Line 1	West Youyi Road towards Xinzhuang
Location
- Location within Shanghai

Fujin Road (Chinese: 富锦路; pinyin: Fùjǐn Lù) is a station and the northern terminus of the Shanghai Metro Line 1. It is located at the intersection of Wenchuan Highway and Yangzong Road in Baoshan District. This station has been the northern terminus of line 1 since the northern extension from Gongfu Xincun on 29 December 2007.

The station has three tracks, one island platform, and one side platform. Only the outer island platform and the side platform are in use, with the side platform used for terminating Line 1 trains and the outer island platform for originating trains towards Xinzhuang.

== Exit list ==
Exit No.	Location
Exit 1	West side of Wenchuan Highway, south side of Yangbei Road
Exit 2	East side of Wenchuan Highway, north side of Yangzong Road
