= Line 24 (Shanghai Metro) =

Planned metro line in Shanghai, China

- 24

Overview
- Status: Planned
- Locale: Yangpu, Pudong; Shanghai
- Termini: Shanghai Baoshan Railway Station; Kangwu Road
- Stations: 27
- Website: www.shmetro.com

Service
- Type: Rapid transit
- System: Shanghai Metro
- Operator(s): Shanghai Metro Operation Co., Ltd.

Technical
- Number of tracks: 2
- Track gauge: 1,435 mm (4 ft 8 1/2 in)
- Electrification: Overhead lines (1500 volts)

Line 24 will be a future subway line on the Shanghai Metro. The line was announced by the Municipal government in 2016. It will run in a north–south direction through Pudong and connect the Huangpu River bank in Yangpu District with the Shanghai Science and Technology Museum. It will form a ring around the Middle Ring Road together with Line 20 and Line 22.

== Stations ==
=== Service routes ===
Shanghai metro line 24 service routes
M - Mainline: Shanghai North Railway Station ↔ Kangwu Road
| Routes | Station name | | Connections | Distance | | Location | Open- ing |
| M | English | Chinese | Connections | km | min | Location | Open- ing |
| | Shanghai Baoshan Railway Station | 上海宝山站 | 19 Baojia (planned) | 0.0 | 0 | Baoshan | Fourth phase of Shanghai rail transit construction plan |
| | Yanghang | 杨行 | | | | Baoshan | Fourth phase of Shanghai rail transit construction plan |
| | Tiecheng Road | 铁城路 | | | | Baoshan | Fourth phase of Shanghai rail transit construction plan |
| | South Jiangyang Road | 江杨南路 | 18 19 | | | Baoshan | Fourth phase of Shanghai rail transit construction plan |
| | Anda Road | 安达路 | | | | Baoshan | Fourth phase of Shanghai rail transit construction plan |
| | Zhanghuabang | 张华浜 | 3 | | | Baoshan | Fourth phase of Shanghai rail transit construction plan |
| | Guofan Road | 国帆路 | 10 | | | Yangpu | Fourth phase of Shanghai rail transit construction plan |
| | Zhayin Road | 闸殷路 | | | | Yangpu | Fourth phase of Shanghai rail transit construction plan |
| | Yinxing Road | 殷行路 | | | | Yangpu | Fourth phase of Shanghai rail transit construction plan |
| | Gongqing Forest Park | 共青森林公园 | 20 | | | Yangpu | Fourth phase of Shanghai rail transit construction plan |
| | Songhuajiang Road | 松花江路 | | | | Yangpu | Fourth phase of Shanghai rail transit construction plan |
| | Kongjiang Road | 控江路 | | | | Yangpu | Fourth phase of Shanghai rail transit construction plan |
| | Aiguo Road | 爱国路 | 12 | | | Yangpu | Fourth phase of Shanghai rail transit construction plan |
| | Tengyue Road | 腾越路 | 26 (planned) | | | Yangpu | Fourth phase of Shanghai rail transit construction plan |
| | Songpan Road | 松潘路 | | | | Yangpu | Fourth phase of Shanghai rail transit construction plan |
| | Xiepu Road | 歇浦路 | 14 | | | Pudong | Fourth phase of Shanghai rail transit construction plan |
| | Beiyangjing Road | 北洋泾路 | 6 | | | Pudong | Fourth phase of Shanghai rail transit construction plan |
| | Fangdian Road | 芳甸路 | 9 | | | Pudong | Fourth phase of Shanghai rail transit construction plan |
| | Yingchun Road | 迎春路 | 18 | | | Pudong | Fourth phase of Shanghai rail transit construction plan |
| | Shanghai Science and Technology Museum | 上海科技馆 | 2 27 (planned) | | | Pudong | Fourth phase of Shanghai rail transit construction plan |
| | Pujian Road | 浦建路 | | | | Pudong | Fourth phase of Shanghai rail transit construction plan |
| | Jinxiu Road | 锦绣路 | 7 | | | Pudong | Fourth phase of Shanghai rail transit construction plan |
| | Xianan Road | 下南路 | 13 | | | Pudong | Fourth phase of Shanghai rail transit construction plan |
| | Yanglian Road | 杨莲路 | 26 (planned) | | | Pudong | Fourth phase of Shanghai rail transit construction plan |
| | Kangheng Road | 康恒路 | 11 | | | Pudong | Fourth phase of Shanghai rail transit construction plan |
| | Xiupu Road | 秀浦路 | | | | Pudong | Fourth phase of Shanghai rail transit construction plan |
| | Kangwu Road | 康梧路 | | | | Pudong | Fourth phase of Shanghai rail transit construction plan |
