= Line 26 (Shanghai Metro) =

Future subway line on the Shanghai Metro

- 26

Overview
- Status: Planned
- Locale: Baoshan, Jing'an, Hongkou, Yangpu, Pudong, Minhang, Changning, Putuo, Jiading; Shanghai
- Stations: 56 (Loop + branch); 50 (Loop only)
- Website: www.shmetro.com

Service
- Type: Rapid transit
- System: Shanghai Metro
- Operator(s): Shanghai Metro Operation Co., Ltd.

Technical
- Track length: 77.87 km (48.39 mi) (Loop + Branch); 70.66 km (43.91 mi) (Loop only)
- Number of tracks: 2
- Track gauge: 1,435 mm (4 ft 8 1/2 in)
- Electrification: Overhead lines (1500 volts)

Line 26 is a future subway line on the Shanghai Metro. The line was announced by the Municipal government in 2016.

Line 26 will be Shanghai Metro's second loop line. It will be 77.87 km in length with 56 stations (loop + branch), of which 70.66 km and 50 stations on the loop.

== Stations ==
Note: The station list is incomplete and outdated.

=== Service routes ===
Shanghai metro line 26 service routes
M - Mainline: Xingzhi Road ↔ Zhenhua Road
Routes	Station name		Connections	Distance		Location	Open- ing
M	English	Chinese	Connections	km	min	Location	Open- ing
— ↑ Loop line towards Zhenhua Road (Outer Loop) ↑ —
	Xingzhi Road	行知路	7 26 (branch)	0.0	0	Baoshan	Fourth phase of Shanghai rail transit construction plan
	Shanghai Circus World	上海马戏城	1 20			Jing'an	Fourth phase of Shanghai rail transit construction plan
	Guangling 4th Road	广灵四路	19			Hongkou	Fourth phase of Shanghai rail transit construction plan
	Chifeng Road	赤峰路	3			Hongkou	Fourth phase of Shanghai rail transit construction plan
	Fushun Road	抚顺路	18			Yangpu	Fourth phase of Shanghai rail transit construction plan
	Middle Yanji Road	延吉中路	8			Yangpu	Fourth phase of Shanghai rail transit construction plan
	Longchang Road	隆昌路	12			Yangpu	Fourth phase of Shanghai rail transit construction plan
	Tengyue Road	腾跃路	24			Yangpu	Fourth phase of Shanghai rail transit construction plan
	Laiyang Road	莱阳路				Pudong	Fourth phase of Shanghai rail transit construction plan
	Boxing Road	博兴路	6			Pudong	Fourth phase of Shanghai rail transit construction plan
	Taierzhuang Road	台儿庄路	9 13			Pudong	Fourth phase of Shanghai rail transit construction plan
	Yunshun Road	云顺路	14			Pudong	Fourth phase of Shanghai rail transit construction plan
	Yangjia Town	杨家镇				Pudong	Fourth phase of Shanghai rail transit construction plan
	Jinke Road	金科路	2 27			Pudong	Fourth phase of Shanghai rail transit construction plan
	Zhangheng Road	张衡路				Pudong	Fourth phase of Shanghai rail transit construction plan
	Middle Huaxia Road	华夏中路	13 16			Pudong	Fourth phase of Shanghai rail transit construction plan
	Lianxi Road	莲溪路	13 18			Pudong	Fourth phase of Shanghai rail transit construction plan
	Yanglian Road	杨莲路	24			Pudong	Fourth phase of Shanghai rail transit construction plan
	Gaoqing Road	高青路	6			Pudong	Fourth phase of Shanghai rail transit construction plan
	Shangnan Road	上南路	6			Pudong	Fourth phase of Shanghai rail transit construction plan
	Lingzhao Xincun	凌兆新村	8 19			Pudong	Fourth phase of Shanghai rail transit construction plan
	Longrui Road	龙瑞路	23			Xuhui	Fourth phase of Shanghai rail transit construction plan
	Luoxiu Road	罗秀路	15			Xuhui	Fourth phase of Shanghai rail transit construction plan
	Lianhua Road	莲花路	1			Minhang	Fourth phase of Shanghai rail transit construction plan
	Gudai Road	顾戴路	12			Minhang	Fourth phase of Shanghai rail transit construction plan
	Hechuan Road	合川路	9			Minhang	Fourth phase of Shanghai rail transit construction plan
	Jinhui Road	金汇路	25 (planned)			Changning	Fourth phase of Shanghai rail transit construction plan
	Shanghai Zoo	上海动物园	10			Changning	Fourth phase of Shanghai rail transit construction plan
	West Xianxia Road	仙霞西路	17 (planned)			Changning	Fourth phase of Shanghai rail transit construction plan
	Songhong Road	淞虹路	2			Changning	Fourth phase of Shanghai rail transit construction plan
	South Qilianshan Road	祁连山南路	13			Putuo	Fourth phase of Shanghai rail transit construction plan
	Zhenxin Xincun	真新新村	14			Jiading	Fourth phase of Shanghai rail transit construction plan
	Qilianshan Road	祁连山路	11 20			Putuo	Fourth phase of Shanghai rail transit construction plan
	Gulang Road	古浪路	15			Putuo	Fourth phase of Shanghai rail transit construction plan
	Zhenhua Road	真华路				Baoshan	Fourth phase of Shanghai rail transit construction plan
— ↓ Loop line towards Xingzhi Road (Inner Loop) ↓ —
Branch line (from Xingzhi Road)
	Shaoniancun Road	少年村路				Baoshan
	Baode Road	保德路				Baoshan
	Kangning Road	康宁路				Baoshan
