= Line 26 =

Line 26 may refer to:

- Belgian railway line 26, a railway line in Belgium connecting Brussels to Halle
- Line 26 (Shanghai Metro), a future subway line on the Shanghai Metro
- Amsterdam tram line 26, a tram line operating between Amsterdam Centraal station and the IJburg district in Amsterdam, the Netherlands
- Line 26 (Beijing Subway), a medium-low speed maglev line in Beijing, China
- Line 26 (Guangzhou Metro), a planned subway line in Guangzhou, China
