= South Jiangyang Road station =

Metro station in Shanghai, China

South Jiangyang Road 江杨南路

General information
- Location: Baoshan District, Shanghai; China
- Coordinates: 31°21′07″N 121°27′41″E
- Lines: Line 18; Line 19
- Platforms: 2 island platforms
- Tracks: 4

Construction
- Structure type: Underground
- Accessible: Yes

History
- Opening: December 2027; 1 year's time (planned)

Services
Preceding station	Shanghai Metro	Following station
Future services
Aihui Road towards Kangwen Road	Line 18	West Changjiang Road towards Hangtou
Taihe Road towards Shanghai Baoshan Railway Station	Line 19	East Huma Road towards Hongjian Road
Location

South Jiangyang Road (Chinese: 江杨南路站; pinyin: Jiāngyáng Nán Lù) is an unopened station of Shanghai Metro located in the district of Baoshan in Shanghai, China. It currently serves as an reserved station of the Line 18 and would become an interchange station between Line 18 and Line 19. The station is expected to open in December 2027.

== History ==
While the phase II of Line 18 opened in December 2025, the station, however, did not open alongside the service due to the construction of nearby areas.
