= Line 24 =

Line 24 may refer to:

- Line 24 (Guangzhou Metro)
- Line 24 (São Paulo Metro)
- Line 24 (Shanghai Metro)
- S24 (ZVV), a line on the Zürich S-Bahn
- Yizhuang line of Beijing Subway, also known as Line 24

== See also ==
- Route 24 (disambiguation)
