= Yongping Rd station =

Qingdao Metro station

Yongping Road 永平路
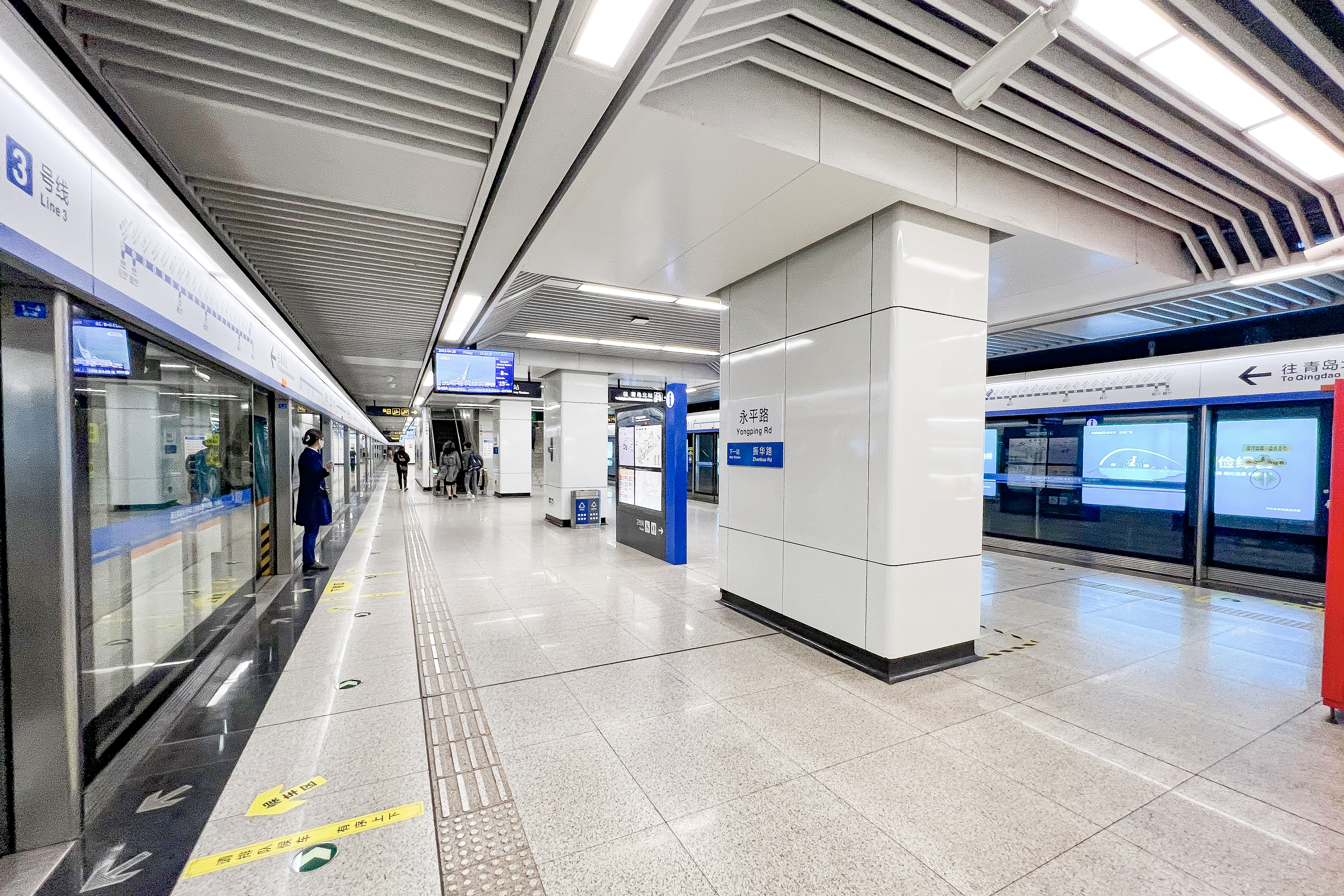

General information
- Location: Zhenhua Road × Yongping Road; Licang District, Qingdao, Shandong; China
- Coordinates: 36°10′N 120°23′E
- Operated by: Qingdao Metro Corporation
- Line: Line 3
- Platforms: 2 (1 island platform)

History
- Opened: 16 December 2015; 10 years ago

Services
Preceding station	Qingdao Metro	Following station
Zhenhua Road towards Qingdao Railway Station	Line 3	Qingdao North Railway Station Terminus
Location

Yongping Road (Chinese: 永平路) is a station of the Qingdao Metro on Line 3, which opened on 16 December 2015.
