= Line 23 (Shanghai Metro) =

Planned metro line in Shanghai, China

Overview
- Native name: 上海地铁23号线
- Status: Under construction
- Locale: Xuhui, Minhang; Shanghai, China
- Termini: Shanghai Stadium; Minhang Development Zone
- Connecting lines: 3 4 5 12 15 19
- Stations: 22
- Website: www.shmetro.com

Service
- Type: Rapid transit
- System: Shanghai Metro
- Operator(s): Shanghai No. Metro Operation Co., Ltd.
- Depot: Chengjiang Road Depot
- Rolling stock: Class A 6-car trains

History
- Work began: August 23, 2022; 4 years ago
- Planned opening: 2028; 2 years' time

Technical
- Track length: 28.5 km (18 mi)
- Number of tracks: 2
- Character: fully underground
- Track gauge: 1,435 mm (4 ft 8 1/2 in)
- Electrification: Overhead lines (1500 volts)
- Operating speed: 80 km/h (50 mph)

Line 23 is an under construction Shanghai Metro line that would run from Shanghai Indoor Stadium in Xuhui District to Minhang Development Zone in Minhang District. Its It is planned to be 29 kilometres (18 mi) in length, and is planned to have 22 stations. The line was announced by the Shanghai municipal government in 2016. It will adopt unmanned driving (GoA4).

The line will not utilise the existing branch Line 5 service between Dongchuan Road and Minhang Development Zone stations, with the line planned to be fully underground. Once complete, it will feature interchange stations with Lines 3, 4, 5, 12, 15, and 19. The construction period of this project is expected to be 74 months.

== History ==
Shanghai metro line 23 opening history
Segment	Commenced	Opened	Length	Station(s)	Name	Investment
Shanghai Stadium - Minhang Development Zone	23 Aug 2022	exp 2028	28.626 km (17.8 mi)	22	Phase 1	33.729 billion yuan

== Stations ==
=== Service routes ===
Shanghai metro line 23 service routes
M - Mainline: Shanghai Stadium ↔ Minhang Development Zone
Routes	Station name		Connections	Distance			Location	Open- ing
M	English	Chinese	Connections	km		min	Location	Open- ing
	Shanghai Stadium	上海体育场	4	0.0	0.0	0	Xuhui	Phase I 2028
	Longcao Road	龙漕路	3 12				Xuhui	Phase I 2028
	Longqi Road	龙启路					Xuhui	Phase I 2028
	Shanghai Botanical Garden	上海植物园					Xuhui	Phase I 2028
	Longwu Road	龙瑞路	26 (planned)				Xuhui	Phase I 2028
	Xupu Bridge	徐浦大桥					Xuhui	Phase I 2028
	Huajing Road	华泾路	19				Xuhui	Phase I 2028
	Jinglian Road	景联路					Xuhui	Phase I 2028
	North Wujing	吴泾北					Minhang	Phase I 2028
	Chengjiang Road	澄江路					Minhang	Phase I 2028
	Mojiang Road	墨江路					Minhang	Phase I 2028
	Beiwu Road	北吴路					Minhang	Phase I 2028
	Wujing	吴泾					Minhang	Phase I 2028
	Zilong Road	紫龙路					Minhang	Phase I 2028
	East China Normal University	华东师范大学					Minhang	Phase I 2028
	Zizhu Hi-tech Park	紫竹高新区	15				Minhang	Phase I 2028
	Jiaotong University Zizhu Road	交大紫竹路					Minhang	Phase I 2028
	Dongchuan Road	东川路	5				Minhang	Phase I 2028
	Jinping Road	金平路					Minhang	Phase I 2028
	Huaning Road	华宁路					Minhang	Phase I 2028
	Wenjing Road	文井路					Minhang	Phase I 2028
	Minhang Development Zone	闵行开发区			28.5		Minhang	Phase I 2028
