= Aihui Road station =

Shanghai Metro Line 18 station

Aihui Road 爱辉路
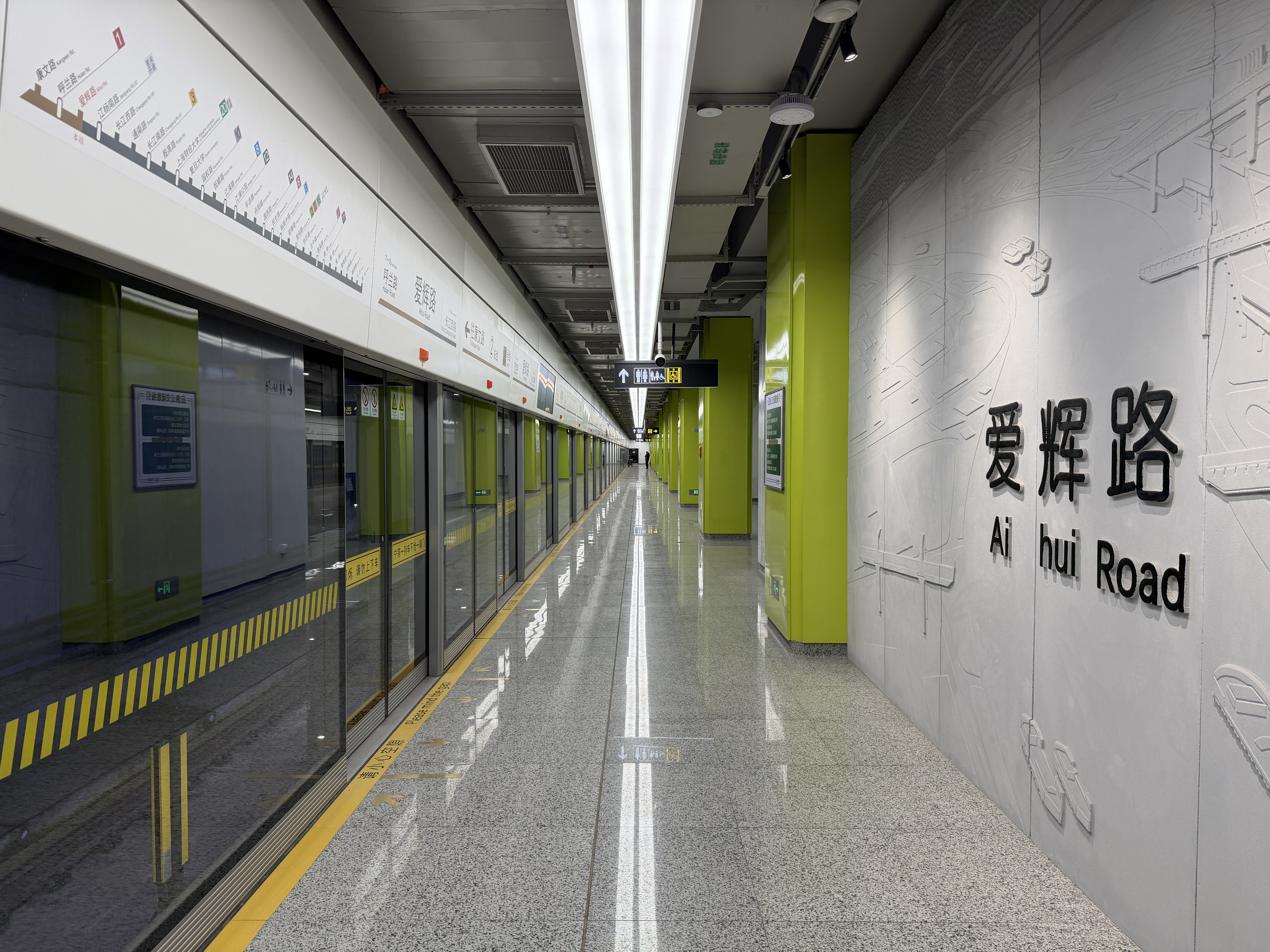
- Platform

General information
- Location: Baoshan District, Shanghai; China
- Coordinates: 31°20′45″N 121°26′40″E
- Line: Line 18
- Platforms: 2 (1 island platform)
- Tracks: 2

Construction
- Structure type: Underground
- Accessible: Yes

History
- Opened: 27 December 2025 (4 months ago)

Services
| Preceding station | Shanghai Metro | Following station |
|---|---|---|
| Hulan Road towards Kangwen Road | Line 18 | West Changjiang Road towards Hangtou |
Location

Aihui Road (Chinese: 爱辉路; pinyin: Aìhuī Lù) is a station on Shanghai Metro Line 18 located in the district of Baoshan in Shanghai, China. The station was officially opened on 27 December 2025.

== Structure ==
The station has an underground island platform. There are 3 entrance/exit gates.

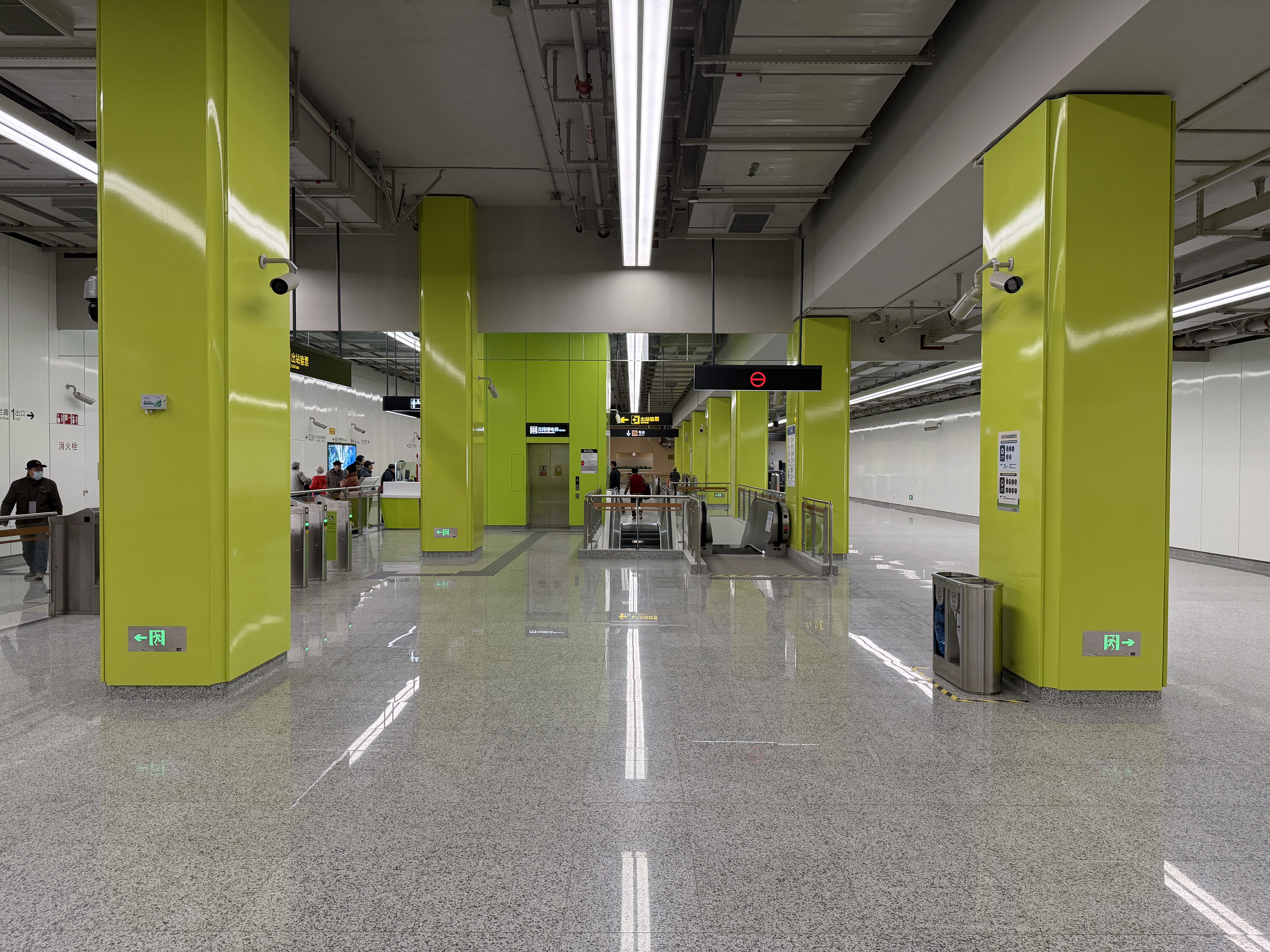
Concourse

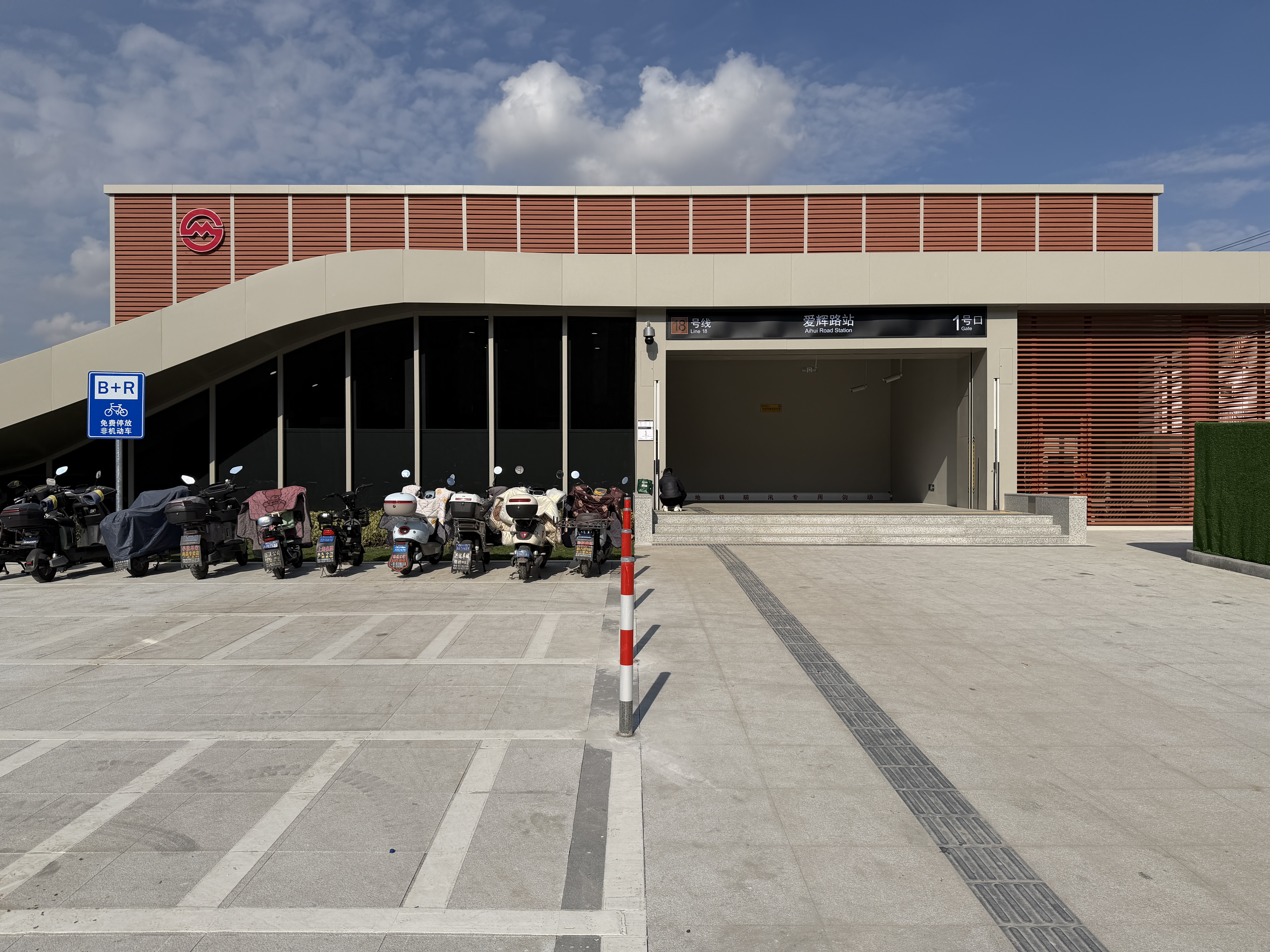
Gate 1

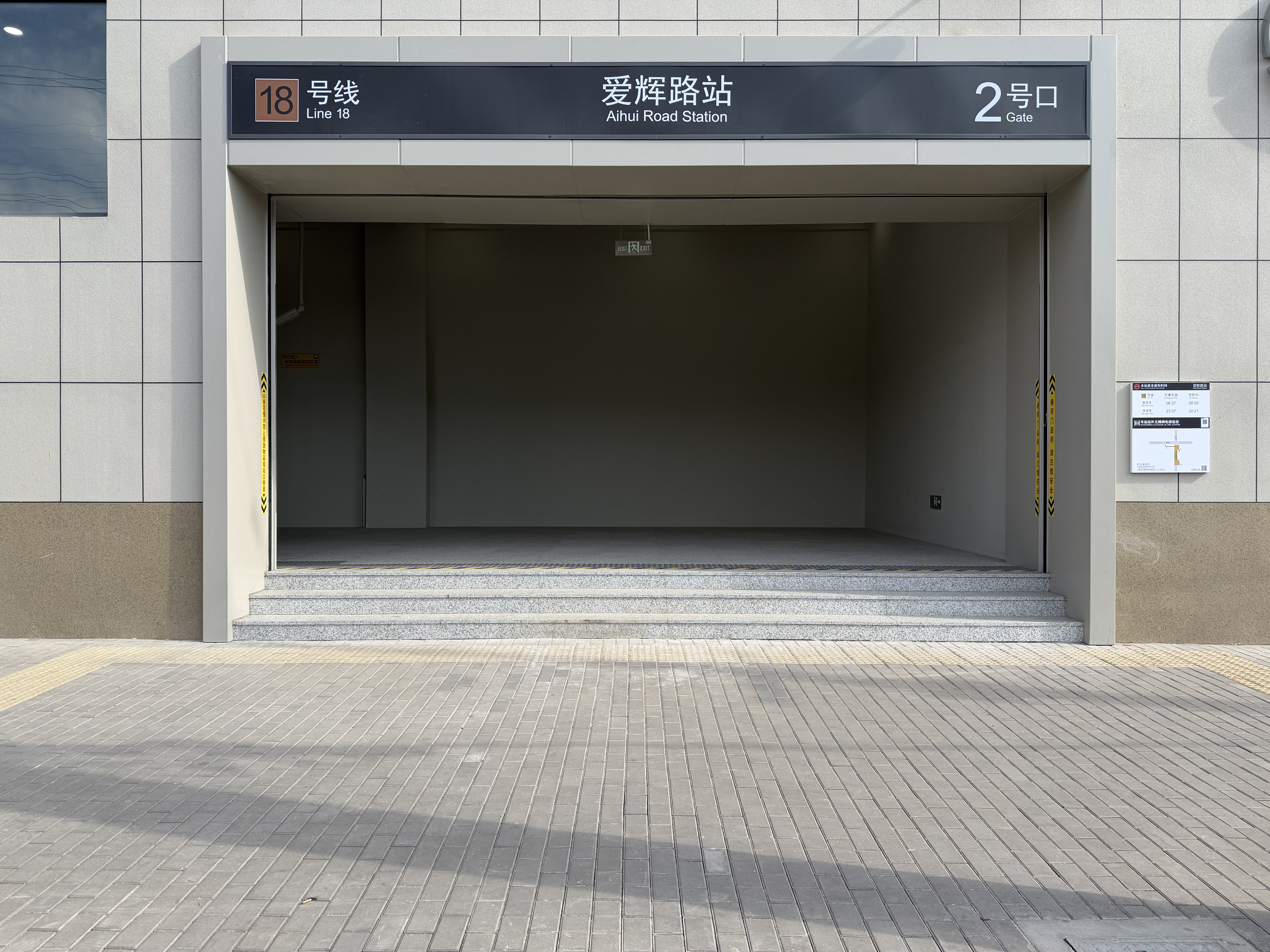
Gate 2

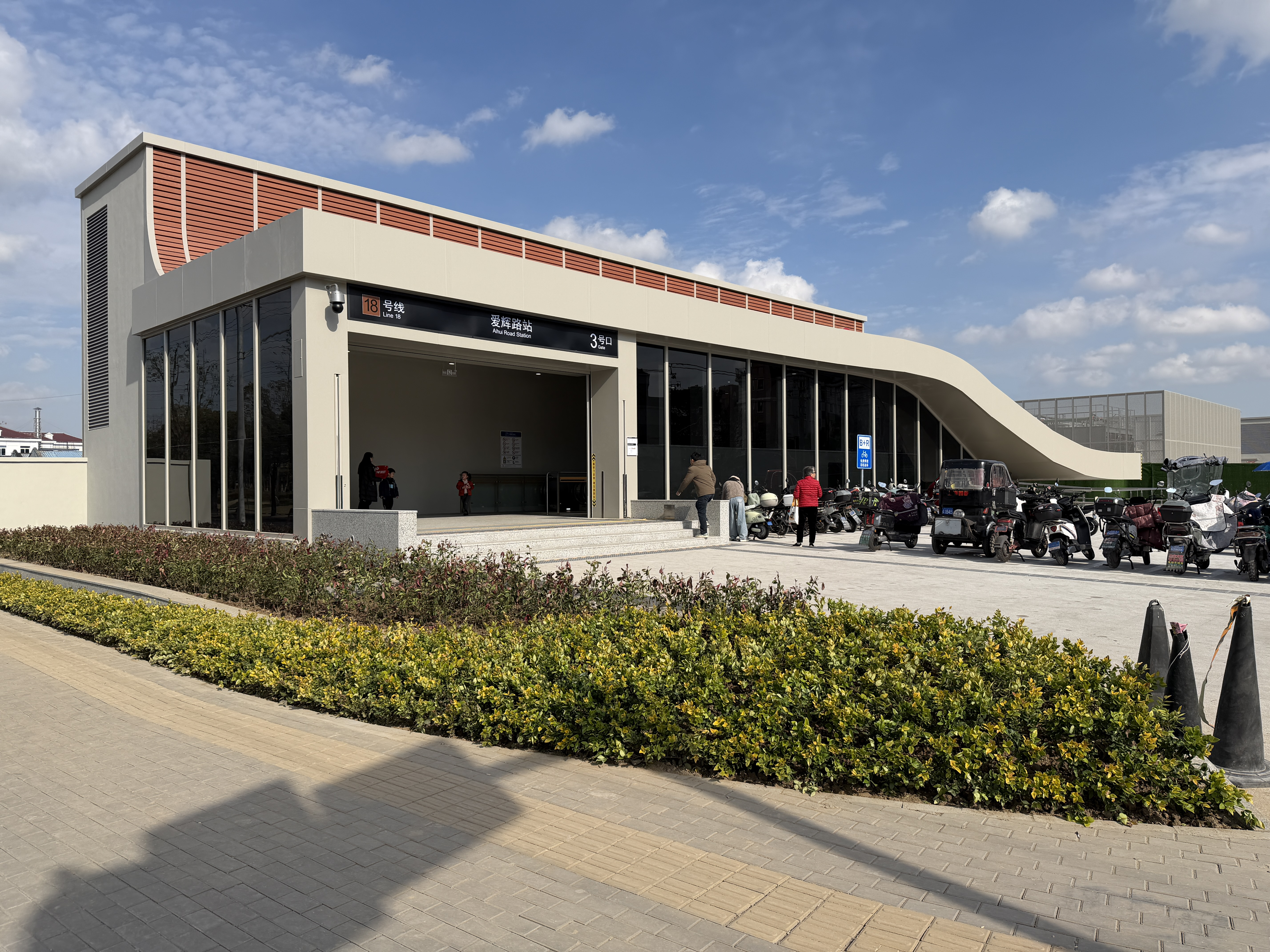
Gate 3
