= Route 24 (disambiguation) =

Route 24 may refer to:

- Route 24 (MTA Maryland), a bus route in the suburbs of Baltimore, Maryland, 1988–2017
- Lakeside Line, a streetcar line in Baltimore 1929–1950
- London Buses route 24
- 24 Divisadero, a bus route in San Francisco

== See also ==
- List of highways numbered 24
- Line 24 (disambiguation)
