= West Changjiang Road station =

Shanghai Metro Line 18 station

West Changjiang Road 长江西路
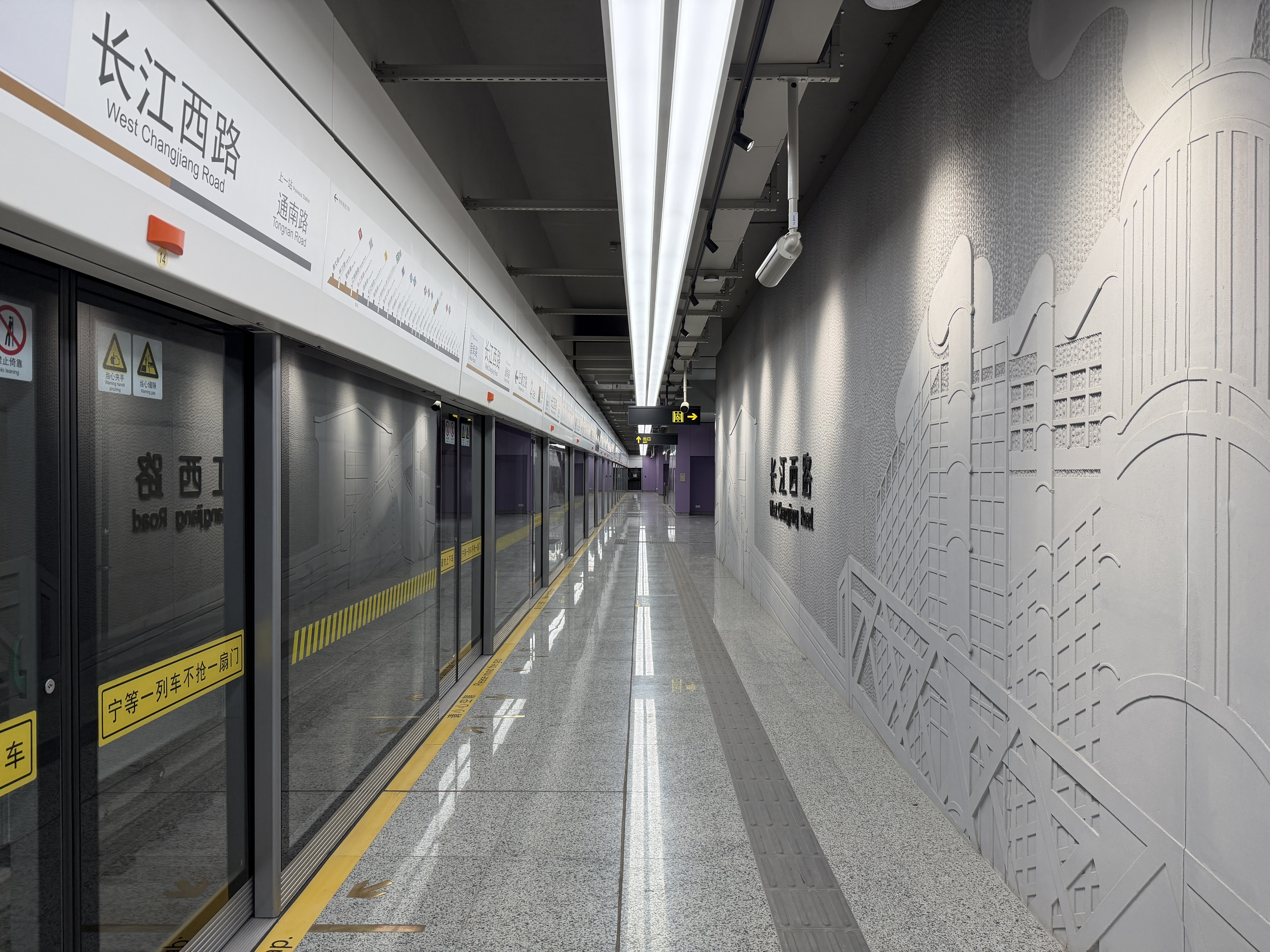
- Platform

General information
- Location: Baoshan District, Shanghai; China
- Coordinates: 31.3475°N 121.4709°E
- Line: Line 18
- Platforms: 2 (1 island platform)
- Tracks: 2

Construction
- Structure type: Underground
- Accessible: Yes

History
- Opened: 27 December 2025 (4 months ago)

Services
Preceding station	Shanghai Metro	Following station
Aihui Road towards Kangwen Road	Line 18	Tongnan Road towards Hangtou
Location

West Changjiang Road (Chinese: 长江西路; pinyin: Chángjiāng Xī Lù) is a station on Shanghai Metro Line 18 located in the district of Baoshan in Shanghai, China. The station was officially opened on 27 December 2025.

== Structure ==
The station has an underground island platform. There are 2 entrance/exit gates.

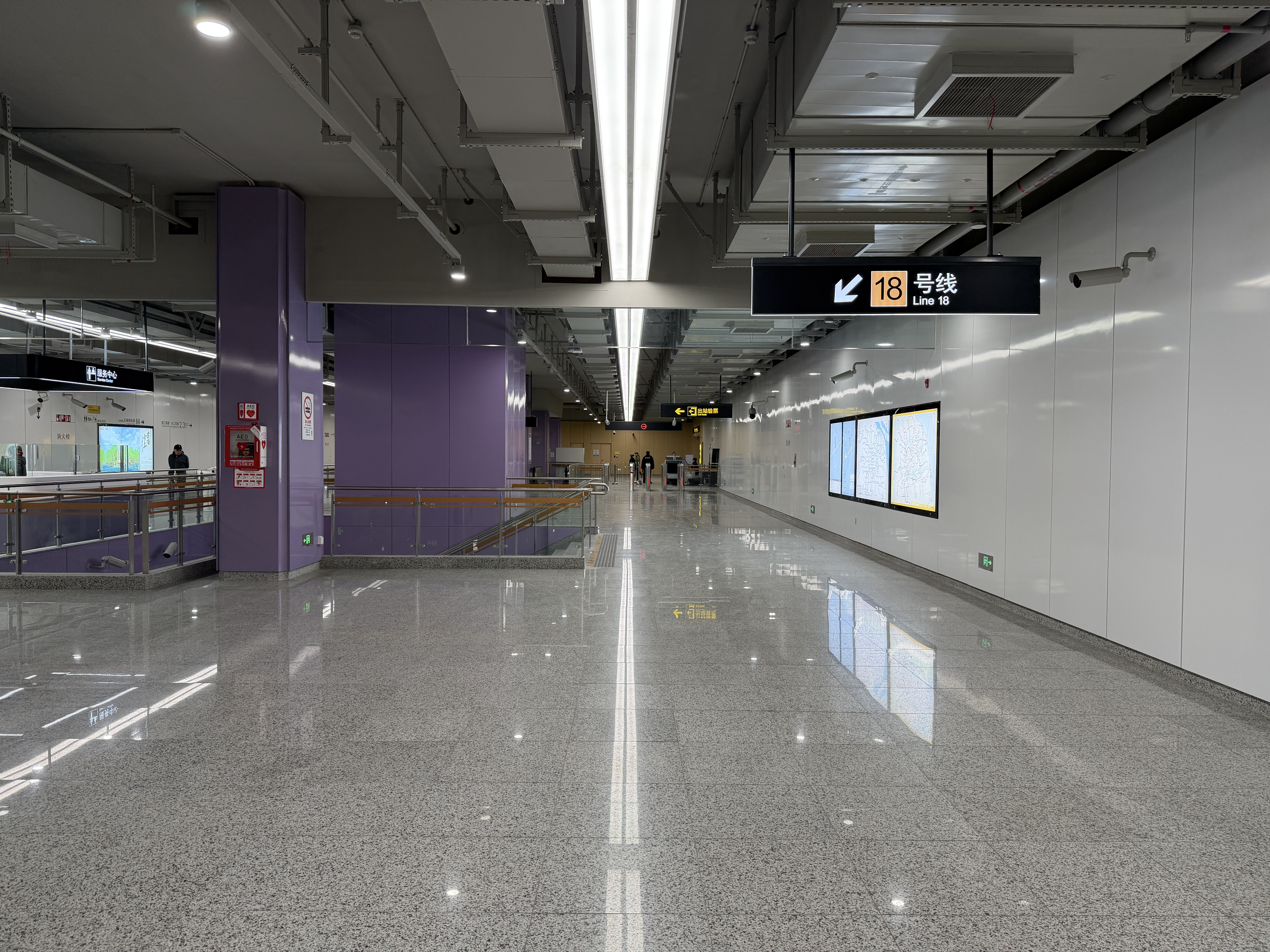
Concourse

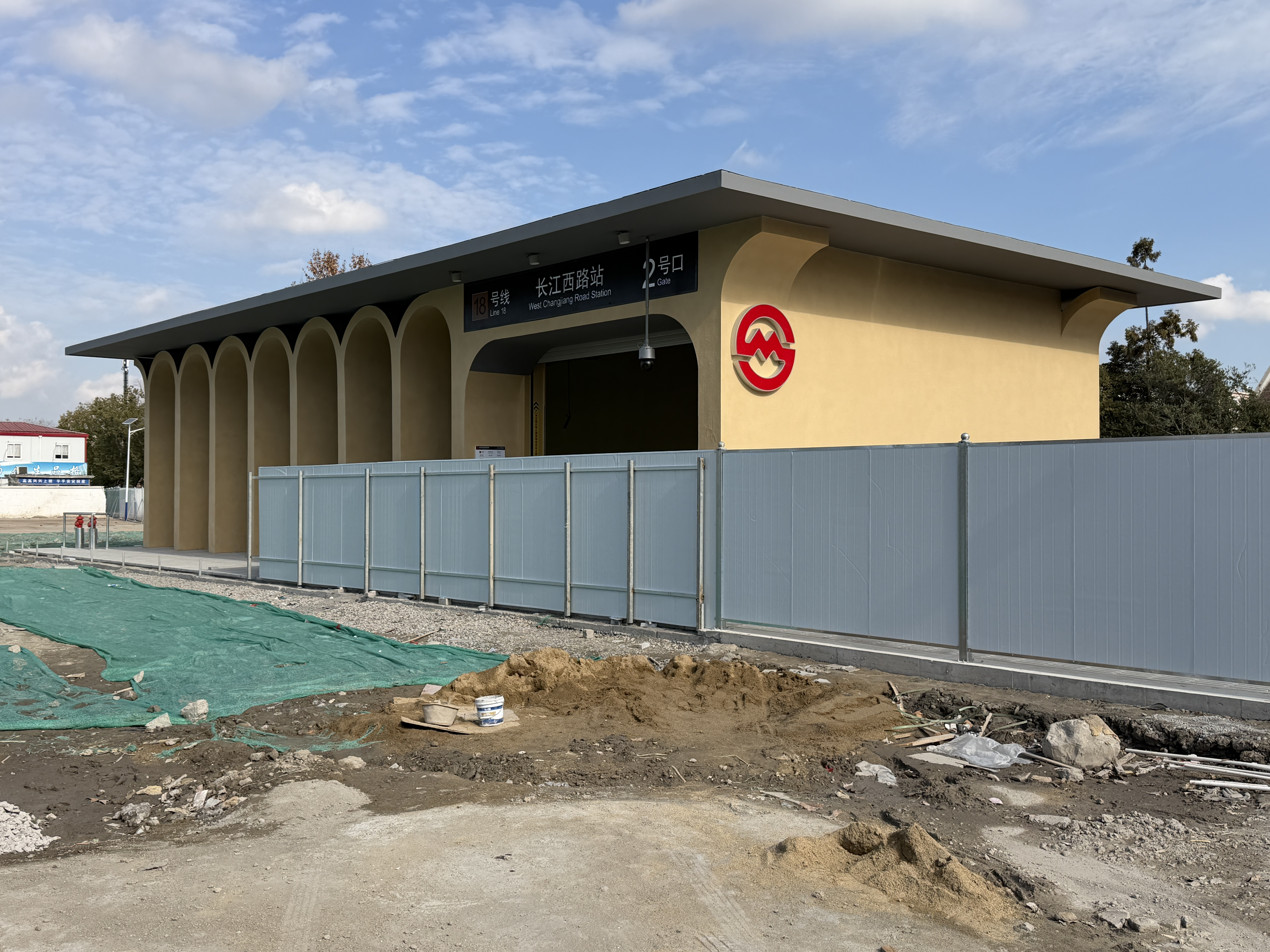
Gate 2

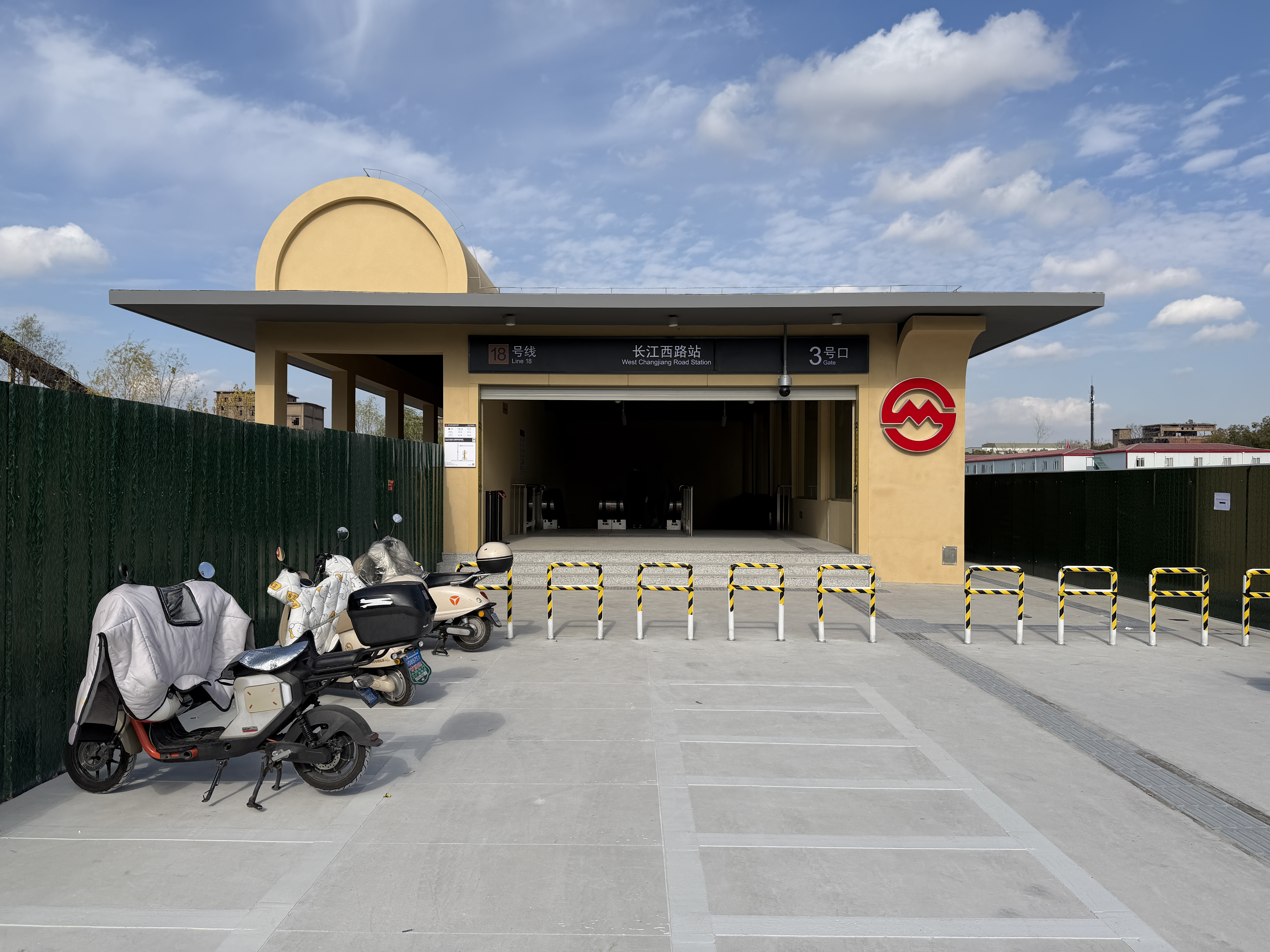
Gate 3
