= Line 20 (Shanghai Metro) =

Planned metro line in Shanghai, China

Overview
- Native name: 上海地铁20号线
- Status: Under construction
- Locale: Putuo, Baoshan, Jing'an, Yangpu, and Pudong, Shanghai
- Termini: Jiaotong Road; North Xinyuan Road
- Connecting lines: 1 3 7 8 10 11 15 18 19 21
- Stations: 21
- Website: www.shmetro.com

Service
- Type: Rapid transit
- System: Shanghai Metro
- Operator(s): Shanghai No. Metro Operation Co., Ltd.
- Depot(s): Zhenru Yard; Huadong Road Depot
- Rolling stock: Class A 6-car trains

History
- Work began: December 16, 2022; 3 years ago
- Planned opening: 2029; 3 years' time

Technical
- Track length: 23.8 km (14.8 mi)
- Number of tracks: 2
- Character: Fully underground
- Track gauge: 1,435 mm (4 ft 8 1/2 in)
- Electrification: Overhead lines (1500 volts)
- Operating speed: 80 km/h (50 mph)

Line 20 will be a future subway line on the Shanghai Metro. It will run in an east–west direction in northern Shanghai, connecting Shanghai West railway station in Jiading District to Gongqing Forest Park in Yangpu District, before extending to North Xinyuan Road in northern Pudong. It will be about 20 km (12 mi) long with 10 stations. The line was announced by the Municipal government in 2016.

== History ==
Shanghai metro line 20 opening history
Segment	Commenced	Opened	Length	Station(s)	Name	Investment
Jiaotong Road - Shanghai Circus World	16 Dec 2022	exp 2029	23.8 km (14.8 mi)	7	Phase 1 (1st section)	39.354 billion yuan
Shanghai Circus World - North Xinyuan Road	30 Dec 2024	exp 2031	23.8 km (14.8 mi)	14	Phase 1 (2nd section)	39.354 billion yuan

== Stations ==
Shanghai metro line 20 service routes
M - Mainline: Jiaotong Road ↔ North Xinyuan Road
Routes	Station name		Connections	Distance		Location	Open- ing
Routes	English	Chinese	Connections	km	min	Location	Open- ing
	Jiaotong Road	交通路		0.0	0	Putuo	2029
	Shanghai West Railway Station	上海西站	11 15			Putuo	2029
	Zhenhua Road	真华路				Putuo	2029
	Xincun Road	新村路	7			Putuo	2029
	Pingli Road	平利路				Putuo	2029
	Daning Park	大宁公园				Jing'an	2029
	Shanghai Circus World	上海马戏城	1			Jing'an	2029
	Liangcheng Road	凉城路	19			Hongkou	2031
	Guangling Second Road	广灵二路				Hongkou	2031
	South Chezhan Road	车站南路				Hongkou	2031
	Wan'an Road	万安路				Hongkou	2031
	Jiangwan Town	江湾镇	3			Yangpu	2031
	Shanghai University of Finance and Economics	上海财经大学	18			Yangpu	2031
	Sanmen Road	三门路	10			Yangpu	2031
	Shanghai University of Sport	上海体育大学				Yangpu	2031
	Nenjiang Road	嫩江路	8			Yangpu	2031
	Gongqing Forest Park	共青森林公园		19.8		Yangpu	2031
	North Pudong Road	浦东北路				Pudong	2031
	North Zhangyang Road	张杨北路				Pudong	2031
	West Tainan Road	台南西路				Pudong	2031
	North Xinyuan Road	北新园路		23.8		Pudong	2031
