= Line 19 (Shanghai Metro) =

Planned metro line in Shanghai, China

Overview
- Other name: M9 (planned name)
- Native name: 上海地铁19号线
- Status: Under construction
- Locale: Baoshan, Jing'an, Hongkou, Pudong, Xuhui, Minhang; Shanghai
- Termini: Baoshan Railway Station; Hongjian Road
- Connecting lines: 2 4 6 7 8 9 10 11 12 13 14 15 18 20 23
- Stations: 34
- Website: www.shmetro.com

Service
- Type: Rapid transit
- System: Shanghai Metro
- Operator: TBA
- Depot(s): Chengjiang Road Depot; Tieshan Road Yard
- Rolling stock: Class A 6-car trains

History
- Planned opening: May 2028; 1 year's time

Technical
- Track length: 46.2 km (28.7 mi)
- Number of tracks: 2
- Character: Underground and elevated
- Track gauge: 1,435 mm (4 ft 8 1/2 in)
- Electrification: Overhead lines (1500 volts)
- Operating speed: 80 km/h (50 mph)

Line 19 is an under construction subway line on the Shanghai Metro. Its termini are planned to be Baoshan Railway Station and Hongjian Road. It is planned to be 46.2 km (28.7 mi) in length, with 34 stations. The line hopes to ease car congestion along Pudong South Road, as well as reduce crowding on the southern part of line 8, and the northern sections of lines 1 and 3.

The line was announced by the Municipal government in 2016 and is planned to finish construction and open between Baoshan Railway Station and Yierba Jinian Road in May 2028. The south section between Hongjian Road and Shibo Avenue is planned to finish construction in 2029, and the middle section between Shibo Avenue and Yierba Jinian Road in 2031.

== History ==
On 5 March 2026, the tender for Civil Engineering Section 26 (Tieshan Road Yard) was issued, with a construction period of 792 days.

Shanghai metro line 19 opening history
Segment	Commenced	Opened	Length	Station(s)	Name	Investment
Baoshan Railway Station - Yierba Jinian Road	3 Mar 2024	exp May 2028	9.2 km (5.7 mi)	8	North section	93.889 billion yuan
Shibo Avenue - Hongjian Road	3 Mar 2024	2029	37 km (23.0 mi)	9	South section	93.889 billion yuan
Yierba Jinian Road - Shibo Avenue	3 Mar 2024	2031	37 km (23.0 mi)	17	Middle section	93.889 billion yuan
Houtan	3 Mar 2024	2031	Infill station	1	South section	93.889 billion yuan

== Stations ==
=== Service routes ===
Shanghai metro line 19 service routes
M - Mainline: Baoshan Railway Station ↔ Hongjian Road
Routes	Station name		Connections	Distance			Location	Open- ing
M	English	Chinese	Connections	km		min	Location	Open- ing
	Baoshan Railway Station	宝山站		0.0	0.0	0	Baoshan	May 2028
	Tietong Road	铁通路					Baoshan	May 2028
	Tieshan Road	铁山路					Baoshan	May 2028
	Langang Road	兰岗路					Baoshan	May 2028
	Taihe Road	泰和路					Baoshan	May 2028
	South Jiangyang Road	江杨南路	18				Baoshan	May 2028
	East Huma Road	呼玛东路					Baoshan	May 2028
	Yierba Jinian Road	一二八纪念路					Baoshan	May 2028
	Hongwan Road	虹湾路					Hongkou	2031
	North Chezhan Road	车站北路					Hongkou	2031
	Guangling 4th Road	广灵四路	26 (planned)				Hongkou	2031
	Liangcheng Road	凉城路	20				Hongkou	2031
	Shanghai International Studies University	上海外国语大学					Hongkou	2031
	Tian'ai Road	甜爱路					Hongkou	2031
	Hailun Road	海伦路	4 10				Hongkou	2031
	Zhoujiazui Road	周家嘴路					Hongkou	2031
	Tilanqiao	提篮桥	12				Hongkou	2031
	South Pudong Road	浦东南路	2 14				Pudong	2031
	Shangcheng Road	商城路	9				Pudong	2031
	Weifang Road	潍坊路					Pudong	2031
	Tangqiao	塘桥	4				Pudong	2031
	Nanmatou Road	南码头路					Pudong	2031
	Huafeng Road	华丰路					Pudong	2031
	China Art Museum South	中华艺术宫南					Pudong	2031
	Shibo Avenue	世博大道	13				Pudong	2029
	Houtan	后滩	7				Pudong	2031
	Dezhou Road	德州路					Pudong	2029
	Oriental Sports Center	东方体育中心	6 8 11				Pudong	2029
	Lingzhao Xincun	凌兆新村	8 26 (planning)				Pudong	2029
	South Sanlin	三林南	Airport Link				Pudong	2029
	Huajing Road	华泾路	23				Xuhui	2029
	Jinghong Road	景洪路	15; Airport Link				Minhang	2029
	Liancao Road	联曹路					Minhang	2029
	Hongjian Road	虹建路			44.5		Minhang	2029
