= Zhenhua Road station =

Qingdao Metro station

Zhenhua Road 振华路
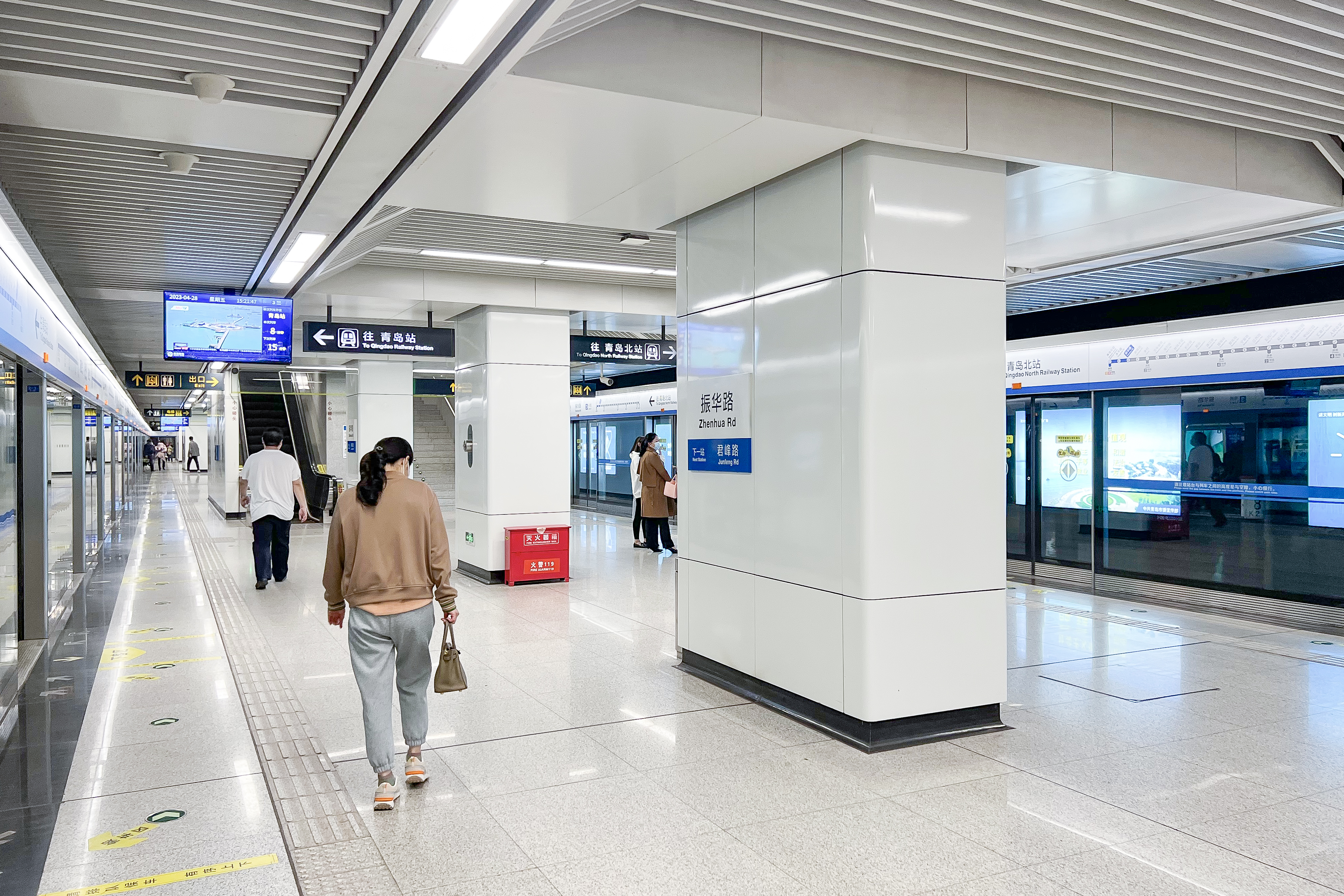

General information
- Location: Licang District, Qingdao, Shandong; China
- Coordinates: 36.16875°N 120.400694°E
- Operated by: Qingdao Metro Corporation
- Line(s): Line 3
- Platforms: 2 (1 island platform)

History
- Opened: 16 December 2015; 9 years ago

Services
| Preceding station | Qingdao Metro | Following station |
|---|---|---|
| Junfeng Road towards Qingdao Railway Station | Line 3 | Yongping Road towards Qingdao North Railway Station |

Zhenhua Road (Chinese: 振华路) is a station of the Qingdao Metro on Line 3, which opened on 16 December 2015.
