= Shanghai Metro =

Metro system in Shanghai, China

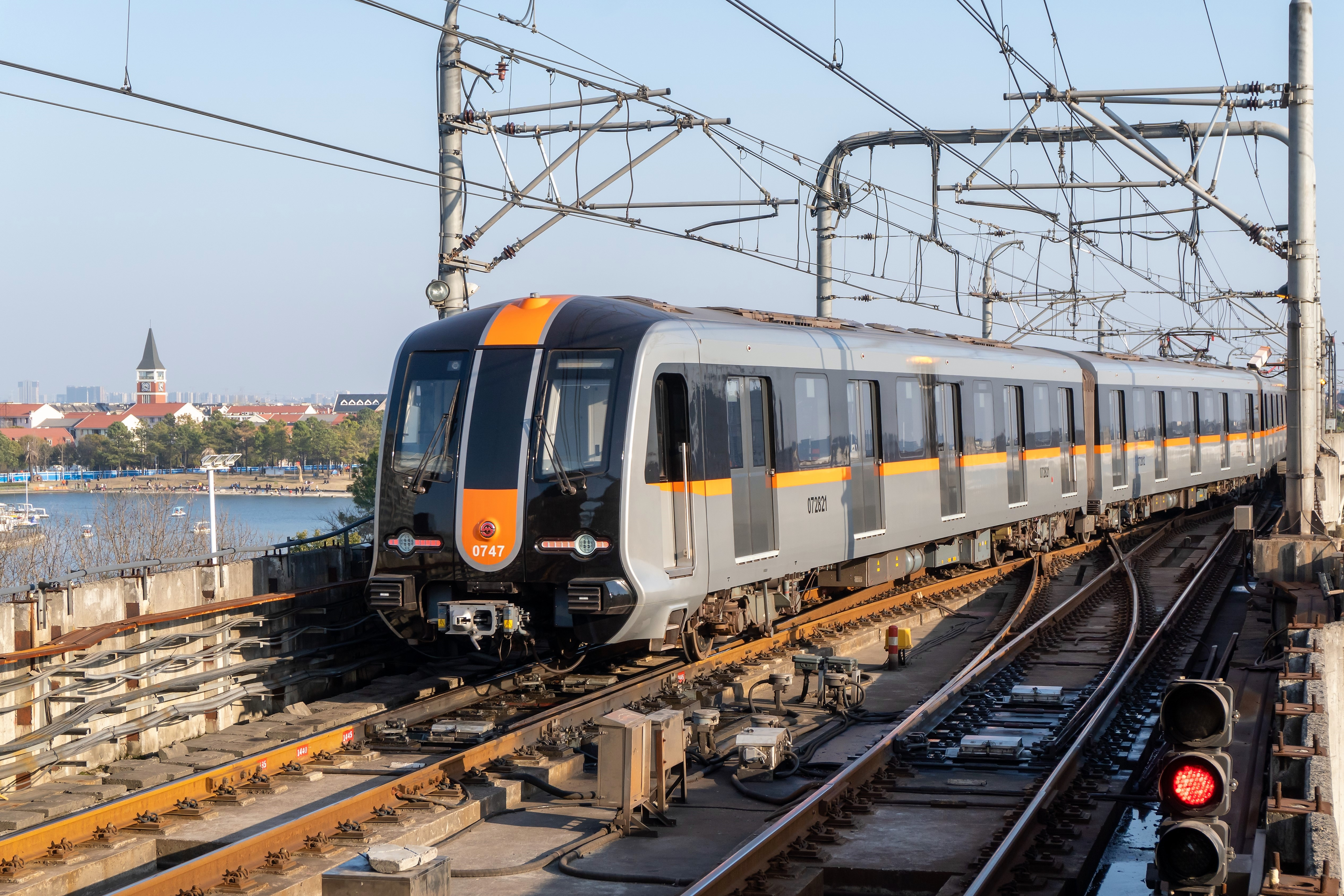
- An 07A02 train at Meilan Lake station

Overview
- Owner: Shanghai Municipal Government
- Area served: Shanghai and Kunshan, Jiangsu
- Locale: Shanghai
- Transit type: Rapid transit
- Number of lines: 19 (Note: This figure excludes the Maglev line and Jinshan railway, both often included in Shanghai Metro maps but not considered part of the system. Official reported number of lines by Shentong Metro Group includes Maglev line, resulting in 20 lines.)
- Number of stations: 508 (Note: This figure counts an interchange station separately if intersecting lines have distinct, dedicated track and platform infrastructure. Thus, the 9 stations along the Hongqiao Road-Baoshan Road segment, which are shared by lines 3 and 4 on the same tracks and platforms, are not double-counted, whereas all other interchange stations are counted once for each intersecting line, including Yishan Road, which, despite also being served by lines 3 and 4, have separate track and station infrastructure. Stations on non-Shanghai Metro systems (including Maglev line and Jinshan railway) are not included. The officially-cited number of stations by Shentong Metro Group includes Maglev line (2 stations), resulting in 508 stations. If all interchange stations are counted only once regardless of infrastructure separation, then MTA New York City Subway is the system with the largest number of unique stations, totaling 424.) (transfer stations counted repeatedly, according to number of lines serving the station); 409 (interchange stations counted once)
- Daily ridership: 10.03 million (2023 avg.); 13.39 million (record)
- Annual ridership: 3.661 billion (2023)
- Website: shmetro.com

Operation
- Began operation: May 28, 1993; 33 years ago
- Operator: Six subsidiaries (list) of Shanghai Shentong Metro Group Co. Ltd.
- Character: Grade separated
- Number of vehicles: 7,394 revenue railcars (list); 14 depots and 15 yards (list)

Technical
- System length: 816 km (507.0 mi) (Note: This figure excludes the Maglev line, both often included in Shanghai Metro maps but not considered part of the system. The figure counts the shared track (11.566 km) of lines 3 and 4 once, as Line 3 only. Official reported network length by Shentong Metro Group includes the 29km Maglev line, resulting in 831 km (516.4 mi).)
- Track gauge: 1,435 mm (4 ft 8 1/2 in) standard gauge
- Electrification: Overhead line, 1,500 V DC; Third rail, 1,500 V DC (Lines 16 & 17); Third rail, 750 V DC (Pujiang line)
- Top speed: 80 km/h (50 mph); 100 km/h (62 mph) (Lines 11 & 17); 120 km/h (75 mph) (Line 16)
System map
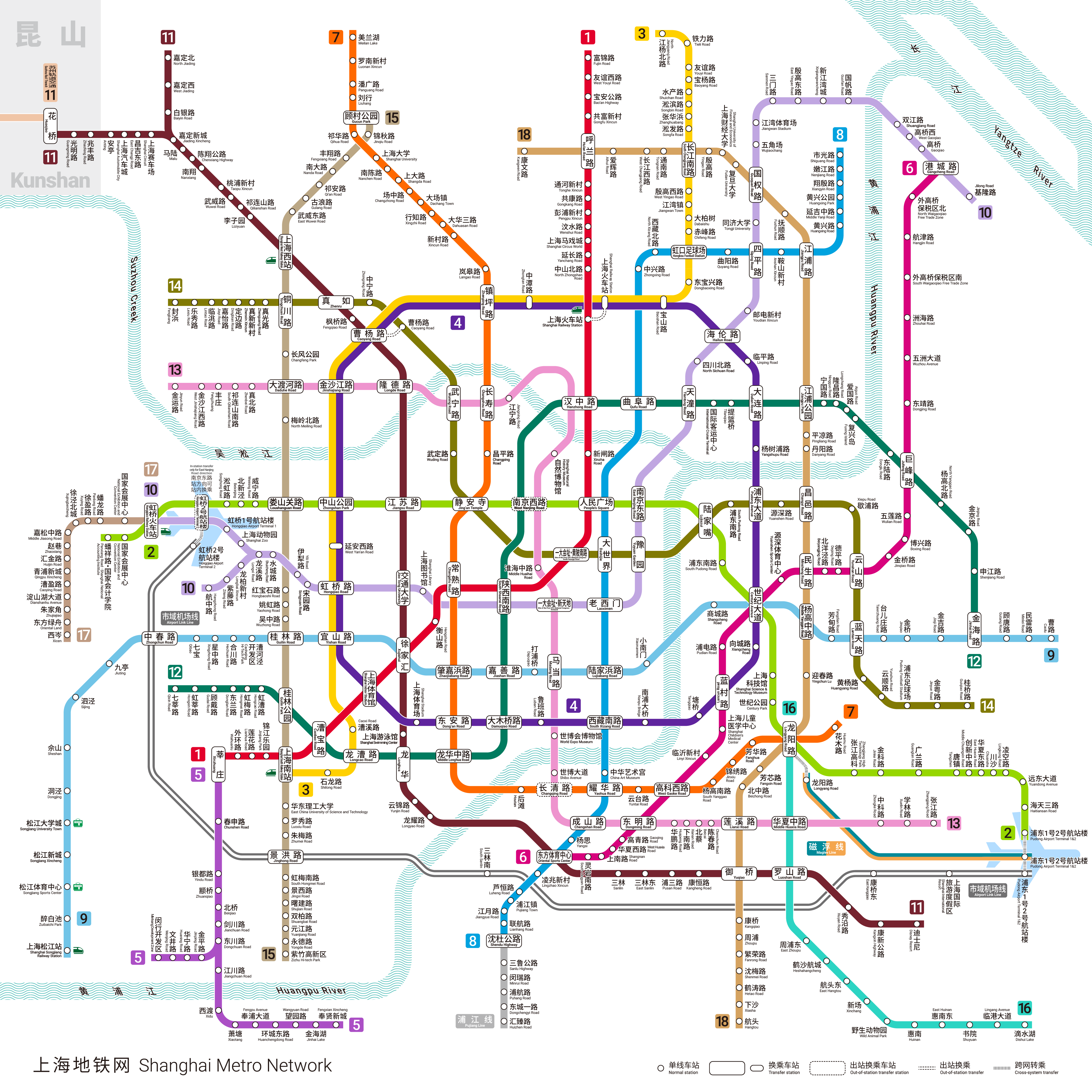
Part of a series on
Transport in Shanghai
- Roads
- Long Distance Rail
- Commuter Rail
- Maglev
- Metro
- Tram
- Trolleybus
- Bus
- Ferry
Long Distance
- Airports
  - SHA
  - PVG
- HSR
  - Huning
  - Jinghu
  - Coastal
  - Yangtze
  - Hukun
  - HuSuHu
  - HuSuTong
- Conventional Rail
  - Jinghu
  - Hukun
- Railway stations
  - Shanghai
  - Hongqiao
  - Shanghainan
  - Shanghaixi
  - Songjiang
Shanghai Suburban Railway
- Jinshan railway
- Airport Link line
Shanghai Metro
- 1 2 3 4 5 6 7 8 9 10 11 12
13 14 15 16 17 18 Pujiang
- Miscellanea
  - Trains
  - Stations
  - Timeline
Trams in Shanghai
- 1908-75
- Zhangjiang (Closed)
- Songjiang (T1
- T2)
Roads
- Municipal express roads
- Provincial expressways
- National expressways
- Yangtze River fixed crossing
Shanghai Public Transport Card

Shanghai Metro
- Simplified Chinese: 上海轨道交通
- Traditional Chinese: 上海軌道交通
- Literal meaning: Shanghai Rail Transit
Transcriptions
Standard Mandarin
- Hanyu Pinyin: Shànghǎi Guǐdào Jiāotōng
- Bopomofo: ㄕㄤˋㄏㄞˇㄍㄨㄟˇㄉㄠˋㄐㄧㄠ ㄊㄨㄥ
- Wade–Giles: Shang^{4}-hai^{3} Kui^{3}-tao^{4} Chiao^{1}-t'ung^{1}
Wu
- Romanization: Zaanhe kuedau jiau thon [zɑ̃˨hɛ˦ kuɛ˧dɔ˥ tɕiɔ˨tʰoŋ˨]

Commonly abbreviated as
- Simplified Chinese: 上海地铁
- Traditional Chinese: 上海地鐵
- Literal meaning: Shanghai Subway
Transcriptions
Standard Mandarin
- Hanyu Pinyin: Shànghǎi Dìtiě
- Bopomofo: ㄕㄤˋㄒㄞˇㄉㄧˋㄊㄧㄝˇ
Wu
- Romanization: Zånhae dithih

The Shanghai Metro (Chinese: 上海地铁; pinyin: Shànghǎi Dìtiě; Shanghainese: Zaon^{6}he^{5} Di^{6}thiq^{7}) is a rapid transit system in Shanghai, operating urban and suburban transit services to 14 of its 16 municipal districts (Note: Jinshan and Chongming districts do not have Shanghai Metro service, though a new line to Chongming is under construction as of March 2021. Meanwhile, Jinshan has been served by the China Railways-operated, non-fare-integrated Jinshan Line since September 2012.) and to the neighboring township of Huaqiao, in Kunshan, Jiangsu Province.

Forming the vast majority of the broader, multi-operator Shanghai rail transit network, the Shanghai Metro system is the world's second longest metro system by route length, totaling 808 kilometres (502 mi) and the second largest system by number of stations, with 506 stations across 19 lines (408, if stations connected by transfers are counted as single stations). It also ranks first in the world by annual ridership, with 3.88 billion rides delivered in 2019. The last daily ridership record was set on 9 March 2024, at 13.39 million rides. Ridership routinely stands at over 10 million on an average workday, accounting for 73% of trips on public transport in the city.

== History ==
Evolution of the Shanghai Metro

Opening to the public in 1993 with full-scale construction extending back to 1986, the Shanghai Metro is the third-oldest rapid transit system in mainland China, after the Beijing Subway and the Tianjin Metro. Though actual construction and inauguration of the Shanghai Metro succeeded its counterparts in Beijing and Tianjin, their initial planning would date back to the same period, during the late 50s and early 60s, before the impact of the Cultural Revolution.

The system saw its most rapid expansion during the years leading up to the 2010 World Expo, namely, between 2003 and 2010. Between 2007 and 2010, it was customary for new lines and extensions to open on an annual basis. The system is still expanding, with the most recent expansions opening in early 2024, and several new lines and extensions under construction.

=== 1950–1965: Proposals and early groundbreaking ===
The first proposal of a subway system for Shanghai dates back to 1950. Against the backdrop of the air raids of Shanghai by the retreating Nationalist forces in that year, a team of Soviet technical specialists visiting the city made a proposal to the Municipal Committee on Urban Planning and Design for a dual-purpose underground railway system, to be used for mass transit during peace times, and as shelter facility in times of war. It was later, in 1953, during confidential consultations held with Soviet urban planning specialists by Li Gancheng, the then-Deputy Chief and Party Secretary of the Municipal Construction Committee in Shanghai, that the initial concepts of a north-south line and an east-west line were pencilled on a map of the city, which would later become Line 1 and Line 2. Further consultations and public surveys on transit needs were held in 1959 by a Municipal Planning Committee for Underground Railway, in conjunction with the Municipal Public Utilities Management Bureau, and identified multiple alternative plans for a subway system.

In 1960, with a newly-formed a Bureau of Tunnel Engineering, the city undertook an experimental shield tunneling project in Tangqiao, Pudong, excavating a tunnel with a 4.2m-diameter shield for over 100 meters. Dubbed Project 60, this project was carried out in strict confidentiality. In August 1964, the Tunnel Engineering section of the Municipal Urban Construction Bureau completed the route selection phase for the north-south line (later Line 1), which was eventually to connect key locations in the downtown core, including the Shanghai Cultural Square, People's Square and the then Shanghai North railway station, with the rapidly industrializing and urbanizing northern districts of Zhabei and Baoshan, including the industrial zone in Pengpu, the worker's residential area in Zhangmiao, and the town of Wusong. It is ostensibly in this same period that, in 1965, another experimental project on underground tunnel and station construction was underway in a segment between Hengshan Park and Xiangyang Park, both in Xuhui. However, construction halted during the immediately subsequent Cultural Revolution period, and no systematic plan to build an underground railway system materialized.

=== The 1980s: Renewed plans and initial construction of Line 1 ===
The economic reforms of 1980s and the rapidly increasing demand for efficient urban public transit saw a swift resurrection of plans for a rapid rail transit system in Shanghai. In 1983, a jointly-published "Proposal on the Construction of a North-South Rapid Rail Transit Line" by the Municipal Planning Committee, the Municipal Construction Committee, in collaboration with the Municipal Bureaus of Urban Planning, of Public Infrastructure, of Railways and of Public Works, called for a rail transit line to be built which connects the city center with Minhang and Jinshan in the south-southwest, and with Wusong and Baoshan in the north-northeast, clearly echoing the initial north-south line concept of the 1950s-60s, though couched in this period in terms of the City's new master plan to "develop both the north and the south wings." Subsequently, in August 1985, a Project Planning Report submitted to the Municipal Planning Committee and the Municipal Committee on Urban and Rural Construction and Management by the Preparation Working Group on the North–South Rapid Rail Transit Line prioritizes the Xinlonghua-to-New railway station segment, and makes a conclusive case for the route of the previously-indeterminate middle segment of the line to be placed under Huaihai Road. Thus, the first stage of the first underground railway line, later Line 1, was determined.

Formal central government-level approval of both the construction of Line 1 and a long-term system-wide plan for the Shanghai Metro came in 1986. In that year, the State Council approved the Master City Plan of Shanghai (1983–2000), the first-ever such approval by the State Council in the history of Shanghai. Part of that Master Plan included a 40-year phased program that would eventually see the construction of 11 metro lines covering over 325 km by 2025. On August 14, 1986, the State Council approved the "Proposal Concerning Construction of Shanghai City Subway Line from Xinlonghua Station to Shanghai Railway Station," clearing the pathway for the beginning of construction of Line 1.

=== 1993–2002: Inauguration and initial expansion ===
The southern section of line 1 (four stations) opened on May 28, 1993. The full line (including middle and northern sections) eventually opened on April 10, 1995, and in the first year, it handled an average of 600,000 passengers daily. The first phase of line 2 was inaugurated in June 2000, which in 2010 linked Hongqiao International Airport (SHA) and Pudong International Airport (PVG). The 25 km Pearl line (line 3) opened for revenue service in 2001. Line 5 opened in 2003. Line 4 joined the network in January 2006 and became a circular line in 2007.

The Master Plan of Shanghai Metro-Region 1999–2020 was approved by the State Council of China on May 11, 2001. The plan had 17 lines in total, containing four intra-city-region express rail lines, eight urban metro lines, and five urban light-rail lines with a total length of about 780 kilometers. The total length of the planned MRT network in the central city will add up to 488 kilometers. In addition, Shanghai will strengthen the development of the suburban rail transport network so that it can link to and coordinate with state rail lines, metro lines, and light railways. One or two rail transport lines are planned between every new city and the central city.

=== 2003–2010: Rapid expansion for the Expo 2010 ===
In 2003, when there were only three lines with a total length of 65 kilometers (with a further five lines already under construction), Shanghai was named host city for the World Expo 2010; plans were made to extend the length of the Metro to 400 kilometers by the time it opened in 2010. Thereby it completed the initial 40-year plan 15 years ahead of schedule. By the time of Expo 2010 the metro system consisted of 11 lines, 407 km, and 277 stations.

=== 2011–2021: Completion of a master plan ===
In 2009, Shanghai announced it would have 21 lines operating by 2020 with lines extending further into the suburban areas. At the end of 2021 (expected), most of the lines of the plan were opened (with an exemption of line 20, Jiamin line, and Chongming line) leading to 19 lines (lines 1–18 and Pujiang), 802 km, 516 stations.

On October 16, 2013, with the extension of line 11 into Kunshan in Jiangsu province (about 6.5 km), Shanghai Metro became the first rapid transit system in China to provide cross-provincial service and the second intercity metro after the Guangfo Metro.

=== 2021 onwards: Phase III construction ===
The National Development and Reform Commission has approved the 2018–2023 construction plan for the city's Metro network. The construction of five new metro lines (and two commuter rail lines) and two extensions to opened lines are expected to take five to six years and are planned to start construction before 2023. After completion, there will be 27 metro and commuter rail lines covering 1,154 kilometers.

With the 2017-2035 Shanghai Master Plan, more emphasis was put on other rail transit modes. The plan calls for a comprehensive transportation system that consists of multimodel rail transit. Intercity lines (intercity railway, municipality railway, and express railway), urban lines (subway and light rail), and local lines (modern tramcar, rubber-tired transit system) are included in the plan, with a length of more than 1,000 km each.

By 2035, public transportation will account for over 50% of all means of transportation, and 60% of rail transit stations in the inner areas of the main city will have 600m of land coverage. According to the NDRC, the Shanghai Metro network (including commuter rail) will cover 1,642 kilometers in total by 2030 and more than 2,000 kilometers by 2035.

== Ridership ==
Since 1993, the ridership of the entire network has grown steadily (except during Covid-19 in 2020 and 2022) as new lines or sections come into operation. In 1995, the first year of operation, line 1 carried 62 million passengers (average daily passenger volume of 223,000). Ridership increased between 2011 and 2016 with 10% per annum, between 2017 and 2019 with 5%. Ridership recovered to close to pre-covid levels in 2021, with a ridership on December 31 of 13.014 million.

Average daily ridership
Year	(in millions)
2003	1.252
2004	1.452(+16%)
2005	1.627(+23.8%)
2006	1.797(+10.4%)
2007	2.230(+24.1%)
2008	3.082(+38.2%)
2009	3.611(+17.2%)
2010	5.162(+43.0%)
2011	5.75(+11.6%)
2012	6.219(+8.0%)
2014	6.866(+10.4%)
2014	7.745(+12.8%)
2015	8.405(+8.5%)
2016	9.292(+10.6%)
2017	9.693(+4.3%)
2018	10.164(+4.9%)
2019	10.641(+4.7%)
2020	7.746(-27.2%)
2021	9.780(+26.3%)
2022	6.436(-34.2%)
2023	10.023(+55.9%)
2024	10.281(+2.6%)

Peak passenger numbers over time (thousands) (Note: A "*" indicates single line record high.)
	September 25, 2015	December 31, 2015	April 1, 2016 (Note: Tomb-Sweeping Day.)	March 3, 2017	March 17, 2017	April 28, 2017	March 9, 2018 (Note: Women's Day leisure shopping. More travel as most organizations give female employees half-day off and shopping malls have discounts on this day.)	March 14, 2018	March 8, 2019	March 8, 2024
Total ridership	10,343	10,830	11,299	11,559	11,792	11,867	12,231	12,306	13,294	13,397
Transfers	4,340	4,435		4,886	4.977			5,240	5,240	5,931
Line 1	1,370	1,410	1,420	1,370	1,410	1,430	1,410	1,410	1,507*	1,280
Line 2	1,770	1,750	1,770	1,770	1,830	1,850	1,820	1,860	1,903	1,458
Line 3	610	600	640	610	630	640	610	610	621	469
Line 4	940	890	950	940	950	950	950	960	976*	763
Line 5	160	170	180	170	170	170	160	160	221*	208
Line 6	440	450*	470	490	500*	490	480	480	520*	472
Line 7	850	800	890	920*	920	900	950	960*	958	782
Line 8	1,080	1,080	1,080	1,110	1,120*	1,120	1,160*	1,150	1,221*	1,100
Line 9	940	970*	970	1,010*	1,020*	1,020	1,150*	1,150*	1,228*	1,243
Line 10	860	860	880	910	940	960	990*	1,000*	1,067*	1,007
Line 11	740	800*	860	920*	940*	960	960	950	1,012*	1,056*
Line 12	220	540*	620	700	710	710	740	740	826*	844*
Line 13	200	340	370	450*	450*	430	490*	500*	710*	712
Line 14		18	43							505*
Line 15										418*
Line 16	160	180	190	210	220	230	230	230	254	252
Line 17							120	120	175*	234
Line 18										555*
Pujiang	0	4	4	4	2	1	4	4	36*	38

== Lines ==
=== In service ===
There are currently 19 lines in operation, with lines and services denoted numerically as well as by characteristic colors, which are used as a visual aid for better distinction on station signage and on the exterior of trains, in the form of a colored block or belt.

Most tracks in the Shanghai Metro system are served by a single service; thus "Line X" usually refers to both the physical line and its service. The only exception is the segment shared by lines 3 and 4, between Hongqiao Road station and Baoshan Road station, where both services use the same tracks and platforms.

Map of the current network

Line	Termini (District)		Commencement	Latest extension	Length	Stations
Line 1 (Shanghai Metro)	Fujin Road (Baoshan)	Xinzhuang (Minhang)	May 28, 1993	December 29, 2007	36.4 km (22.62 mi)	28
Line 2 (Shanghai Metro)	Panxiang Road · Shanghai National Accounting Institute (Qingpu)	Pudong Airport Terminal 1&2 (Pudong)	September 20, 1999	November 1, 2025	63.8 km (39.64 mi)	31
Line 3 (Shanghai Metro)	North Jiangyang Road (Baoshan)	Shanghai South Railway Station (Xuhui)	December 26, 2000	December 18, 2006	40.3 km (25.04 mi)	29 (Note: Lines 3 and 4 share the same track between Hongqiao Road and Baoshan Road (9 stations). These are not counted twice in the total number of stations.)
Line 4 (Shanghai Metro)	Loop line		December 31, 2005	December 29, 2007	33.7 km (20.94 mi) (Note: Lines 3 and 4 share the same track between Hongqiao Road and Baoshan Road. In case these track are not counted the length of line 4 is 22.03km.)	26
Line 5 (Shanghai Metro)	Xinzhuang (Minhang)	Minhang Development Zone (Minhang) Fengxian Xincheng (Fengxian)	November 25, 2003	December 30, 2018	32.7 km (20.32 mi)	19
Line 6 (Shanghai Metro)	Gangcheng Road (Pudong)	Oriental Sports Center (Pudong)	December 19, 2007	April 12, 2011	32.3 km (20.07 mi)	28
Line 7 (Shanghai Metro)	Meilan Lake (Baoshan)	Huamu Road (Pudong)	December 5, 2009	December 28, 2010	44.2 km (27.46 mi)	33
Line 8 (Shanghai Metro)	Shiguang Road (Yangpu)	Shendu Highway (Minhang)	December 29, 2007	July 5, 2009	37.4 km (23.24 mi)	30
Line 9 (Shanghai Metro)	Shanghai Songjiang Railway Station (Songjiang)	Caolu (Pudong)	December 29, 2007	December 30, 2017	65.6 km (40.76 mi)	35
Line 10 (Shanghai Metro)	Jilong Road (Pudong)	Hongqiao Railway Station (Minhang) Hangzhong Road (Minhang)	April 10, 2010	December 26, 2020	44.9 km (27.90 mi)	37
Line 11 (Shanghai Metro)	North Jiading (Jiading) Huaqiao (Kunshan, Jiangsu)	Disney Resort (Pudong)	December 31, 2009	April 26, 2016	82.4 km (51.20 mi)	40
Line 12 (Shanghai Metro)	Qixin Road (Minhang)	Jinhai Road (Pudong)	December 29, 2013	December 19, 2015	40.4 km (25.10 mi)	32
Line 13 (Shanghai Metro)	Zhangjiang Road (Pudong)	Jinyun Road (Jiading)	December 30, 2012	December 30, 2018	38.8 km (24.11 mi)	31
Line 14 (Shanghai Metro)	Fengbang (Jiading)	Guiqiao Road (Pudong)	December 30, 2021	—N/a	38.5 km (23.92 mi)	30
Line 15 (Shanghai Metro)	Gucun Park (Baoshan)	Zizhu Hi-tech Park (Minhang)	January 23, 2021	—N/a	42.3 km (26.28 mi)	30
Line 16 (Shanghai Metro)	Longyang Road (Pudong)	Dishui Lake (Pudong)	December 29, 2013	December 28, 2014	59.0 km (36.66 mi)	13
Line 17 (Shanghai Metro)	Hongqiao Railway Station (Minhang)	Xicen (Qingpu)	December 30, 2017	November 30, 2024	41.6 km (25.85 mi)	14
Line 18 (Shanghai Metro)	Kangwen Road (Baoshan)	Hangtou (Pudong)	December 26, 2020	December 27, 2025	44.6 km (27.71 mi)	31
	Shendu Highway (Minhang)	Huizhen Road (Minhang)	March 31, 2018	—N/a	6.7 km (4.16 mi)	6
Total					816 km	513

=== Future expansion ===
The Shanghai Metro system is one of the fastest-growing metro systems in the world. Ambitious expansion plans call for 25 lines with over 1,000 km (620 mi) of length by 2025. By then, every location in the central area of Shanghai will be within 600 m (2,000 ft) of a subway station. Shanghai metro is connected with the Suzhou Metro; the Suzhou Metro Line 11 connects with the Shanghai Metro Line 11 at Huaqiao.

Network map of scheduled network as of the latest approval.

Planned opening date	Line	Name	Terminals		Length	Stations	Status	Ref.
2026	22	Phase I	Jinji Road	Yu'an	42.8 km (26.59 mi)	8	Under construction	
2027	13	Western extension	Jinyun Road	National Exhibition and Convention Center	9.8 km (6.09 mi)	5	Under construction	
2027	13	Eastern extension	Zhangjiang Road	Dangui Road	4.1 km (2.55 mi)	2	Under construction	
2027	18	Infill station	South Jiangyang Road		—N/a	1	Pending, expected to open with Line 19 North section	
2027	21	Phase I and east extension	Dongjing Road	Shanghai East railway station	42 km (26.10 mi)	22	Under construction	
2028	12	Western extension	Qixin Road	Dongjing	17.2 km (10.69 mi)	6	Under construction	
2028	15	Southern extension	Zizhu Hi-tech Park	Wangyuan Road	11.4 km (7.08 mi)	4	Under construction	
2028	19	North section	Baoshan Railway Station	Yierba Jinian Road	9.2 km (5.72 mi)	8	Under construction	
2028	21	East extension remaining section	Shanghai East railway station	Pudong Airport Terminal 3	2 km (1.24 mi)	1	Under construction	
2028	23	Phase I	Shanghai Stadium	Minhang Development Zone	28 km (17.40 mi)	22	Under construction	
2029	19	South section	Shibo Avenue	Hongjian Road	15.6 km (9.69 mi)	9	Under construction	
2029	20	Phase I west section	Jiaotong Road	Shanghai Circus World	7.2 km (4.47 mi)	7	Under construction	
2031	19	Middle section	Yierba Jinian Road	Shibo Avenue	21.1 km (13.11 mi)	17	Under construction	
2031	20	Phase I east section and east extension	Shanghai Circus World	North Xinyuan Road	21.1 km (13.11 mi)	14	Under construction	
TBA	2	Southern extension	Pudong Airport Terminal 1&2	Pudong Airport Terminal 3	4 km (2.49 mi)	1	Long-term planning	
TBA	5	Southern extension reserve	Fengxian Xincheng	Pingzhuang Highway	3.5 km (2.17 mi)	1	Phase 2 reserved station	
TBA	9	Eastern extension remaining section	Caolu	Caolu Railway Station	3 km (1.86 mi)	1	Construction deferred, requires re-approval	
TBA	14	Infill station	Longju Road		—N/a	1	Pending	
					239 km (148.51 mi)	131		

== Infrastructure ==
=== Rolling stock ===
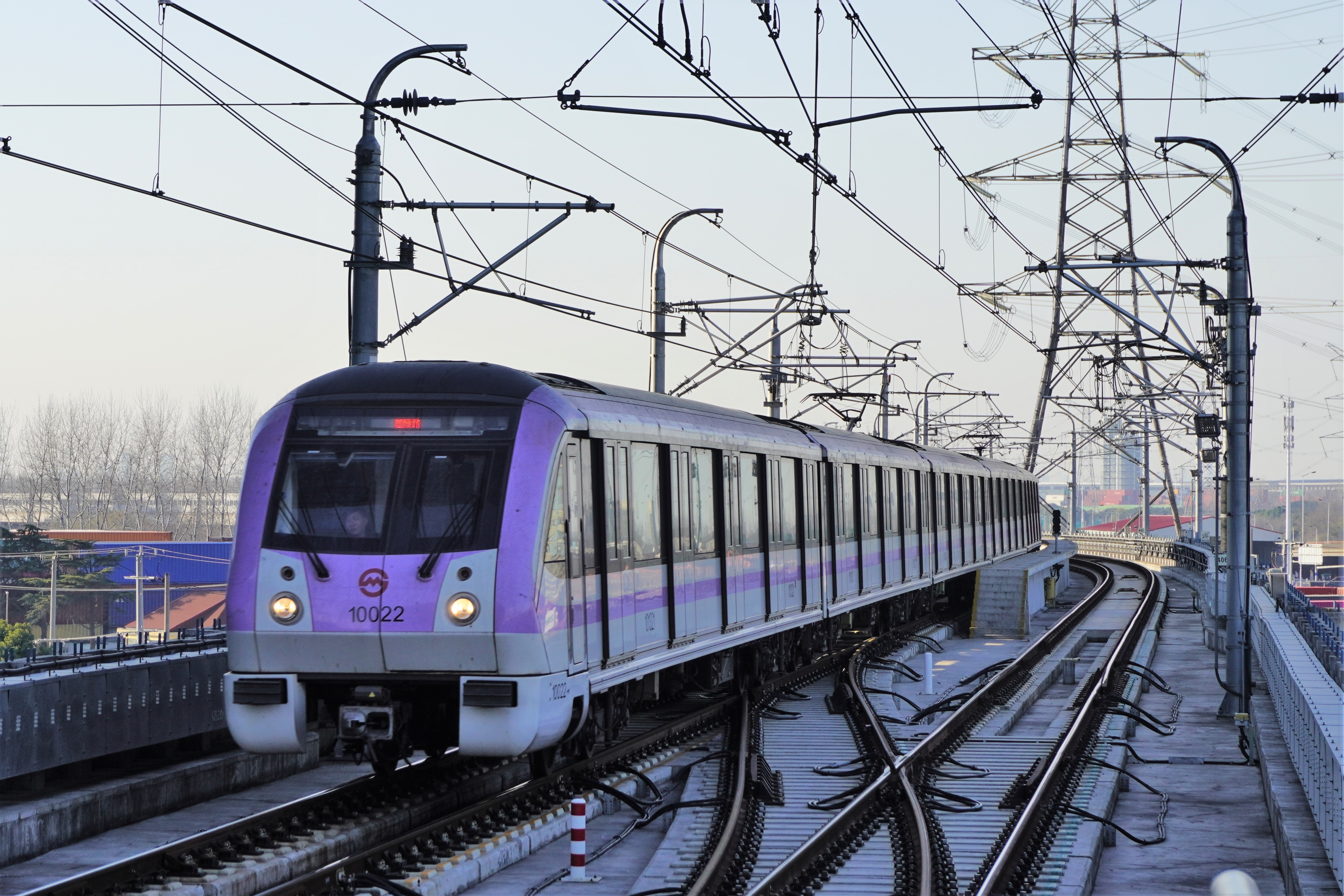
An 10A01 train at Jilong Road station

There are currently over 7,000 cars in the Shanghai Metro fleet. The fleet reached 1,000 cars in 2007, 2,000 cars in 2012, and 3,000 cars in 2016, the 4,000th car was delivered on December 17, 2016, the 5,000th car was delivered on July 20, 2018. The 7,000th car was delivered on December 25, 2020.

Number of revenue cars in the Shanghai Metro
Year	2007	2012	2016	December 17, 2016	July 20, 2018	May 28, 2020	December 28, 2020
Number of cars	1,000	2,000	3,000	4,000	5,000	6,000	7,000
Average daily ridership (million)	2.23	6.219	9.292	9.292	10.164	7.746	7.746
Average no. of daily ridership per railcar	2,230	3,110	3,097	2,323	2,033	1,291	1,107

Most lines currently use semi-automatic train operations (STO/GoA2). Starting and stopping are automated, but a driver operates the doors, drives the train if needed and handles emergencies. The exceptions being:

- Lines 2, 5 and 17: Driverless train operations (DTO/GoA3) train attendant operates the doors and drives the train in case of emergencies.
- Lines 10, 14, 15, 18 and Pujiang line: Unattended train operations (UTO/GoA4) starting and stopping, operation of doors are all fully automated without any on-train staff. With a total length of 169 km it is the world's 2nd largest fully automated metro system, after the Singapore MRT.

Most lines currently use 6 car sets, with the exceptions being:

- The Minhang Developing Zone branch of line 5, line 6 and Pujiang line, which uses 4 car sets.
- Most trains on line 8 use 7 car sets.
- Lines 1, 2 and 14 use 8 car sets.

On most lines the maximum operating speed is 80 km/h (50 mph), with the exceptions being:

- Lines 11 and 17 the maximum operating speed is 100 km/h (62 mph).
- Line 16 the maximum operating speed is 120 km/h (75 mph).

Pujiang line is the only line using cars with rubber tires running on concrete tracks.

All subway cars have air-conditioning. During summer of 2021 the subway's first and last carriages on Metro lines 3-5, 10-13, and 15-18 will be 2 degrees Celsius warmer than the other carriages, the air-conditioning is adjustable for different carriages on these lines. The measure aims to address the needs of some passengers who find the trains "too cold," especially the elderly and children.

=== Platform screen doors ===
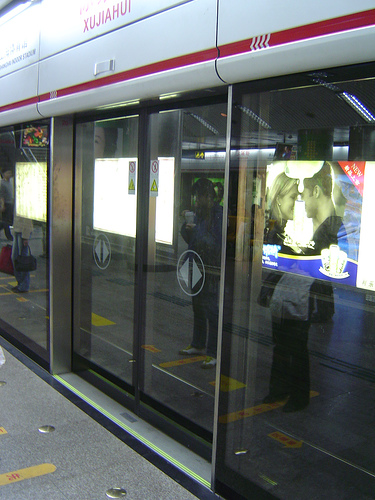
Platform screen doors installed at Xujiahui station on line 1

Almost all stations have (full height) platform screen doors with sliding acrylic glass at the platform edge. Only half height doors called automatic platform gates are placed at most of the elevated sections and the section of line 2 from Songhong Road to Longyang Road. The train stops with its doors lined-up with the sliding doors on the platform edge and open when the train doors open, and are closed at all other times.

Platform Edge Doors were not initially introduced on stations of earlier lines due to budget concerns, as such doors could not be sourced domestically. That being said, the stations were provisioned to install Platform Edge Doors in the future. In the early 2000s, before the screen doors were installed, the annual suicide rate on the Shanghai subway system averaged about eight. In 2003, Shanghai Metro Operation Technology Development Co., Ltd. developed domestic platform screen doors which are 40% of the cost of imported platform screen doors (they cost over 6 million RMB each to install). Shanghai Circus World, opened December 28, 2004, was the first station to have installed platform screen doors. To help cope with passenger handling, platform safety doors were built for line 4 onwards (Note: Note: line 5 was constructed before line 4 and had to retrofit platform screen doors after having opened.) and a program for retrofitting older lines was put in place. The retrofitting on existing lines started in November 2005 with line 1 (first station was Xujiahui) whose core stations had doors by the end of 2006. Originally, platform screen doors were adopted to prevent cool or hot air from leaving the station to reduce electricity usage.

=== Renewable energy ===
Shanghai metro started building solar plants from 2013 and the process has been accelerated since 2019, with plans to build rooftop solar plants with a total electricity generation capacity of 30 to 50 megawatts between 2021 and 2025. In 2021, through its subsidiary (Shanghai Metro New Energy Co., Ltd.), Shanghai metro owned ten rooftop solar plants on depots and parking lots (Chuanyanghe, Zhibei, Jinqiao, Longyang Road, Sanlin, Fujin Road, Zhongchun Road, Beizhai Road, Chentai Road and Pujiang Town) generating an average annual power generation of about 23 million kWh. Annual electricity consumption of Shanghai Metro exceeds 2.5 billion kWh.

== Stations ==
There is cellular phone network coverage across the network. In 2020, all stations provided 5G network coverage. Free WiFi is also provided. There are toilets for passengers in more than 90% metro stations in Shanghai. The system is 100% wheelchair accessible, with elevators at all stations.

=== Safety ===
Riders are subject to searches of their persons and belongings at all stations by security inspectors using metal detectors and X-ray machines. Items banned from public transportation such as "guns, ammunition, knives, explosives, flammable and radioactive materials, and toxic chemicals" are subject to confiscation.

Stations are equipped with closed-circuit television. Police use it to arrest pickpockets caught on CCTV, for example.

Smoking is strictly prohibited in the metro premises. Bicycles (including folding bikes) and pets (including cats, dogs etc.) are not allowed in stations. The use of skateboards, roller skates and other equipment is not allowed in stations and carriages.

Since April 1, 2020, there is a national ban on "Uncivilized Behavior" on China's Subways, which also includes conduct rules cracking down on bad subway etiquette, such as stepping on seats, lying down on a bench or floor and playing music or videos out loud. It also bans eating and drinking on subway cars nationwide, with exceptions for infants and people with certain medical conditions.

AEDs (automatic external defibrillator) were first installed at Metro stations in 2015, with all metro stations having AEDs by the end of 2021.

=== Passenger information systems ===
Plasma screens on the platforms show passengers when the next two trains are coming, along with advertisements and public service announcements. The subway cars contain LCD screens showing advertisements and on some lines, the next stop, while above-ground trains have LED screens showing the next stop. The LED screens are being phased in on line 1 and are also included in lines 7 and 9, two underground lines.

Station signs are in Simplified Chinese and English. There are recorded messages stating the next stop in Mandarin, English, and (on lines 16 and 17 only) Shanghainese, but the messages stating nearby attractions or shops for a given station (a form of paid advertising) are in Mandarin only. The metro operating company is resistant to expanding use of Shanghainese for announcing stops, on the basis that, on most lines, the majority of passengers can understand either Mandarin or English.

The Metro authority has tested a new systematic numbering system for stations on line 10, but did not extend it to other lines.

On December 31, 2009, Shanghai launched a website displaying real-time comprehensive passenger flow information. Each station and line is displayed as green (normal operation), yellow (crowded), or red (suspended or not in operation).

== Operations ==
=== Short turn service patterns ===
Short turn service patterns exist on all lines except line 16. Partial services serve only a (usually busier) sub-segment of the entire physical line.

Line 11, one of the three branch lines of the metro system, operates a different short turn service pattern. Trains traveling to and from the branch line terminate at Huaqiao Station and Sanlin respectively. Hence, a passenger who wants to travel from the terminus of the branch to Disney Resort, the eastern terminus of the line, must change trains.

=== Express services ===
Line 16, unlike the rest of the system, is built with passing loops and operates express and rapid services. The service was postponed on January 30, 2014, due to lack of available trains, but resumed on March 21, 2016.

=== Operating hours and train intervals ===
The operating hours for most Shanghai metro stations starts between 5:00 to 6:00 in the morning and ends between 22:30 to 23:00 CST. The current timetable is available on the Shanghai metro website.

The interval of trains during peak hours differ between 1 minute and 50 seconds on line 9 and 6 minutes on line 18. Lines in the inner sections have train intervals under three minutes during morning peak hours and under 3 minutes and 45 seconds during evening peak hour. In the more suburban outer sections, train intervals are longer outside peak hours.

Headways by line
Line		1	2	3	4	5	6	7	8	9	10	11	12	13	14	15	16	17	18	Pujiang
Inner sections	Morning peak	2'30	2'30	5'00	3'10	2'30	2'00	1'55	2'00	1'50	2'30	2'00	2'30	2'30	3'20	3'40	3'30	3'30	3'00
Inner sections	Mid-day	4'00	4'00	7'00	8'00	4'30	4'30	5'30	4'20	5'30	4'00	6'00	6'00	6'00	6'00	8'00	7'00	10'00	7'00
Inner sections	Evening peak	3'00	3'00	5'00	5'00	3'00	2'30	2'44	2'45	2'30	3'00	3'00	3'45	3'00	4'00	4'30	4'00	4'00	3'30
Inner sections	Weekend daytime	4'00	3'40	4'00	6'30	4'00	3'20	5'00	3'40	5'00	3'45	5'00	6'00	5'00	5'00	6'00	5'00	7'00	6'30
Inner sections	Other hours	4'00-	5'00-	6'30-	5'00-	7'30-	5'00-	5'00-	5'00-	6'00-	5'00-	6'00-	6'00-	6'00-	5'00-	5'00-	5'00-	8'00-	6'30-
Inner sections	Other hours	12'00	11'00	10'00	12'00	10'00	10'00	8'00	6'00	10'00	8'00	8'00	10'00	10'00	12'00	13'00	10'00	10'00	12'00
Inner sections	Notes			(Note: Morning peak southwards: between 2'30 and 5'00; northwards: between 5'00 and 7'30.)	(Note: Morning peak interval between 3'10 and 7'30.)			(Note: Morning peak northwards toward Baoshan: 2'30; Evening peak southeast towards Pudong: 4'40.)	(Note: Morning peak southwards towards Oriental Sports Center 2'15.)	(Note: Morning peak east towards Songjiang 2'30; Evening peak west towards Pudong: 3'00.)	(Note: Morning peak northwards towards Baoshan/Pudong: 3'00.)	(Note: Morning peak northwest towards Jiading: 2'30; Evening peak southeast towards Pudong: 3'30.)			(Note: Morning peak eastwards towards Lantian Road between 3'00 and 3'20.)			Last updated: July 2023.
Outer sections (max interval)	Morning peak	2'30	4'00	10'00		7'30	4'00	4'00	3'30	5'30	9'00	10'00	5'00	5'00	6'40	7'20		7'00	6'00	3'20
Outer sections (max interval)	Mid-day	6'00	8'00	14'00		9'00	9'00	11'00	8'00	5'30	12'00	12'00	6'00	6'00	12'00	12'00		10'00	7'00	6'30
Outer sections (max interval)	Evening peak	3'00	6'00	10'00		9'00	3'45	6'55	5'30	5'00	9'00	7'00	7'30	5'00	8'00	9'00		8'00	7'00	3'50
Outer sections (max interval)	Weekend daytime	4'00	7'20	13'00		8'00	10'00	10'00	7'20	5'00	10'00	10'00	6'00	5'00	10'00	12'00		7'00	6'30	6'00
Outer sections (max interval)	Other hours	4'00-	5'00-	13'00-		7'30-	10'00-	10'00-	10'00-	6'00-	6'00-	11'00-	6'00-	6'00-	5'00-	5'00-		8'00-	6'30-	9'00
Outer sections (max interval)	Other hours	12'00	11'00	17'00		10'00	12'00	11'00	12'00	10'00	14'00	18'00	10'00	10'00	12'00	13'00		10'00	12'00

==== Extended hours on Friday and Saturday ====
On lines in the city center on Fridays and Saturdays, operating hours are extended by an additional hour. From April 1, 2017, the operating hours of lines 1, 2, and 7-10 were extended by an hour after the regular last train on each Friday, Saturday and the last working days before Chinese Public Holidays. Since July 1, 2017, this extension was given to lines 1-4 and 5-13. By the end of 2018, all the stations in the city center extended their operating hours to midnight on Fridays and Saturdays. Since September 30, 2020, extended operation was resumed on lines 1, 2, 9 and 10. Since April 30, 2021, extended weekend operation of lines 7 and 13 was also resumed.

==== Extra trains from Hongqiao railway station ====
From Sunday to Thursday, there are two trains on both line 2 and 10 taking passengers from Hongqiao railway station and airport after normal operation time and only stop at selected stations.

== Fares and ticket system ==
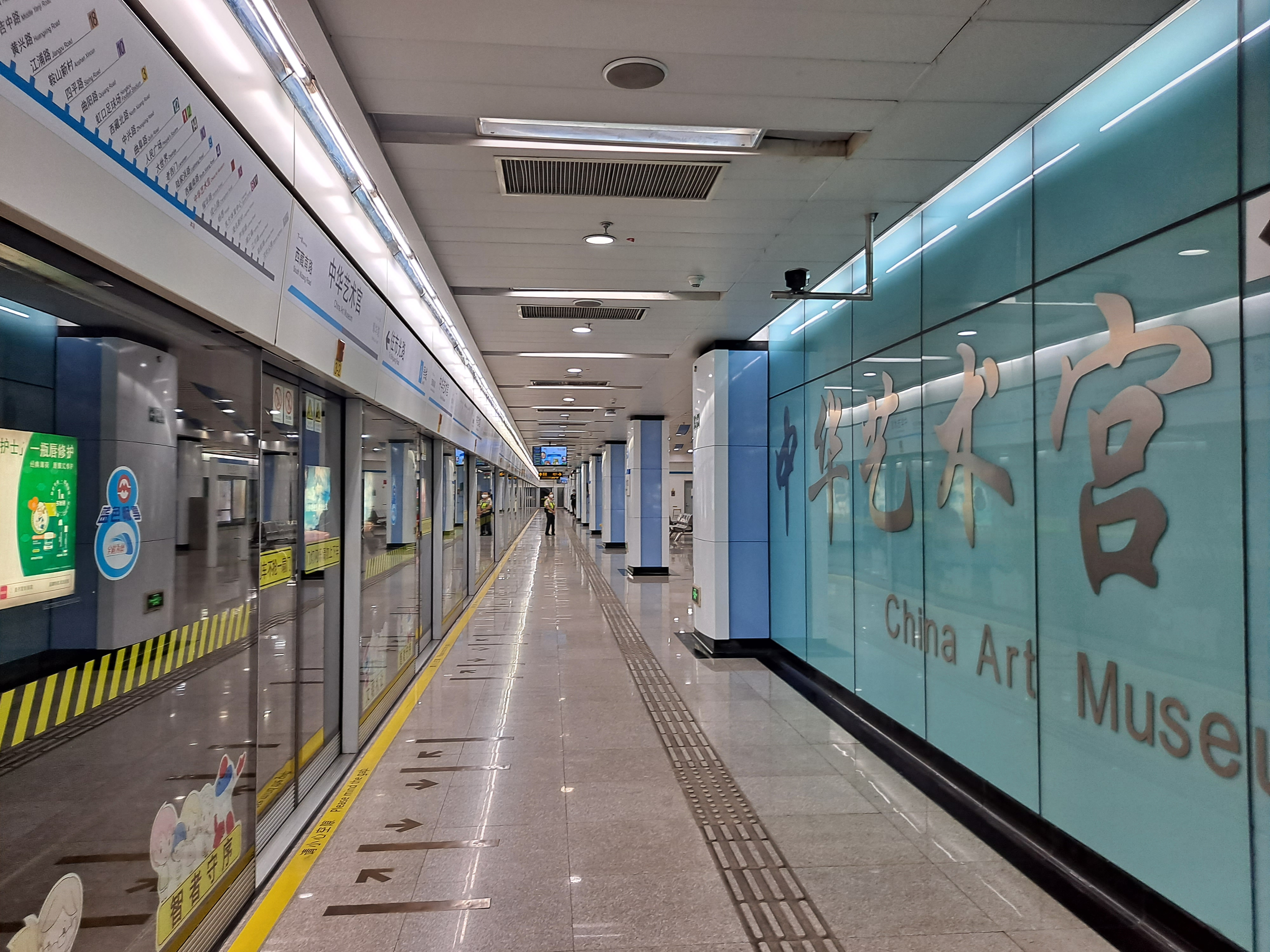
China Art Museum station

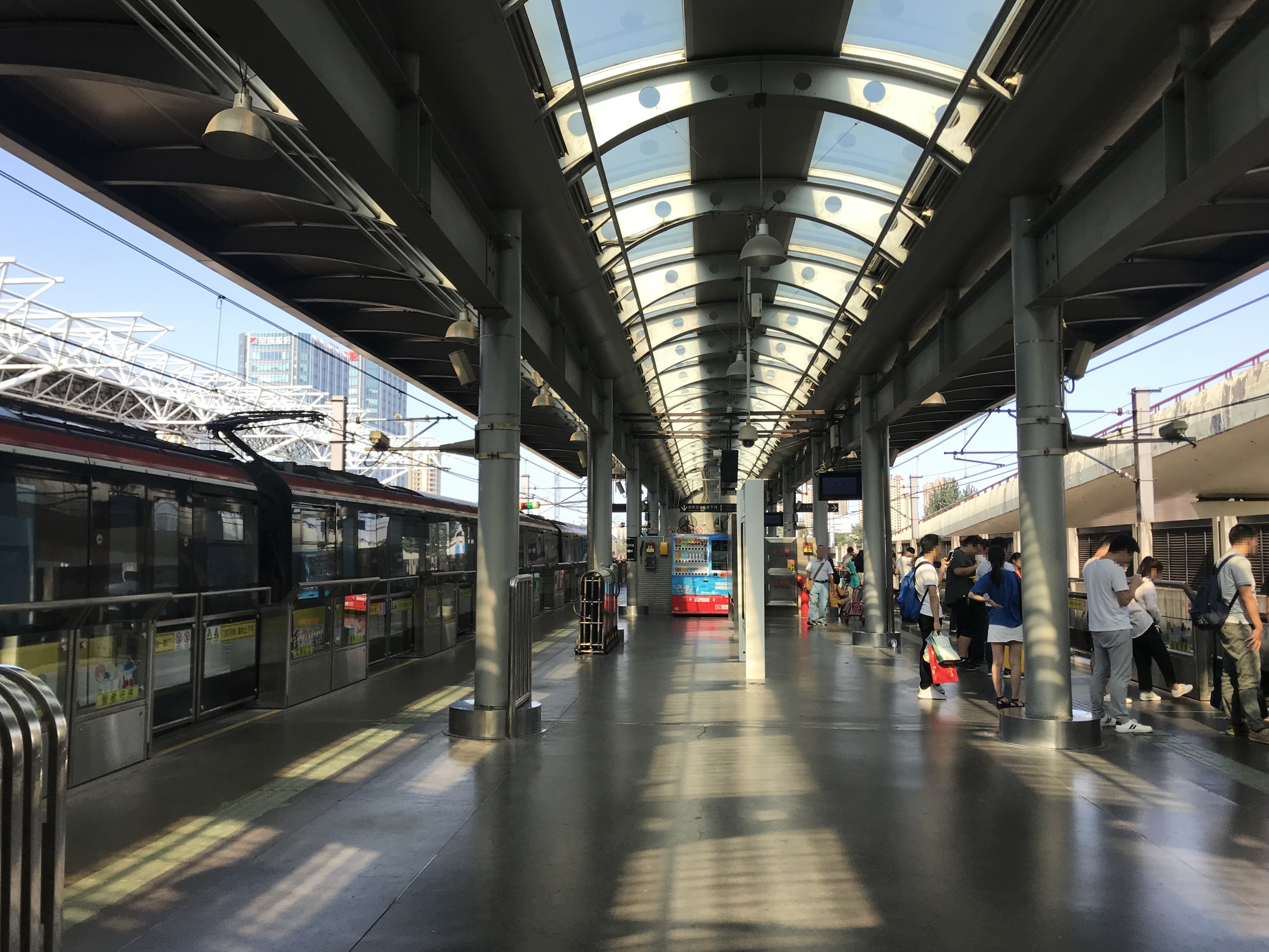
Platform of line 3 at Shanghai South railway station

Like many metro systems around the world, the Shanghai Metro operates on a distance-based fare system. It uses a "one-ticket network", allowing passengers to transfer between interchange stations without needing to buy a new ticket, provided the transfer remains within the metro system. However, at certain stations, transferring to another line may require exiting the fare zone; in such cases, a new single-journey ticket must be purchased before re-entering for the next line. The Shanghai Public Transport Card, which provides access to most public transportation in the city, is exempt from this rule, as it is not consumed upon exit.

All stations are equipped with Shanghai public transport card self-service recharge machines, some of which support card sales and card refund operations. Passengers can also choose to purchase public transport cards to travel. Since 2005, automatic ticket vending machines, which accept banknotes, appeared in Shanghai Metro stations. Automatic ticket vending machines are divided into "coins only" and "coins and banknotes" machines. The "coins only" machine collects 1 yuan and 0.5 yuan coins, and the "coins and banknotes" machine accepts 5, 10, 20, and 50 yuan banknotes, as well as 1 and 0.5 yuan coins. Vending machines will provide change.

=== Children under 1.3 meters ===
One or two children not taller than 1.3 meters (inclusive) are exempted from paying a fare in accompany of another passenger. In cases of more than two, the passenger should buy tickets. A preschool child, unattended by an adult, is not allowed to take the train alone.

=== Periodic pass ===
A pass for unlimited travel within the metro system for either 24 or 72 hours is offered. This pass is not available through vending machines, but has to be purchased at Service Centers at metro stations.

- A one-day pass priced at 18 yuan. This pass was introduced on April 24, 2010, for the Expo 2010 held in Shanghai.
- A three-day pass priced at 45 yuan. This pass was available since March 8, 2012.
- A Maglev single trip ticket and metro ticket priced at 55 yuan. This pass allows for a ride on the Shanghai Maglev Train and unlimited travel within the metro system for 24 hours. A Maglev round trip and metro ticket is priced at 85 yuan.

=== Distance-based fare ===
- The base fare is 3 yuan (RMB) for journeys under 6 km, then 1 yuan for each additional 10 km. As of December 2017, the highest fare is 15 yuan (travel between Xicen to Dishui Lake, the farthest distance at present). This fare scheme has not changed since September 15, 2005.

¥3
0 ~ 6 km
¥4
6 ~ 16 km
¥5
16 ~ 26 km
¥6
26 ~ 36 km
¥7
36 ~ 46 km
¥8
46 ~ 56 km
¥9
56 ~ 66 km
¥10
66 ~ 76 km
¥11
76 ~ 86 km
¥12
86 ~ 96 km
¥13
96 ~ 106 km
¥14
106 ~ 116 km

- Shortest route calculated as multiple route available between any entry-exit stations.
- Travel time limit is 4 hour. Additional lowest single journey fare (3 yuan) is required if time limit is exceeded.
- For journeys exclusively from Xinzhuang Station to People's Square Station, the fare is 4 yuan, though the distance between People's Square Station and Xinzhuang Station is about 17.8 km (11.1 mi).

Only passengers with unused tickets at the station on the day can refund tickets at the service center. Refunds can also be processed in the event of a train failure for more than 15 minutes, and the apology letter can be downloaded on the official website, WeChat public account and Metropolis app.

==== Single-Journey Ticket ====
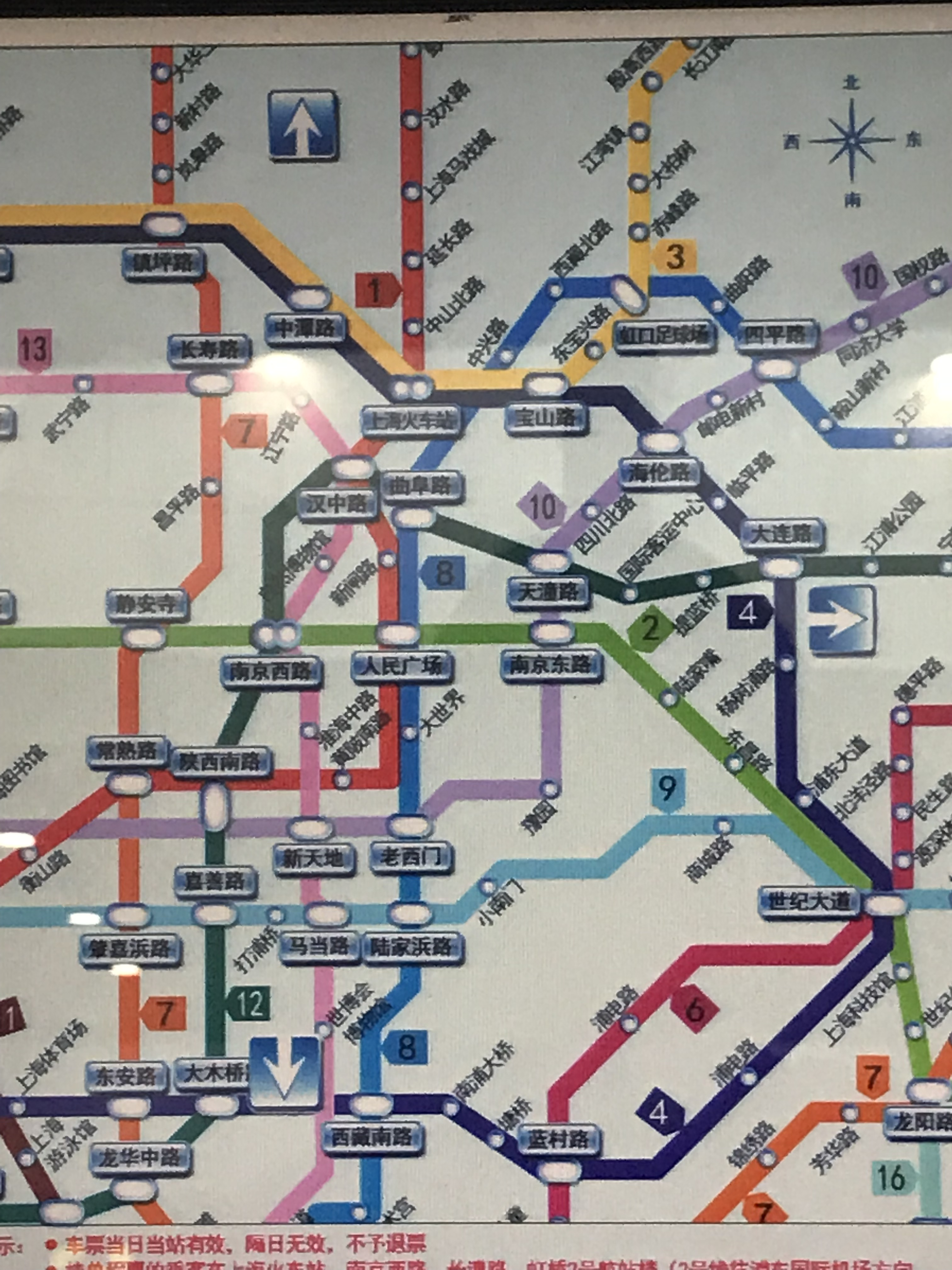
Shanghai metro ticketing machine map

A Shanghai metro single journey ticket with QR code introduced in 2023

Single-Journey tickets can be purchased from ticket vending machines, and at some stations, at a ticket window. Single-ride tickets are embedded with RFID contactless chips. When entering the system riders tap the ticket against a scanner above the turnstile, and when they exit they insert the ticket into a slot where it is stored and recycled. This ticket does not facilitate transfers at a virtual interchange station. Passengers would have to purchase a new ticket when reentering the fare gate. The QR code single journey ticket was introduced at People's Square Station in 2023, which expanded to more stations, and instead of the traditional IC cards. Passengers scan the code to enter and exit stations, and can keep tickets as souvenirs.

==== Public transportation card ====
In addition to a single-ride ticket, the fare can be paid using a Shanghai public transport card. Transportation card of other cities that utilizes China T-Union can also be used in Shanghai Metro. This RFID-embedded card can be purchased at selected banks, convenience stores and metro stations with a 20-yuan deposit. This card can be loaded at ticket booths, Service Centers at the metro stations as well as many small convenience stores and banks throughout the city. The Shanghai Public Transportation Card can also be used to pay for other forms of transportation, such as taxi or bus. Refunds can be obtained at selected stations. (Note: Refunds of the Shanghai Public Transportation Card are available between 9:00-19:00 at line 1: Jinjiang Park, Hengshan Road, Hanzhong Road and Gongkang Road; line 2: Songhong Road, Jiangsu Road, Century Park and Haitiansan Road; line 3: Caoxi Road, Zhongtan Road, Dongbaoxing Road and North Jiangyang Road; line 4: Yangshupu Road.)

Discounts for SPTC holders:

- Cumulative discount: Users of the Shanghai public transport card or QR codes get a 10% discount for the rest of the calendar month after paying 70 yuan in taking metro, The discount is applied only for journeys after the payment; it is not retroactively applied to previous journeys.
- Virtual-transportation discount: Transfers at virtual interchange stations the fare will be calculated continuously. This discount is also applicable for T-Union transportation cards of other cities and Shanghai Public Transportation QR code.
- Combined ride discount: Users of the Shanghai public transport card and QR codes get a 1 yuan discount when transferring to the metro within 120 minutes. (The 10% monthly discount may be applied after the transfer discount.) This discount also applies for a bus to Metro and bus to bus transfers and can accumulate over multiple transfers. Depending on the time spent at the destination the discount will be applied at the start of the return trip as well, making the cost of a round-trip 11 yuan instead of the 16 yuan that would normally be charged without the card.

==== Mobile payment methods ====
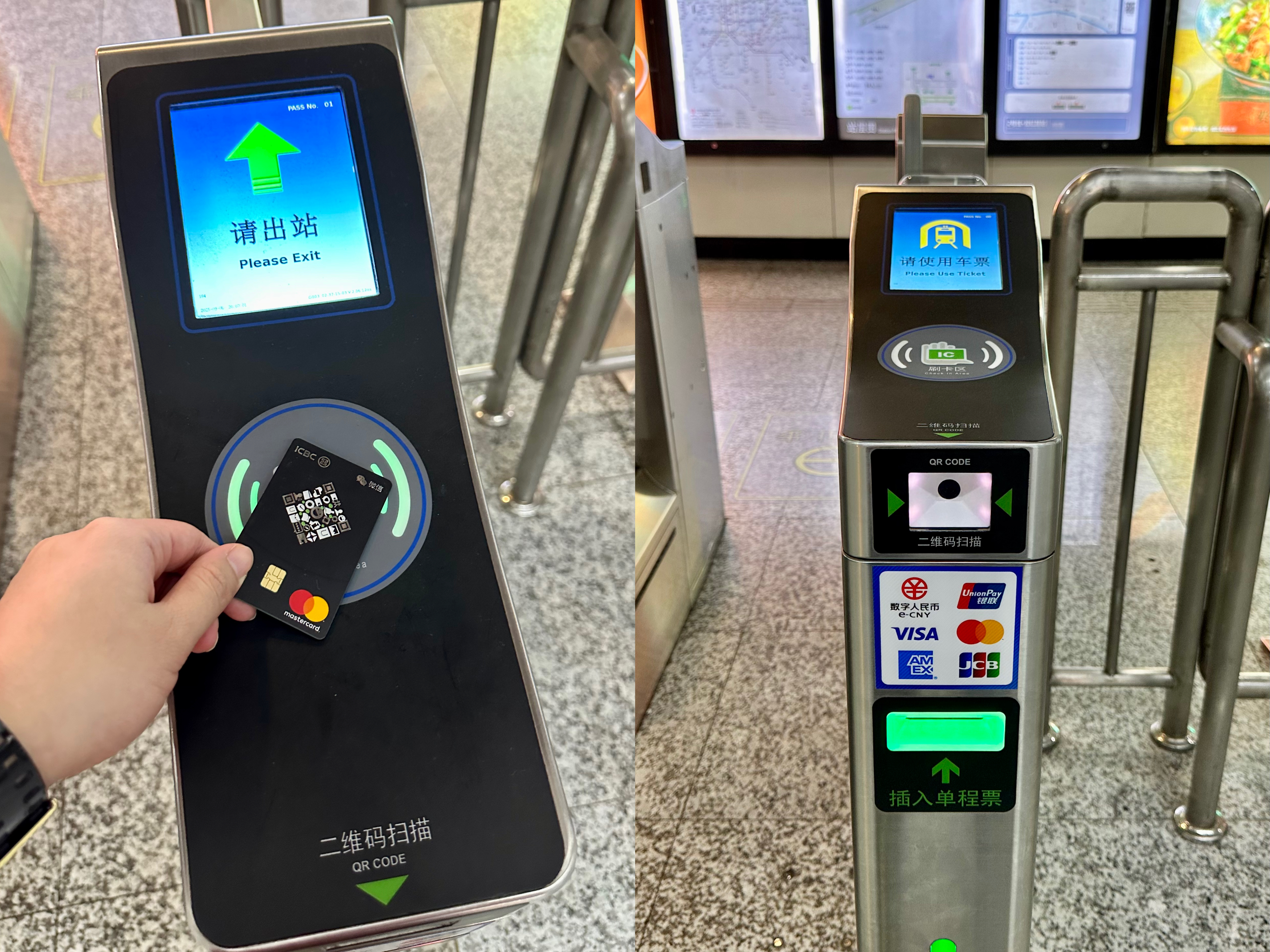
Mastercard, Visa, JCB, American Express, and UnionPay are accepted across the Shanghai Metro. Simply tap the contactless card or mobile device at the gate to ride the metro.

Passengers can also pay their Shanghai Metro fares using a mobile phone app, Daduhui (Metro Metropolis) since January 2018. The app requires one to scan a QR code when entering the fare gate at the origin station and again when exiting at the destination station. The fare is then deducted. The system supports Alipay, WeChat Pay and Union Pay, three of the most commonly used mobile payment methods in China.

The Shanghai Public Transportation QR Code, which is accessible through Alipay, WeChat and other applications, has been accepted on the Shanghai Metro since 2022. The usage of the Shanghai Public Transportation QR Code does not require bluetooth. Furthermore, users of the aforementioned QR Code are entitled to the same fare discounts as users of a Shanghai Public Transportation Card.

=== Fare evasion ===
The official reported daily fare evasion rate accounts for about 0.16% of the total passenger flow. In the Shanghai Metro fare evasion will result in a fine of 6 times the fare.

Shanghai Metro have been cooperating with police to crack down on subway fare evasion. In 2012, the Shanghai Metro has reported 202,457 counts fare evasion, and an additional 472,898 yuan of adjusted fare was collected. Since June 3, 2013, the subway operator announced that all evaders will be recorded in the personal credit information system, which may lead to obstacles in loan applications and job hunting in the future. However, in actual implementation, the subway law enforcement officers only took the above measures for those who refused to make up the fare; and in some stations where fare evasion often occurred, the ticket gates were changed from the original three-bar type to gate type gates.

== Controversies and incidents ==
=== Class C cars ===
In 1999, Shanghai Electric and Alstom Metropolis signed an agreement to invest 28 million US dollars to establish Shanghai Alstom Transportation Equipment Co., Ltd., and introduce a rail transit train production line in Minhang, which would be able to assemble 300 trains annually. Shanghai Alstom only had the national license to produce C-class cars from its establishment and no license to produce A-class cars. At that time, the municipal government stipulated that Shanghai would purchase 300 C cars produced by the new company on lines 5, 6, and 8 of the future rail transit construction. The two parties reached an agreement on the purchase of 300 cars at that time. For this reason, the Transportation Research Institute had to "reduce" the predicted passenger flow to accommodate the C-class railcars, allowing for a reduction of the station's civil construction scope for the smaller trains. In the construction of lines 5, 6, and 8, the railcars were not supplied by the completion of the tender, but by a signed agreement for the railcars after "internal consultation and coordination" between Shentong Group and Shanghai Alstom, a violation of Articles 3 and 4 of the Law of the People's Republic of China on Tendering and Bidding.

The person in charge of the passenger flow forecasting project of line 8 confirmed that the passenger flow forecast report of line 8 was not completed until 2005 after continuous revision. However, in 2003 an agreement was signed for line 8 to supply 168 C-class vehicles, i.e., Shentong Group signed an agreement with Shanghai Alstom two years before the release of the forecast report, and decided to use the C-class car. At that time, it was predicted that the forecast passenger flow of line 8 would be about 500,000 passengers per day during the three years from 2007 to 2010. The operator used as initial forecast passenger flow of only 200,000 passengers per day. Line 8 was extremely congested upon opening, even leading to physical conflicts between passengers. In 2010, to deal with the overcrowding, Shanghai Metro hired passenger pushers to assist commuters boarding line 8 trains. Today, line 8 carries up to over 1 million passengers a day.

The estimated passenger flow of Line 6 was more than 105,000. However, the highest passenger flow in the first few days of opening reached 150,000. With a headway of 13.5 minutes at opening and only four carriages, during peak hours people had to wait 45 minutes to get a ride. The relevant departments did not conduct a comprehensive survey of the residents around the proposed line to estimate passenger flow but instead household registration data was used which excludes migrant populations.

=== Other controversies ===
In June 2012, Shanghai Metro published a post on Weibo asking women to wear more clothing in public. The post argued that it was not surprising for women to be harassed in the subway if they are wearing revealing clothing and called on women to cherish themselves. This post attracted backlash from women's rights advocates and feminists who called the post misogynistic.

=== Train collisions and incidents ===
- March 24, 2004: An evening crash at the turnaround line north of Tonghe Xincun station occurred during testing of the north extension of the line 1 (which opened on December 28, 2004), set 122 had a sideswipe with set 102, resulting in car 92113 damaged beyond repair. In 2007, the damaged car was replaced with a new car. Details of the crash have not yet been released.
- December 22, 2009, at 5:58 a.m., an electrical fault in the tunnel between South Shaanxi Road station and People's Square station caused a few trains to stall. The tripping failure of the power supply catenary was caused by the top of the tunnel falling down and causing a short circuit. The segment between Hengshan Road and Hanzhong Road was suspended. At 6:54 a.m., while the track was under repair, a low-speed collision occurred between two trains on line 1 at Shanghai railway station. As train set 0150 went to the Shanghai railway station's turnaround, the signalling system sent a speed code of 65 km/h instead of 20 km/h. This resulted in insufficient braking distance as the distance between set 0150 and set 117 was only 118 meters when the signal system sent a code of a speed of 0 km/h. As train set 0150 increased speed from 60.5 km/h to 62 km/h, the train driver commenced emergency braking, preventing a more serious collision. The train collided at a speed of 17 km/h with the side of the rear of set 117 entering the turnaround track from the down platform in the reverse direction. Nobody was injured, but the cars 013151, 98033 and 98042 were badly damaged. There were no passengers aboard set 117. Service resumed at 11:48 a.m. Some passengers on set 0150 were in the train until 11 a.m. The crashes affected millions of morning commuters and occurred during Dongzhi Festival, when people visit cemeteries to pay tribute to their departed ancestors.
  At 8.40 p.m. another crash occurred and the Hengshan Road - Shanghai Railway Station section was suspended again. A fire broke out at the substation in South Shaanxi Road, due to a transformer failure caused by fluctuations in the power supply of the external network.
- July 27, 2011, in the evening, after a train of line 10 was sent from Longxi Road station, it was supposed to be sent to Hangzhong Road station (branch line), but it was sent to Hongqiao Railway Station by mistake, and then stopped at the Shanghai Zoo station for passengers going to Hangzhong Road station to disembark. The Shanghai Metro claimed that the incident was caused by "signal debugging failure".
- September 27, 2011, at 2:51 p.m., two trains on line 10 collided between Yuyuan Garden station and Laoximen station, injuring 284–300 people. Initial investigations found that train operators violated regulations while operating the trains manually after a loss of power on the line caused its signal system to fail. No deaths were reported.
- March 12, 2013, at 16:12, the second car of a line 5 train derailed near Minhang Development Zone station. There were no casualties. This caused the line 5 to run 48 minutes behind schedule. During the delay, the line was cut back to Jinping Road and service to the Minhang Development Zone was served by the Jiangchuan Route 1 shuttle bus. The subway said the accident was caused by "signal equipment failure."
- 22 December 2024, at 8:00, a Line 11 train (set 1173) traveling at 100km/h between Malu and Wuwei Road collided with a construction crane working on a road connecting the Shanghai-Jiading Expressway and Jiamin Expressway. Most of the glass in the front carriage shattered, and the driver cabin partially collapsed. No people were injured, but the track and train were damaged. The track between Malu and Wuwei Road was closed until 21:30, after all repairs were made. A replacement bus was offered to commuters until then.
- January 7, 2026: A power bank a man carried exploded at Shanghai West Railway Station on line 15, setting fire to his jacket. Passengers were evacuated by staff and used a fire extinguisher to extinguish the blaze. The power bank carries the China Compulsory Certificate (CCC) mark. While it has been mandated that only power banks with CCC marks can be brought on domestic flights within China, with unclear CCC marks, recalled batches also banned, Shanghai Metro does not prohibit power banks without CCC marks.

=== Platform screen door incidents ===
- End of July 2006 at the Shanghai Stadium station on line 4 at about 7:50 p.m. a middle-aged woman accidentally caught her foot between the train and the platform as a group of passengers swarmed aboard the train. She pulled out her foot, but her shoe fell under the platform, and she suffered skin trauma.
- July 15, 2007, at 3:34 p.m., 47-year-old Sun Mou entered a southbound line 1 train at Shanghai Indoor Stadium station and got caught between the screen door and the moving train. The train buzzer and screen door lights were activated while the passenger tried to get into the car, but he was unable to squeeze into the compartment due to the crowding. Sun's mother sued Shanghai Metro for 1.18 million yuan. The man was found to be carrying 0.29 grams of heroin, and the drug was detected in his blood. As platform screen doors had repeatedly caught people, officials said safety switches will be installed on the inside of the screen doors. If someone touches the safety switch, the train will be suspended. A laser detection device was under development to reduce the chance of similar incidents.
- July 24, 2007, at 2:41 p.m. A passenger entered a northbound line 1 train at Xujiahui station when the buzzer sounded. His laptop bag was caught between the train door and the screen door and hit the tunnel wall, falling to the roadbed as the train began to move. The laptop was valued at 11,350 yuan and Shanghai Metro was only willing to compensate 2,500 yuan. The passenger took the matter to court, and both parties were ultimately found at fault.
- On July 5, 2010, at the Zhongshan Park station, a woman died after she was dragged between the train and the platform screen doors when the train started moving, causing her body to collide with a safety barrier.
- On June 6, 2018, at People's Square station on line 8 at about 4 p.m. a woman suffered a head injury after she became stuck between the platform screen doors. She later unsuccessfully sued the metro operator for hospital expenses, and claimed she did not hear the door closing chime.
- On January 22, 2022, at 16:30 on line 15 Qi'an Road station an elderly woman was injured and later died after becoming trapped between the platform screen door and train.

== Subway culture ==
=== Logo ===

The Shanghai Metro logo is a circular pattern composed of the first letters "S" and "M" of the English "Shanghai Metro", which means that the subway runs around the city and extends in all directions. The design reflects the rapid and convenient subway transportation and the speed of subway development. The logo is red, the font is black, and the background color is white:

- Red symbolizes the young, vigorous and prosperous Shanghai subway business;
- Black symbolizes the firm belief and pursuit of the subway enterprise to shoulder historical responsibilities and perseverance;
- White symbolizes the brilliant vision of the subway employees' wisdom, talent and fighting spirit.

=== Mascot ===
On February 4, 2010, in the run-up to the 2010 World Expo in Shanghai, the subway mascot named Changchang (Chinese: 畅畅) was unveiled. The mascot is a boy with red, white and blue as the main colors. Changchang means "happiness, smoothness, and imagination", which not only reflects the happiness that Shanghai subway brings to the city and life, but also reflects the dense network and unimpeded development of the subway throughout the city. It symbolizes its infinite possibilities to meet the diversified future.

- Its helmet symbolizes technology and speed, and the subway logo on the helmet reflects the identity of the subway mascot;
- The mask is based on the subway cab as the prototype, which represents the concept of operation, and also has the meaning of "leading";
- The smiling eyes reflect the kindness and enthusiasm of Shanghai Metro, and it implies smiling service and warm transportation;
- The "smooth" raised arms and the outstretched hands symbolize that the subway, as an important means of transportation in Shanghai, welcomes passengers at home and abroad with cordial service;
- The feet represent the safety and comfort of the Shanghai subway;
- The wheels on the feet symbolize technology and speed.

=== Other ===
- Unveiled on August 13, 2021, Xujiahui Station has a statue of Liu Jianhang, chief engineer of Shanghai Metro when Line 1 was constructed in 1990.

=== Museum ===
- Shanghai Metro Museum
- Shanghai Maglev Museum

== Network map and statistics ==
The following data displays the system length of Shanghai Metro and the number of stations.
