= Shanghai North railway station =

Former railway station

Coordinates: 31°15′00″N 121°28′34″E

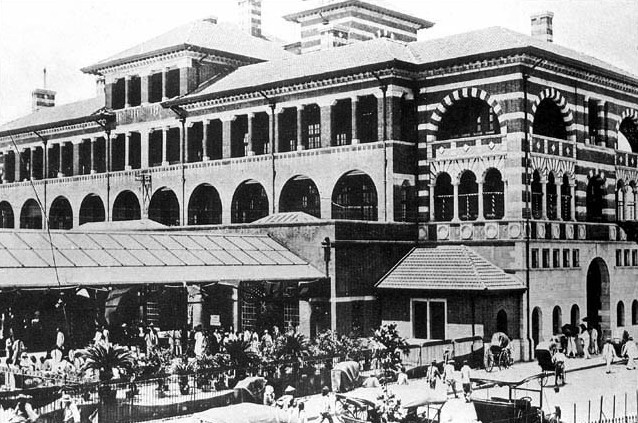
The newly completed Shanghai North railway station in 1908

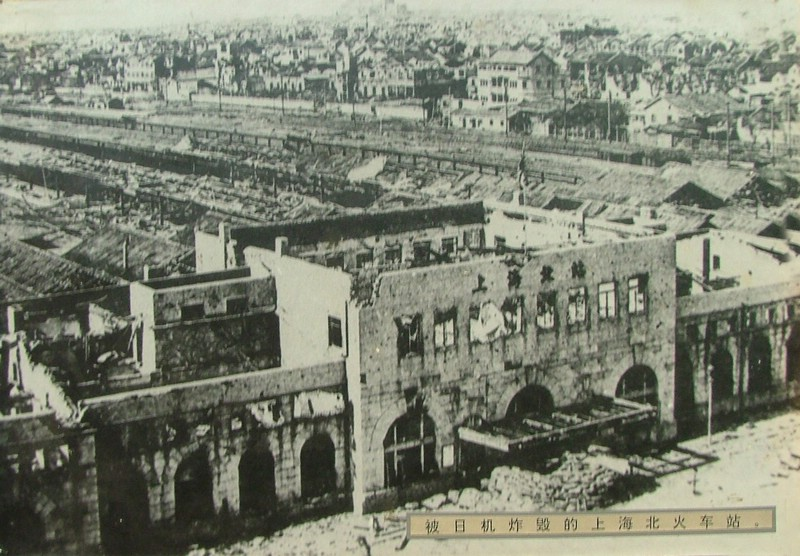
The station in 1937, after Japanese bombing

Shanghai North railway station (Chinese: 上海北站), located on East Tianmu Road, was the main railway station of Shanghai during most of the 20th century. It was closed in 1987 and a replica of the original 1909 building, erected on the same site, is now the Shanghai Railway Museum. The station tracks are still in use as a coach yard. It was also known as the "沪宁铁路上海车站", referring to the Shanghai–Nanjing Railway, of which it was one terminal.

== History ==
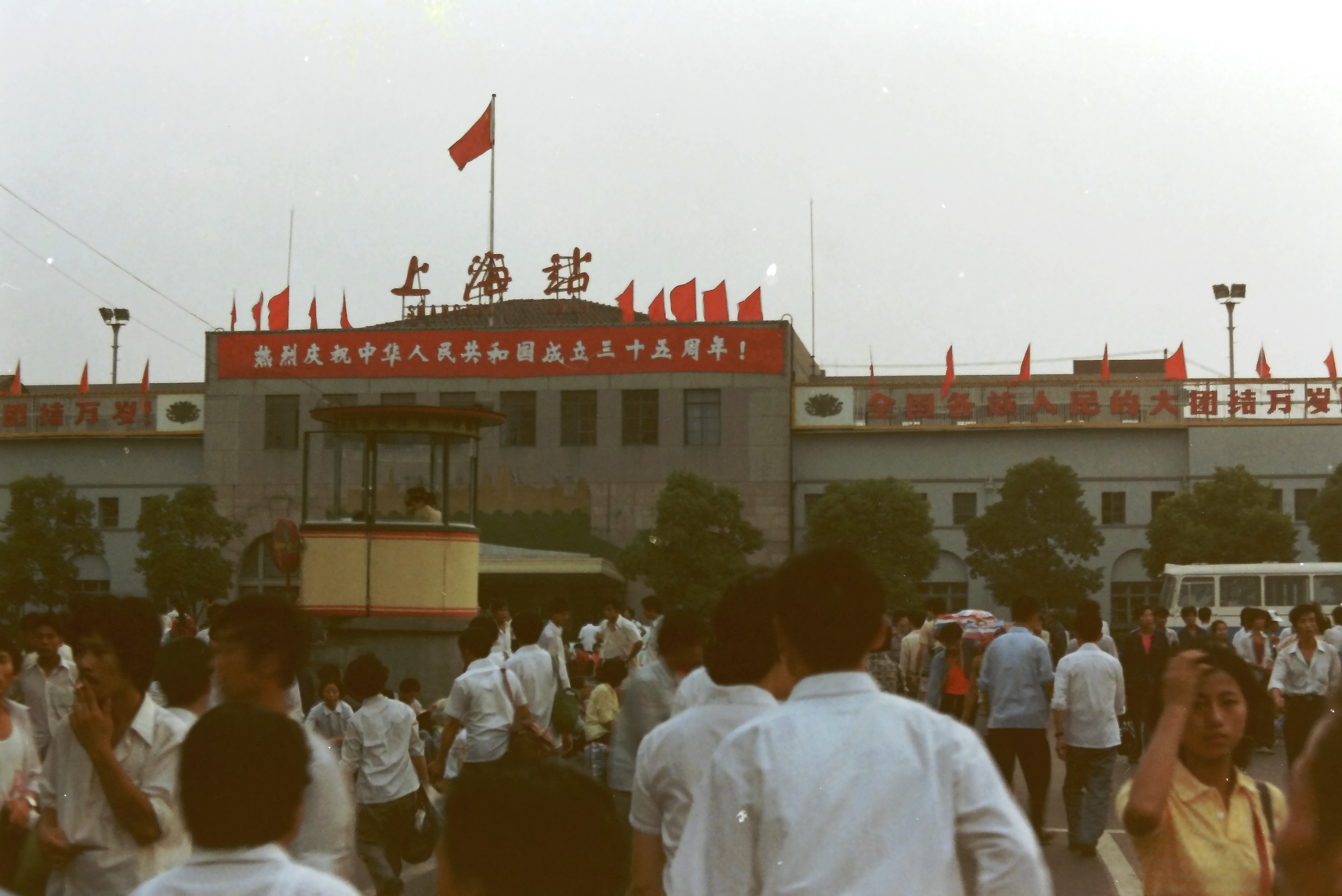
Shanghai railway station in October 1984, three years before it closed

The station was established as the Shanghai railway station in 1909 by the Qing government. It was the site of Premier Song Jiaoren's assassination by Chinese gangsters (probably working at Yuan Shikai's request) on March 20, 1913. It was renamed Shanghai North railway station in 1916. Apart from the railway station itself, at that time the structure consisted of a British-designed four storey office building which was regarded as the symbol for the station. First destroyed in 1932 by the Japanese military during the "Shanghai Incident", the rebuilt structure was again destroyed by the Japanese in 1937 during the Battle of Shanghai. It was rebuilt again after the war and renamed back to Shanghai railway station in 1950.

At the end of 1987, the station was closed down in favor of the new Shanghai railway station located on Molin Road.

== Events ==
The Chinese republican hero, democratic activist, and founder of the Kuomintang, Song Jiaoren, was shot at the railway station on March 20, 1913, shortly after he had led the party to victory in Republican China's first parliamentary elections. Many suspected Yuan Shikai to be behind the assassination.

== Shanghai Railway Museum ==
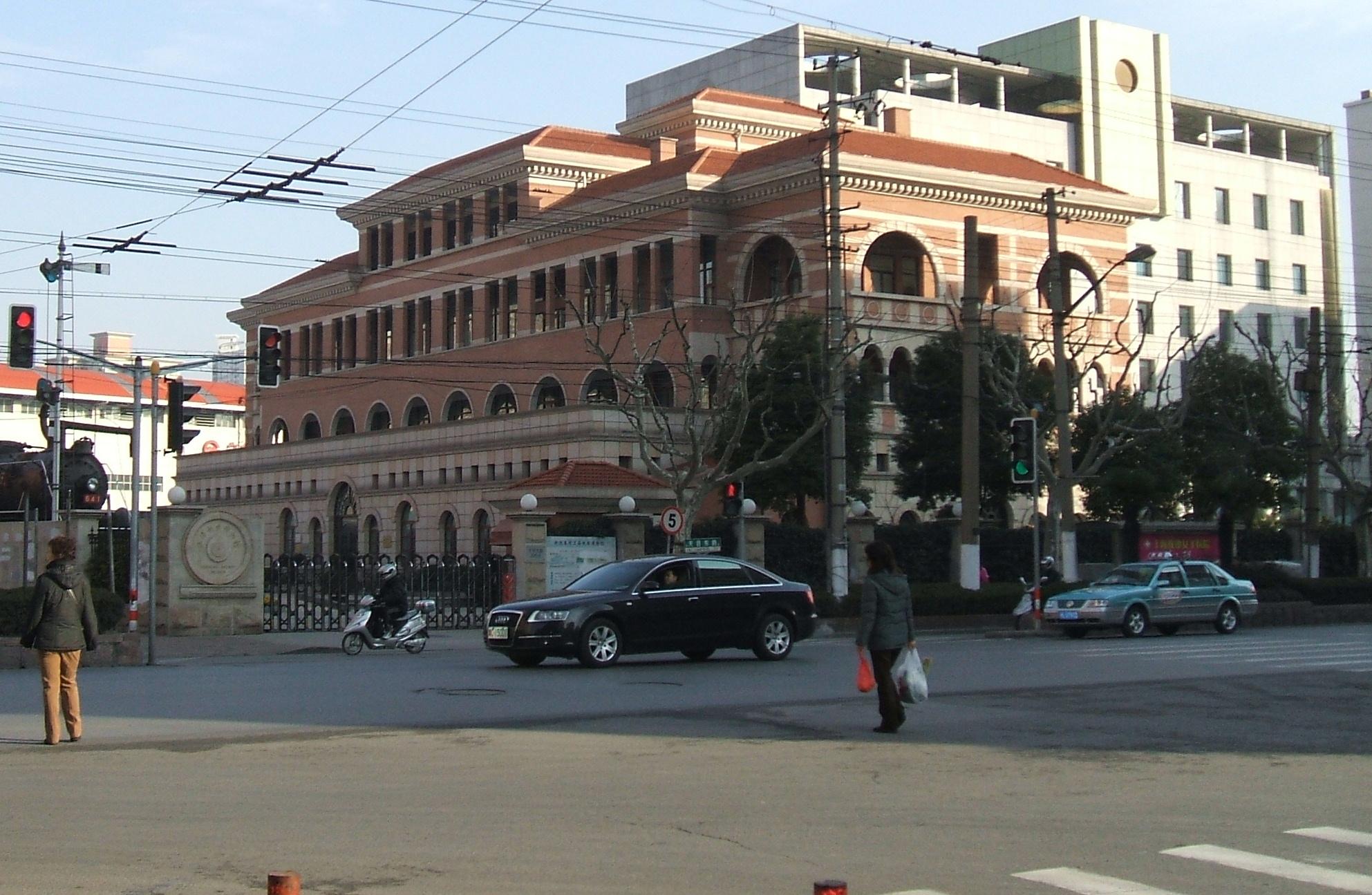
Shanghai North railway station and Railway Museum

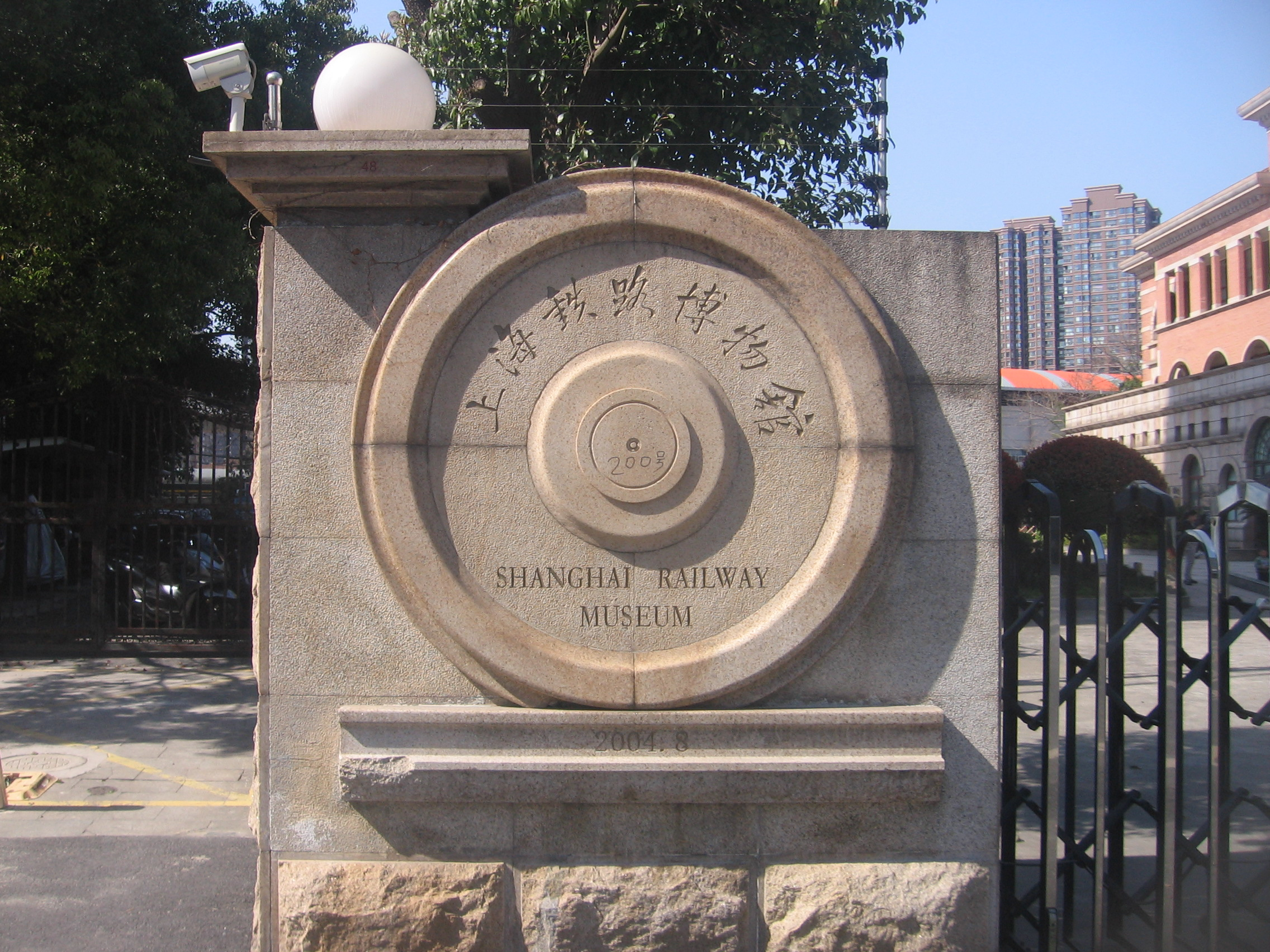
Shanghai Railway Museum

The Shanghai Railway Museum opened to the public in 2004, on the 55th anniversary of the Shanghai Railway Administration, at the former station. The building of the museum itself is a cultural relic (a recreation of the original main railway station built in 1909), which is well maintained. The museum, in the style of a traditional building, has 1,300 square meters of outside exhibition space, and 3000 square meters in the four floors of the main buildings. The museum is a base for science education. About 8,000 students visited the museum to learn about the development of high speed railways.

On display are pictures, historical books and artifacts related to the history of constructing the Shanghai Railway and the development of railway transportation. Museum exhibits include models of trains, CRH380A simulation cab, and Hexie type one locomotive simulator. The history of the railways in China is brought back to memories with photographs, as well as the tools and equipment used by the railway men in the past. There are two locomotives outside and lots of small artifacts inside. A black and white video is well worth watching.

- There is a free audio commentary available in English.
- An English language guide is available upon request.
- Admission is 10 yuan for adults or 5 yuan for concessions.
- Opening times: 9am to 11;30am; 2pm to 4:30pm
- Location: 200 Tianmu East Road, Jing'an district

Around 800m from Baoshan Road station on Shanghai Metro line 3 / 4 (turn around the block: exit gate 1, turn right three times, museum on the right)

The museum planned to update in 2016, including building exhibits on the second floor, updating the gift shop, and repairing the Hexie type one locomotive simulator.

== See also ==
- Shanghai South railway station
- Shanghai Metro Museum
- Shanghai maglev museum
