= North Zhongshan Road station =

Shanghai Metro station

North Zhongshan Road 中山北路
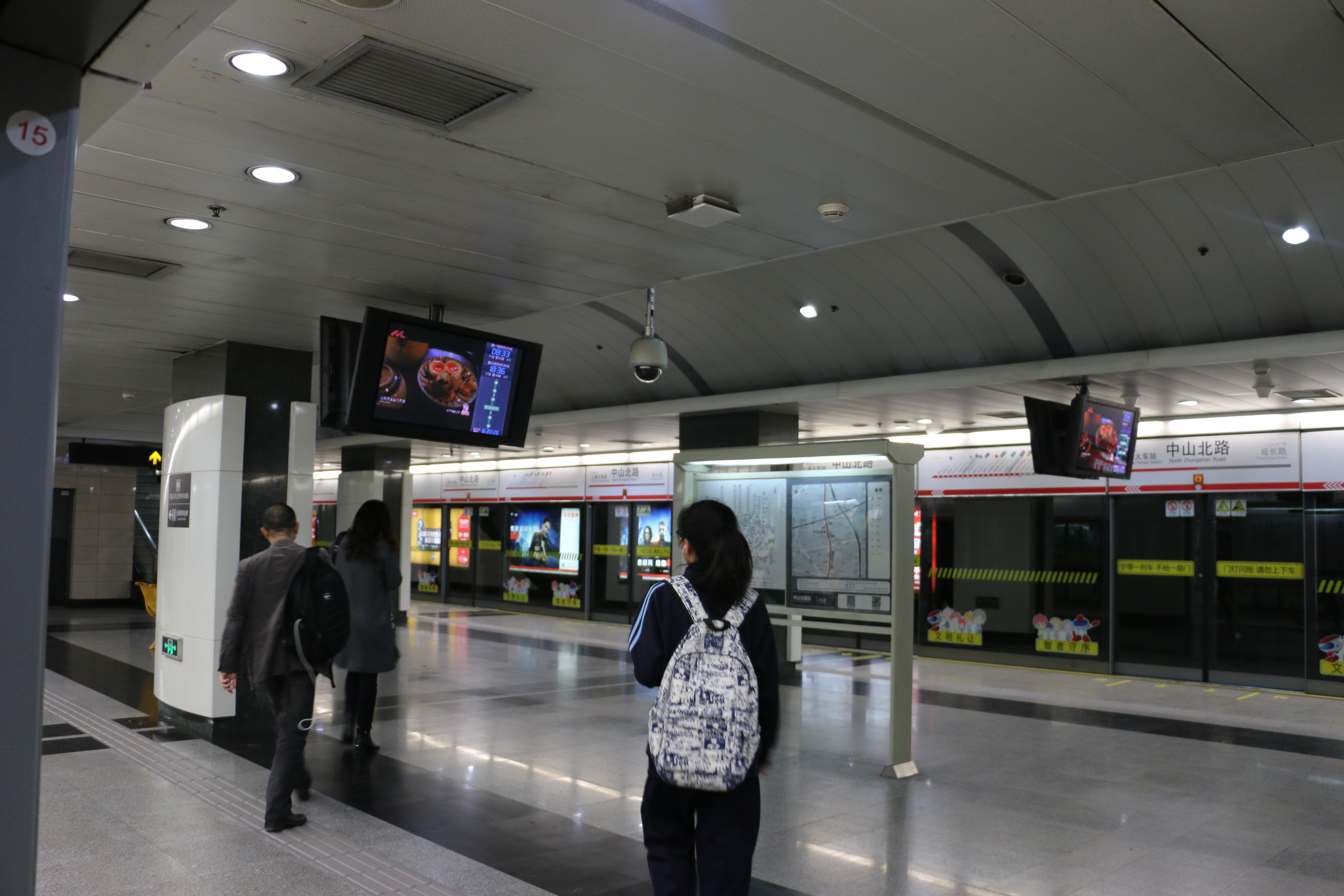
- Station platform

General information
- Location: North Zhongshan Road and Datong Road (大统路); Jing'an District, Shanghai; China
- Coordinates: 31°15′32″N 121°27′33″E
- Operator: Shanghai No. 1 Metro Operation Co. Ltd.
- Line: Line 1
- Platforms: 2 (1 island platform)
- Tracks: 2

Construction
- Structure type: Underground
- Accessible: Yes

Other information
- Station code: L01/17

History
- Opened: 28 December 2004

Services
Preceding station	Shanghai Metro	Following station
Yanchang Road towards Fujin Road	Line 1	Shanghai Railway Station towards Xinzhuang
Location
- Location within Shanghai

North Zhongshan Road (Chinese: 中山北路; pinyin: Zhōngshān Běi Lù) is a station on Shanghai Metro Line 1. This station is part of the northern extension of that line from Shanghai Railway Station to Gongfu Xincun that opened on 28 December 2004. It is named after Zhongshan Road, the inner ring-road of Shanghai.
