= Shanghai Railway Station metro station =

Shanghai Metro interchange station

Shanghai Railway Station 上海火车站
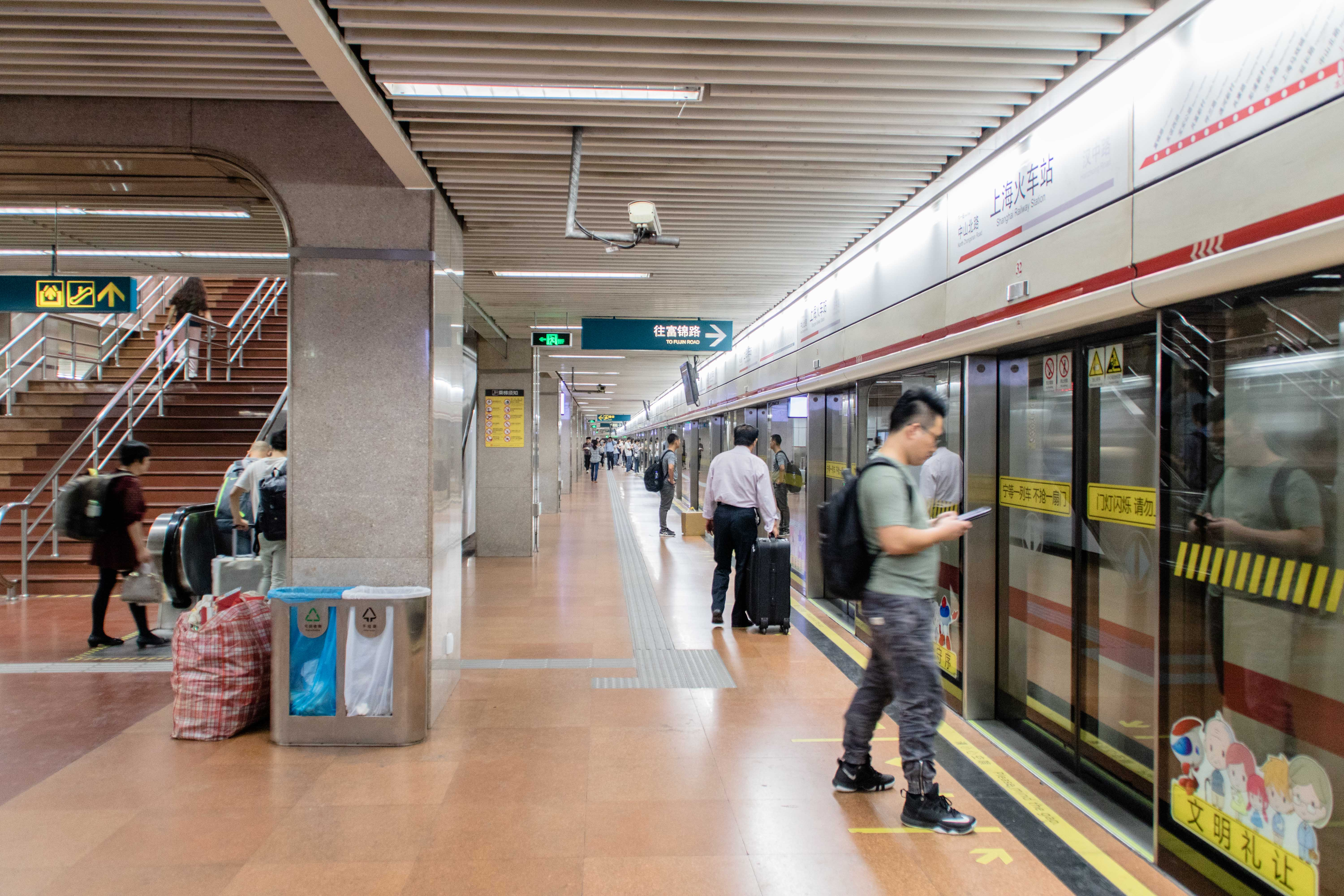
- Line 1 platform

General information
- Location: Moling Road, Jing'an District, Shanghai; China
- Coordinates: 31°14′53″N 121°27′20″E (Line 1); 31°14′59″N 121°27′29″E (Line 3 and Line 4)
- Operator: Shanghai No. 1/3 Metro Operation Co. Ltd.
- Lines: Line 1; Line 3; Line 4
- Platforms: 4 (2 island platforms)
- Tracks: 4
- Connections: Shanghai Railway station (SHH)

Construction
- Structure type: Underground (Line 1); Elevated (Lines 3 & 4)
- Accessible: Yes

Other information
- Station code: L01/16

History
- Opened: 10 April 1995; 31 years ago (Line 1); 26 December 2000; 25 years ago (Line 3); 28 December 2004; 21 years ago (Line 1 north extension to Gongfu Xincun); 31 December 2005; 20 years ago (Line 4)

Services
Preceding station	Shanghai Metro	Following station
North Zhongshan Road towards Fujin Road	Line 1	Hanzhong Road towards Xinzhuang
Baoshan Road towards North Jiangyang Road	Line 3	Zhongtan Road towards Shanghai South Railway Station
Baoshan Road Clockwise	Line 4	Zhongtan Road Counter-clockwise
Location

Shanghai Railway Station (Chinese: 上海火车站; pinyin: Shànghǎi Huǒchēzhàn) is an interchange station between lines 1, 3 and 4 on the Shanghai Metro. It is one of the stations where Line 3 and Line 4 share the same tracks and elevated platforms.

The transfer between Line 1 and lines 3 and 4 is actually quite long and would take around 8 minutes without suitcases. Both metro stations are located on the opposing sides of the train station with a long tunnel connecting both platforms. Passengers transfer between Lines 1 and 3/4 would require two single-journey tickets or separate scans of QR Code. However, fares paid using physical or digital Shanghai Public Transport Card would be calculated as a single journey provided the transfer is completed within 30 minutes.

In addition to being an interchange between metro lines, the station facilitates transfer to Shanghai's main railway station. A tunnel leads directly from the concourse of the metro station to the concourse of the railway station.

This station served as the northern terminus of Line 1 before the extension to Gongfu Xincun opened on 28 December 2004.

== Station layout ==
1F	Southbound/Counterclockwise	← Line 3 towards Shanghai South Railway Station (Zhongtan Road) ← Line 4 to Zhongtan Road
1F	Island platform, doors will open on the left
1F	Northbound/Clockwise	Line 3 towards North Jiangyang Road (Baoshan Road) → Line 4 to Baoshan Road →
1F	Entrances and Exits	Exits 1-6
B1	Lines 1 Concourse	Faregates, Station Agent
B1	Line 3/4 Concourse	Faregates, Station Agent
B2	Northbound	← Line 1 towards Fujin Road (North Zhongshan Road)
B2	Island platform, doors will open on the left
B2	Southbound	Line 1 towards Xinzhuang (Hanzhong Road) →

== Places nearby ==
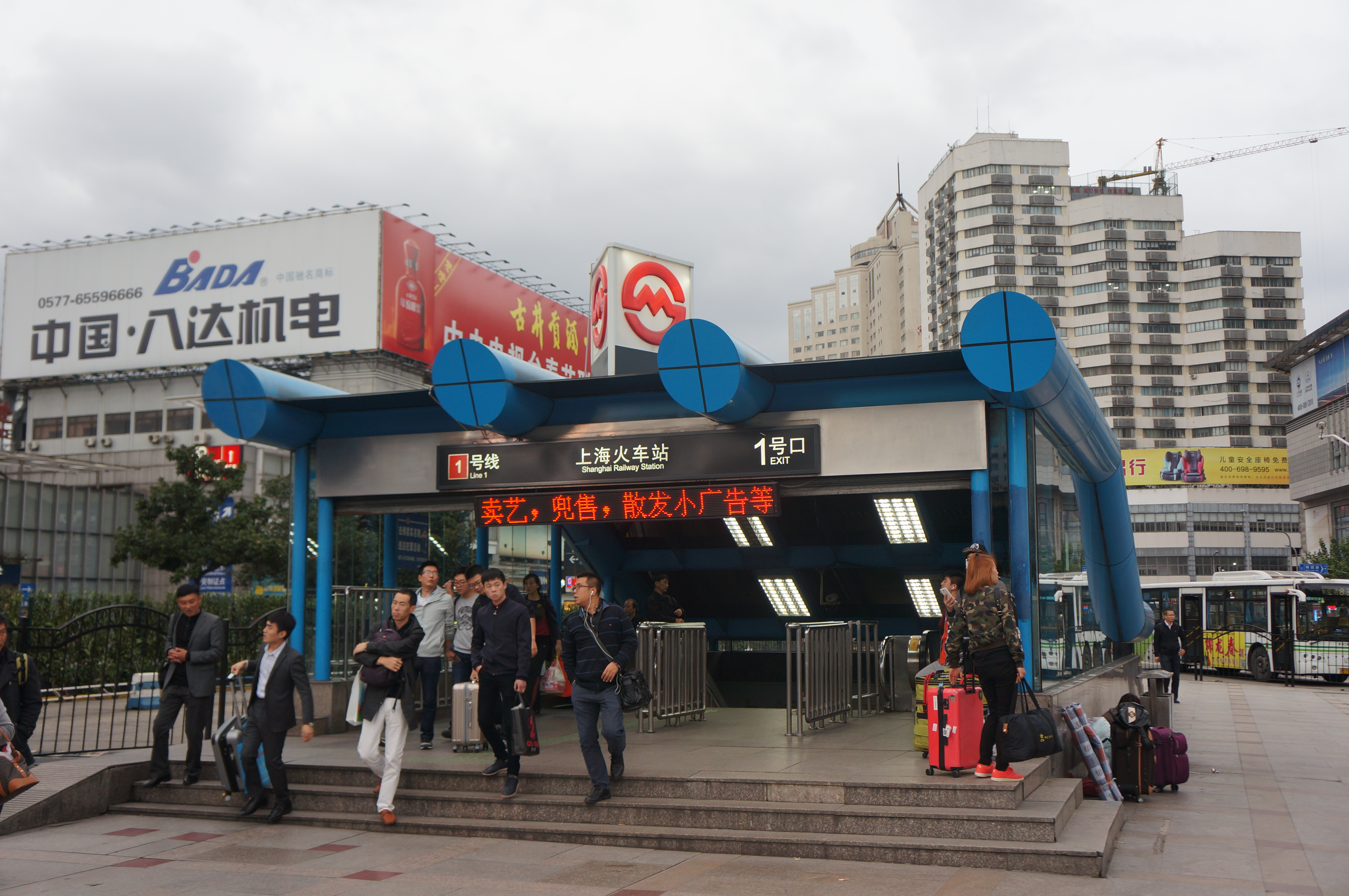
Exit No. 1 for Line 1

- Shanghai railway station
- Shanghai Post Office
- Suzhou Creek
- Shanghai Art District in Moganshan Road (by taxi or longer walk)
