= Langao Road station =

Shanghai Metro station

Langao Road 岚皋路
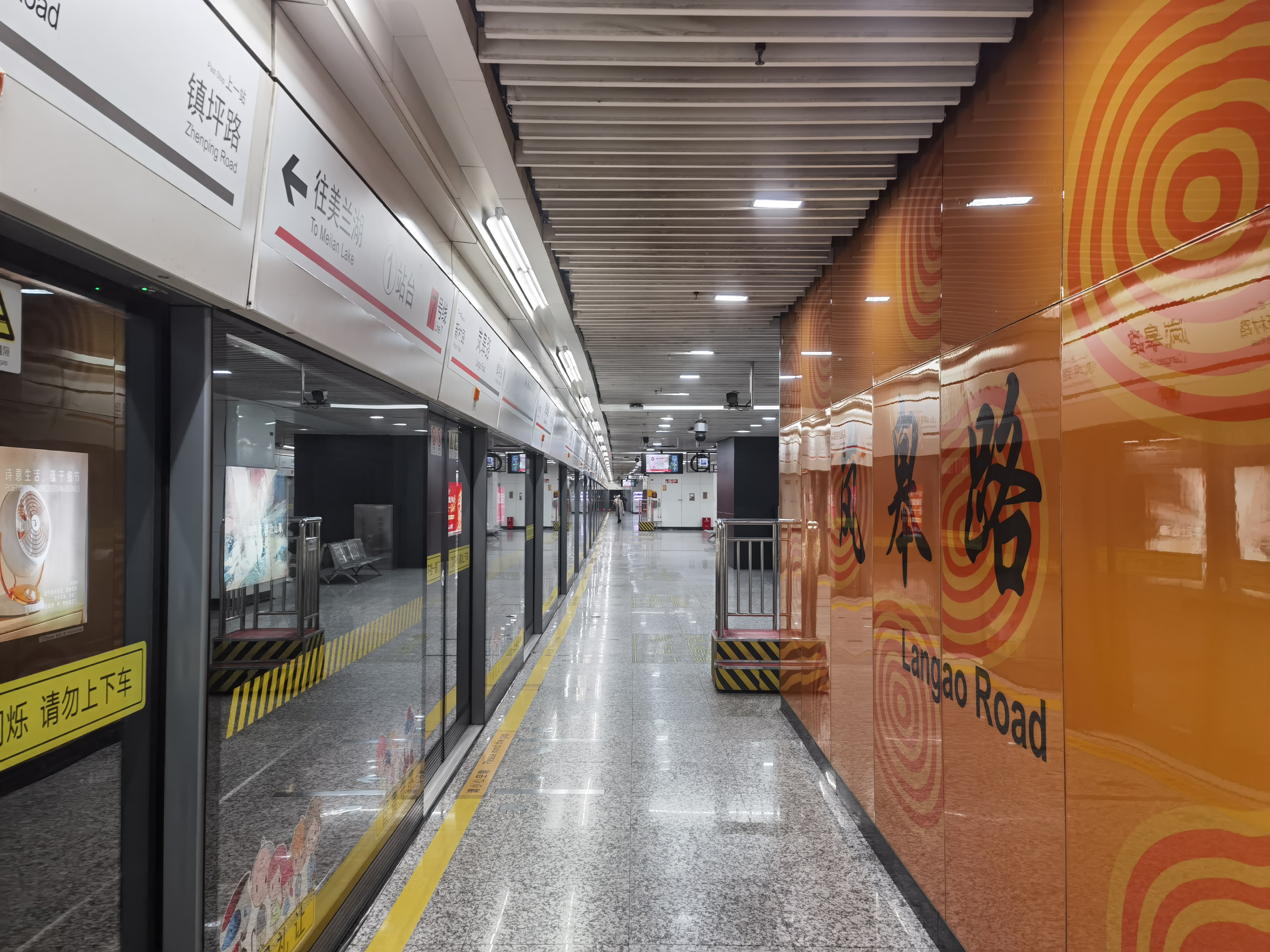
- Station platform

General information
- Location: Langao Road (岚皋路) and Tongchuan Road (铜川路), Putuo District, Shanghai; China
- Coordinates: 31°15′30″N 121°25′01″E
- Line: Line 7
- Platforms: 2 (1 island platform)
- Tracks: 2

Construction
- Structure type: Underground
- Accessible: Yes

History
- Opened: 5 December 2009

Services
Preceding station	Shanghai Metro	Following station
Xincun Road towards Meilan Lake	Line 7	Zhenping Road towards Huamu Road
Location

Langao Road (simplified Chinese: 岚皋路; traditional Chinese: 嵐皋路; pinyin: Lángāo Lù) is a station on Line 7 of the Shanghai Metro, located in Putuo District. It opened in 2009.
