= Baoshan Road station =

Shanghai Metro interchange station

Baoshan Road 宝山路
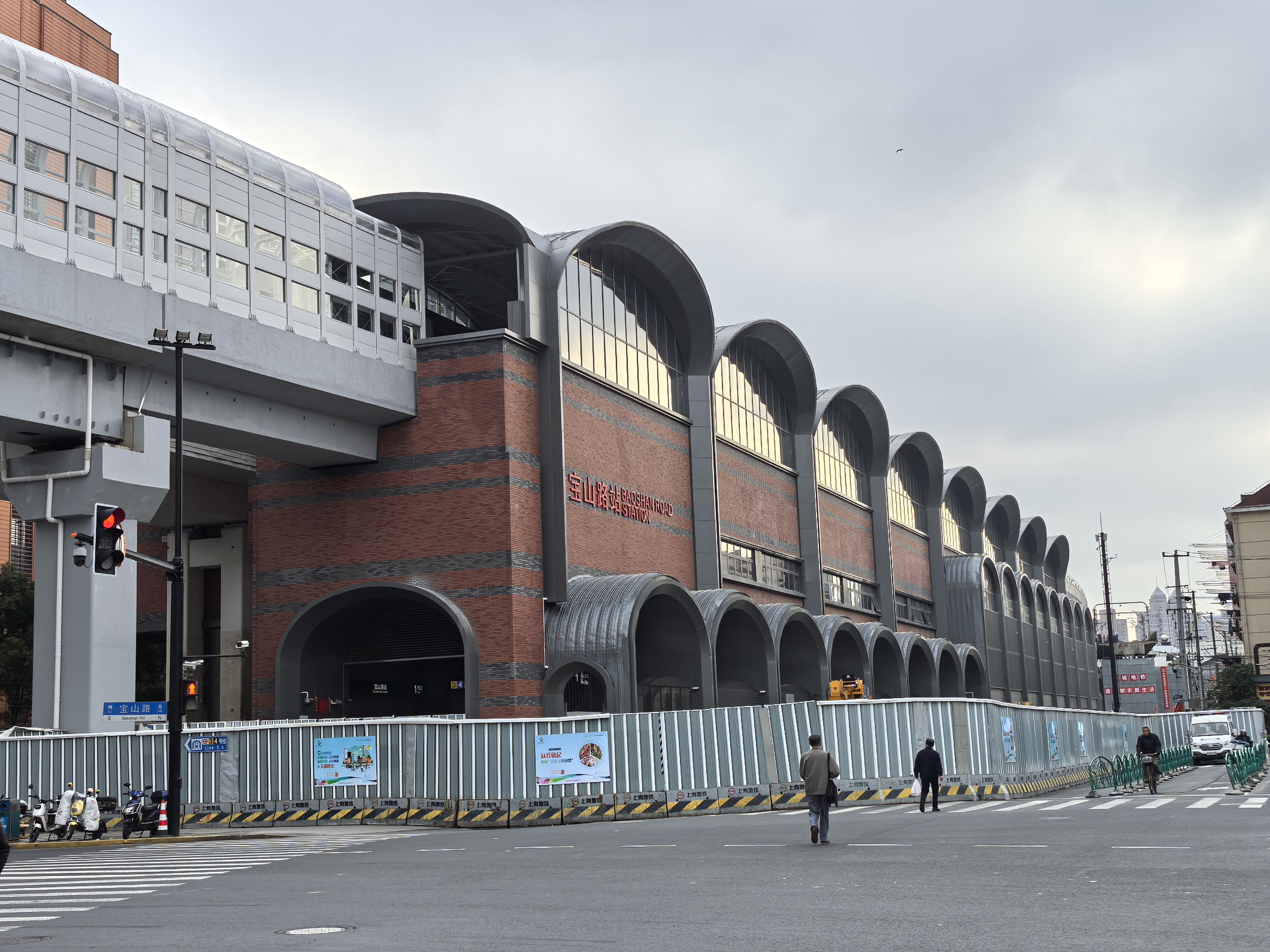
- The renovated station building in February 2026

General information
- Location: Jiaotong Road and Baoshan Road; Jing'an District, Shanghai; China
- Coordinates: 31°15′12″N 121°28′17″E
- Operator: Shanghai No. 3 Metro Operation Co. Ltd.
- Lines: Line 3; Line 4
- Platforms: 3 (1 island platform and 1 side platform)
- Tracks: 3

Construction
- Structure type: Elevated
- Accessible: Yes

History
- Opened: 26 December 2000; 25 years ago (Line 3); 31 December 2005; 20 years ago (Line 4)

Services
Preceding station	Shanghai Metro	Following station
Dongbaoxing Road towards North Jiangyang Road	Line 3	Shanghai Railway Station towards Shanghai South Railway Station
Hailun Road Clockwise	Line 4	Shanghai Railway Station Counter-clockwise
Route map
Location
- Location within Shanghai

Baoshan Road (simplified Chinese: 宝山路; traditional Chinese: 寶山路; pinyin: Bǎoshān Lù) is a station shared between Lines 3 and 4 on the Shanghai Metro. It is located in the former Zhabei District, now part of Jing'an District, and is the northernmost station shared between these lines.

== Station layout ==
3F	Platform 1	← Line 4 counter-clockwise (Shanghai Railway Station)
3F	Island platform, doors open on the left for Line 4, right for Line 3
3F	Platform 2	← Line 3 towards Shanghai South Railway Station (Shanghai Railway Station)
3F	Platform 3	Line 3 towards North Jiangyang Road (Dongbaoxing Road) → Line 4 clockwise (Hailun Road) →
3F	Side platform, doors open on the right
2F	Concourse	Tickets, Service Center
1F	Ground level	Exits

== Entrances/exits ==
- 1: Qiujiang Road, Baoshan Road, East Tianmu Road
- 2: Huiwen Road (会文路), Jiaotong Road
- 3: Qiujiang Road, Jiaotong Road

== Gallery ==
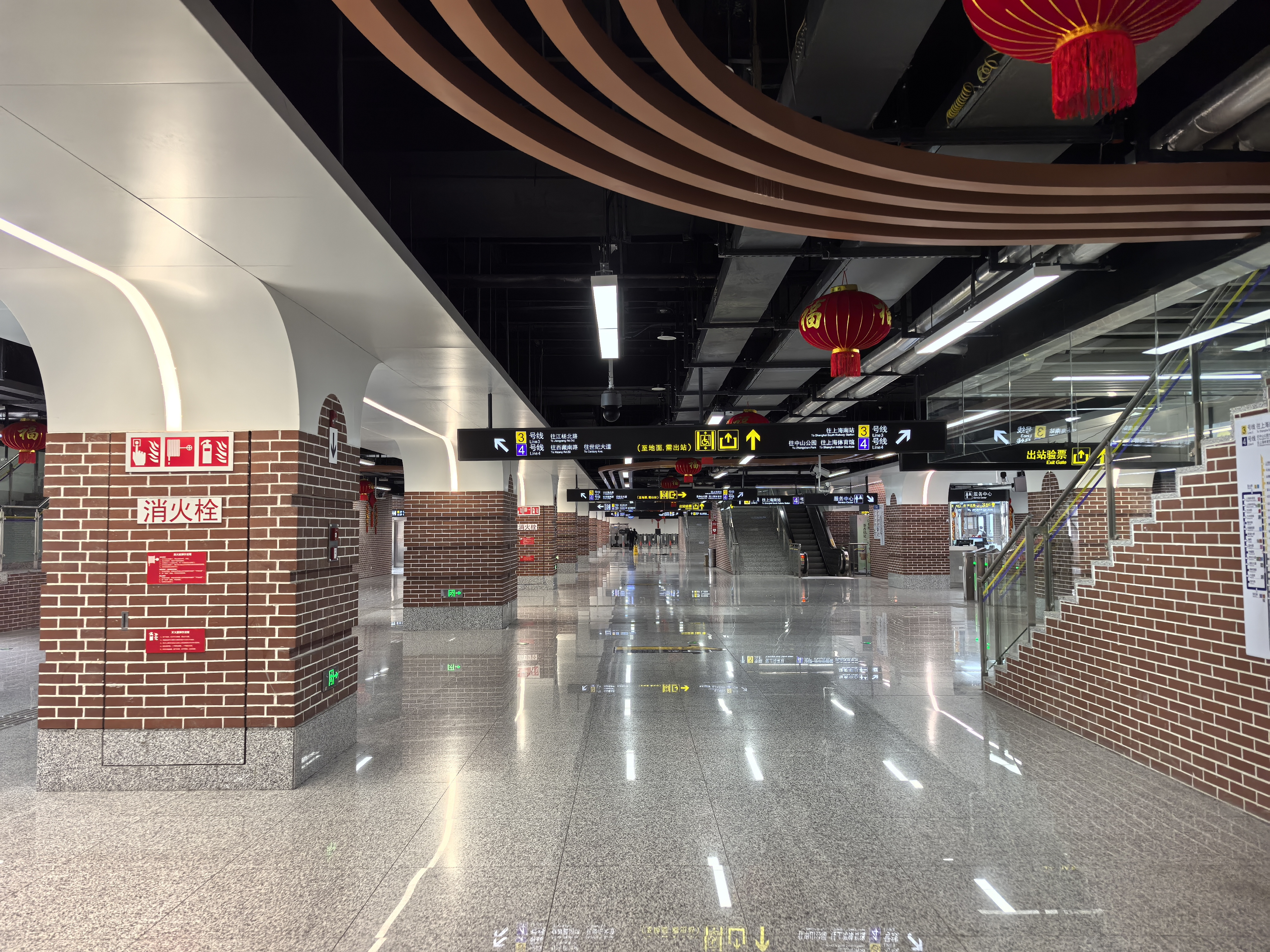
Station Concourse in February 2026

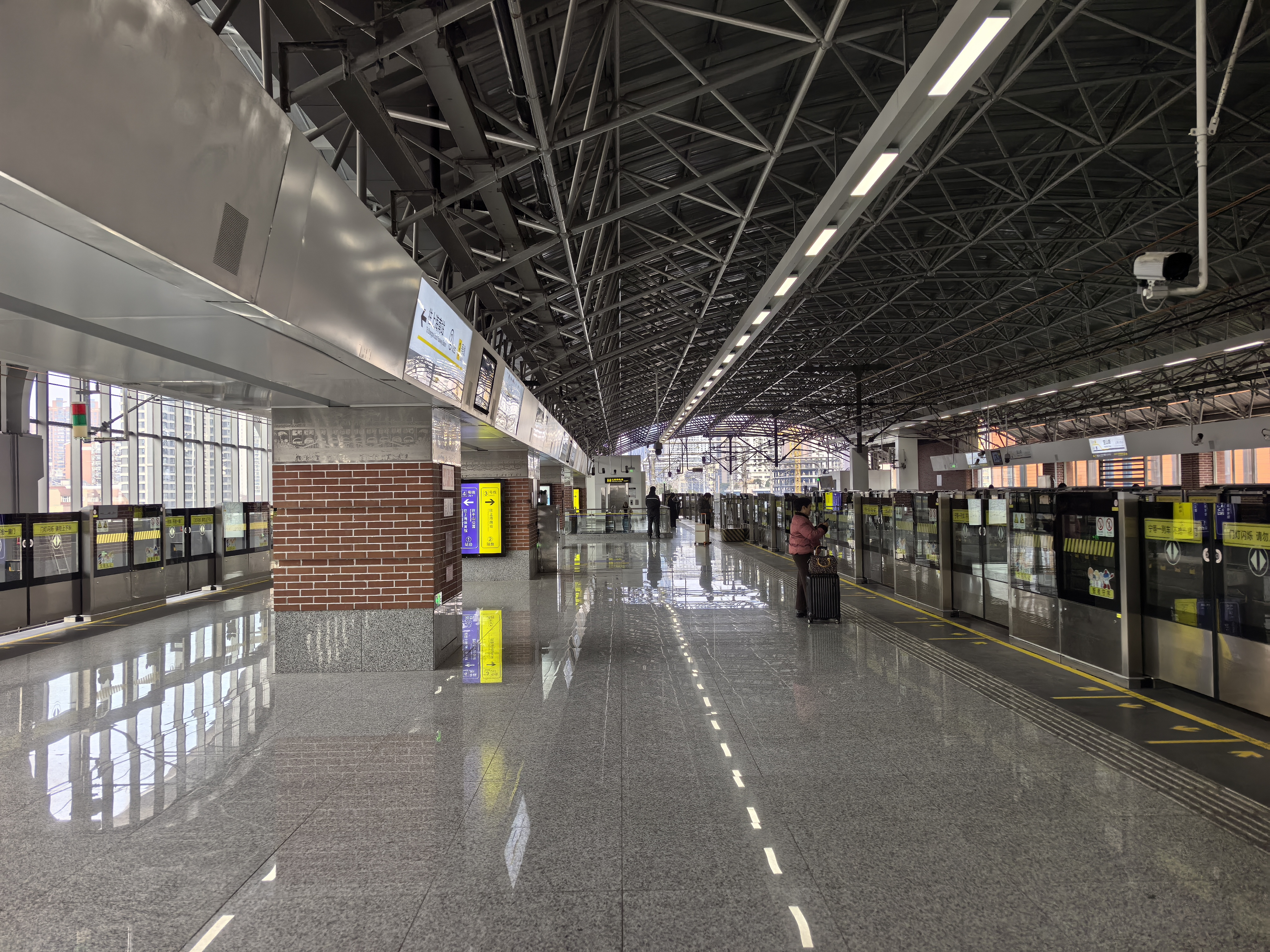
Platforms 1 and 2 in February 2026

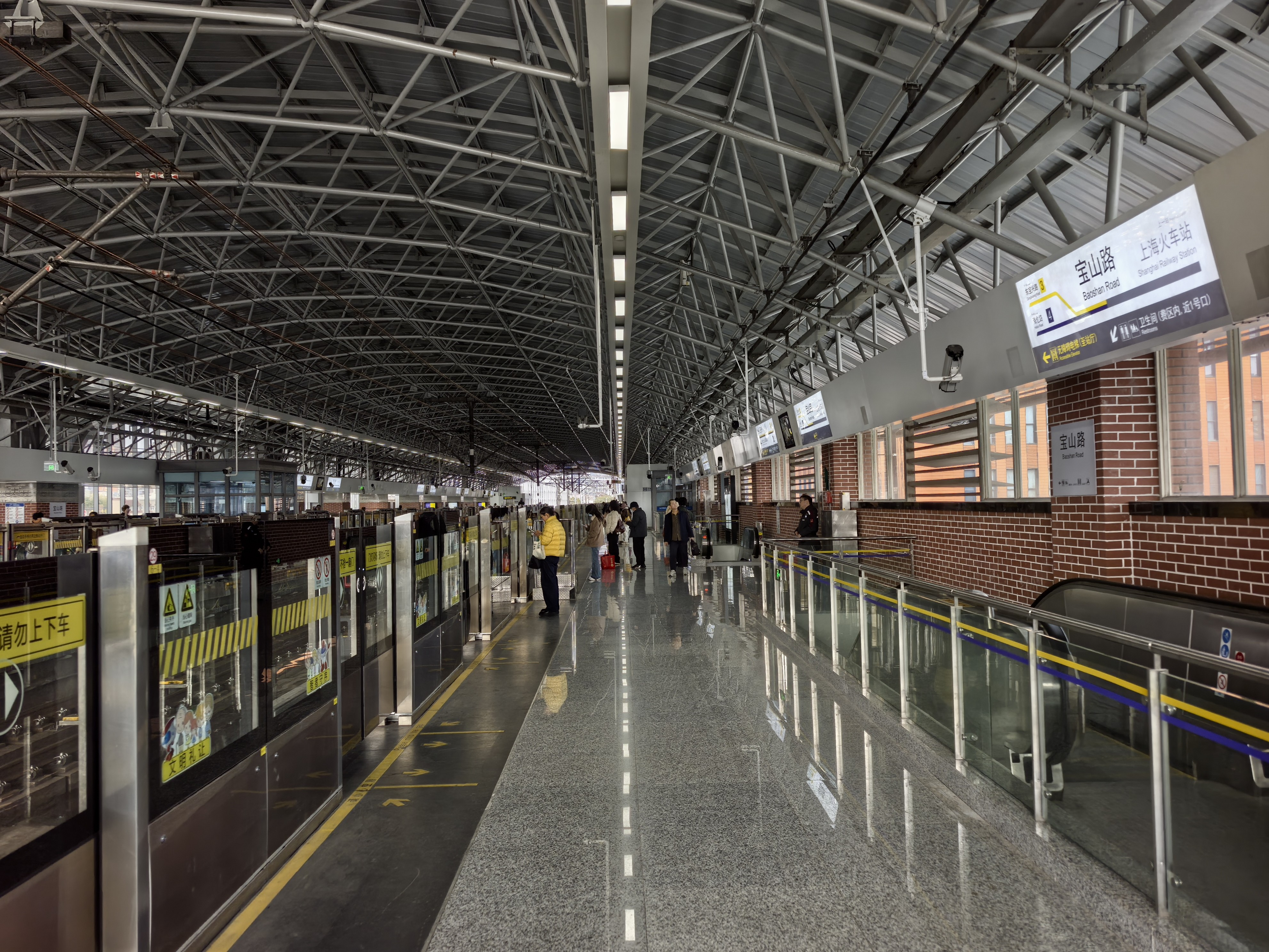
Platform 3 in February 2026

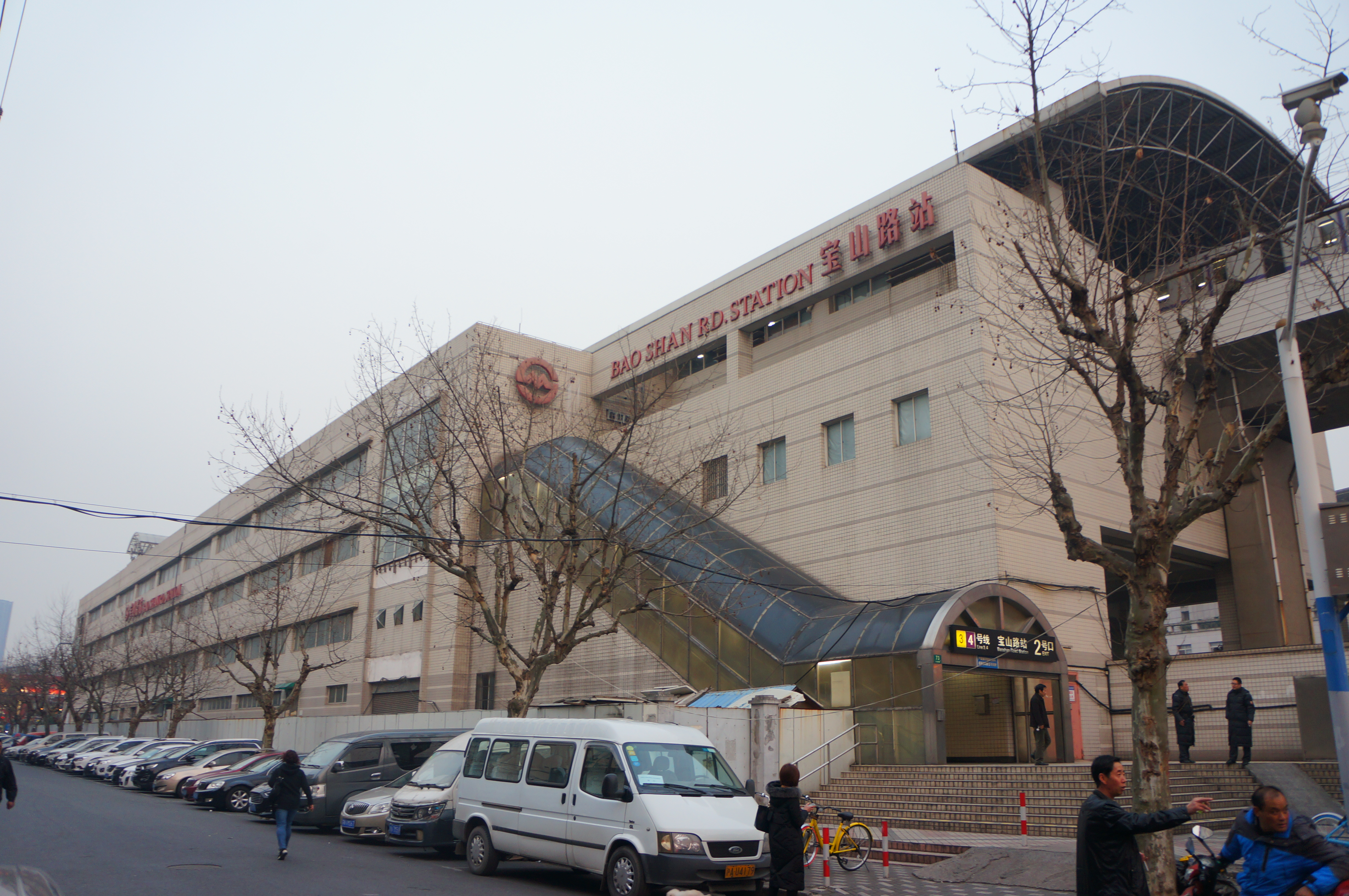
Exterior of exit 2 before renovation (2017)

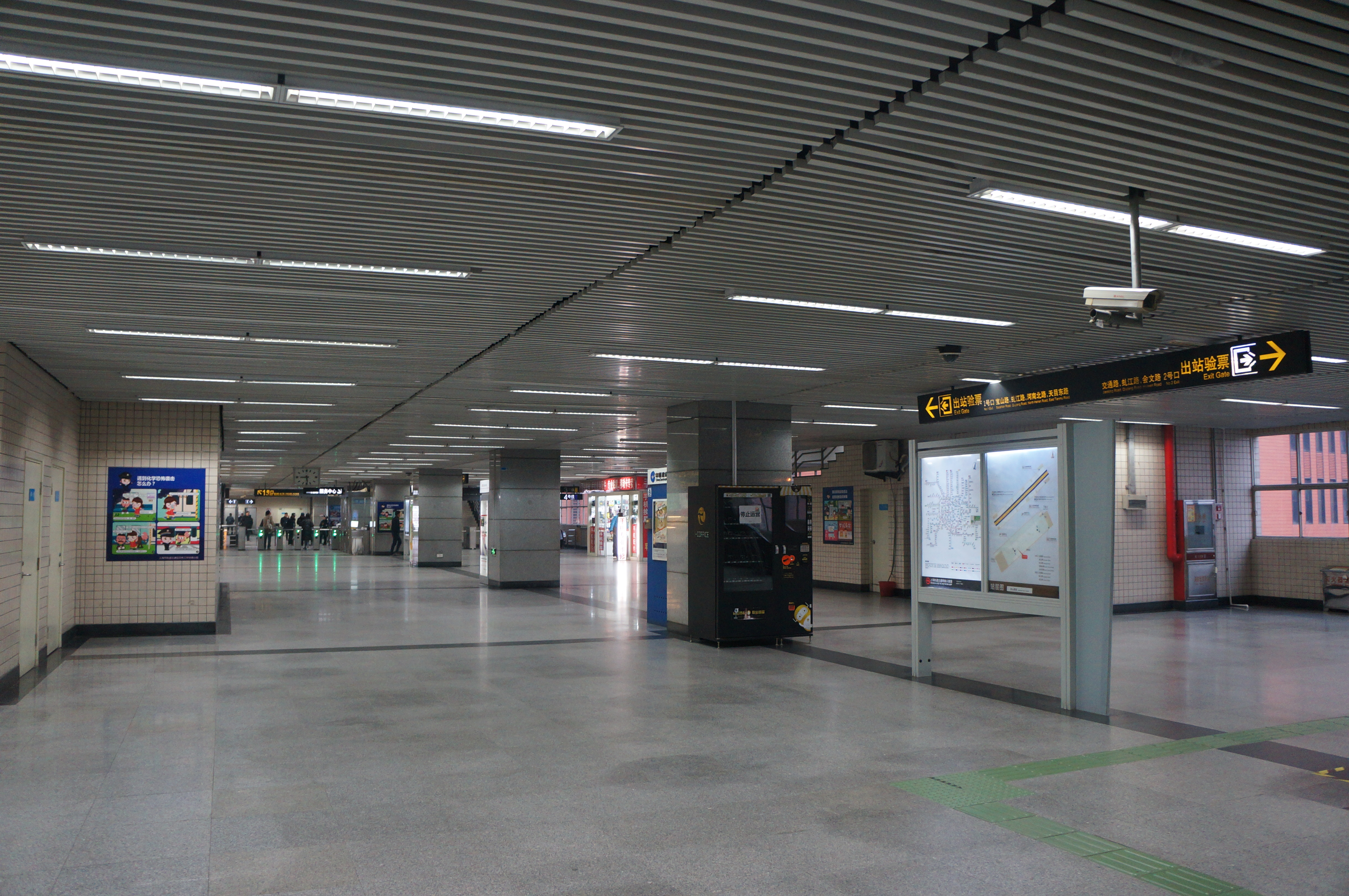
Station concourse before renovation (2017)

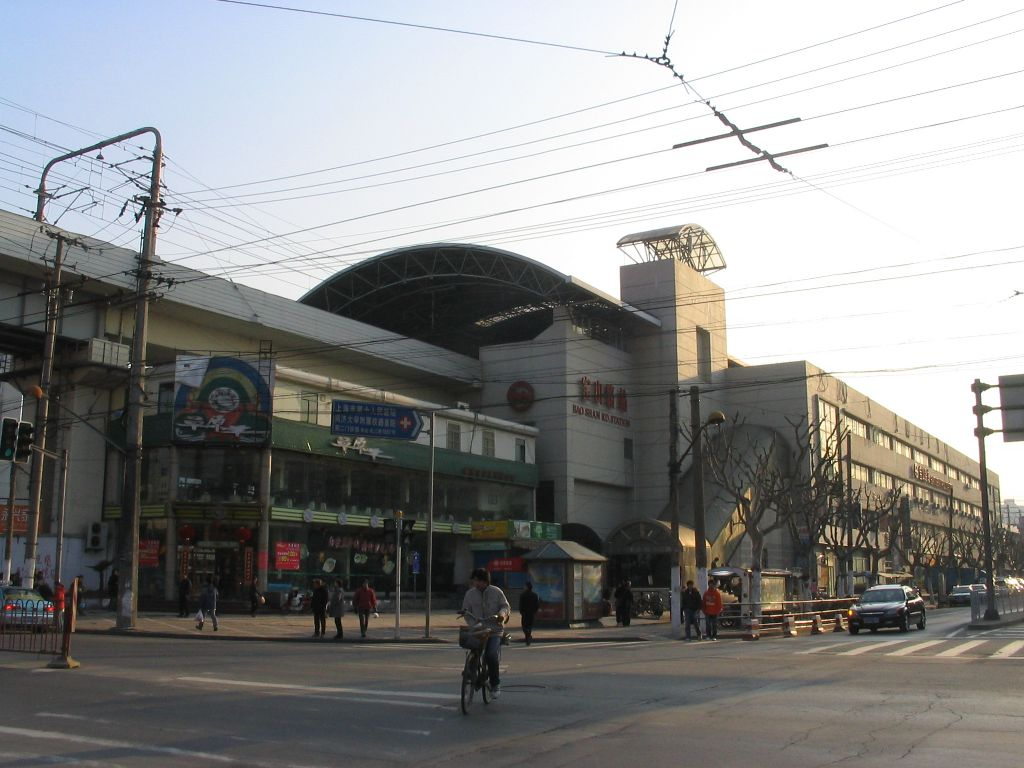
Station building before renovation (2007)

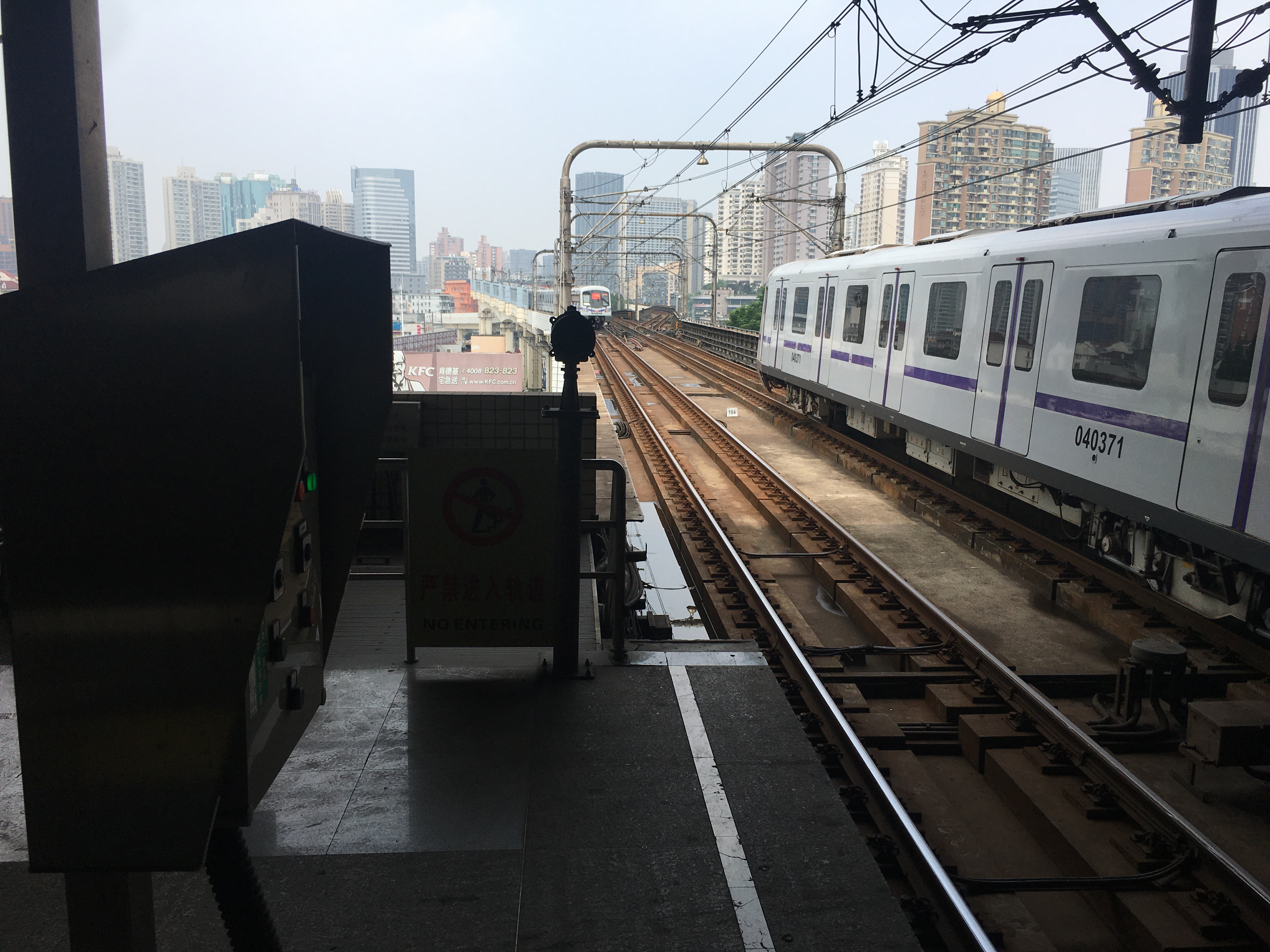
Tracks of Lines 3 and 4 on the east side of the station in 2019

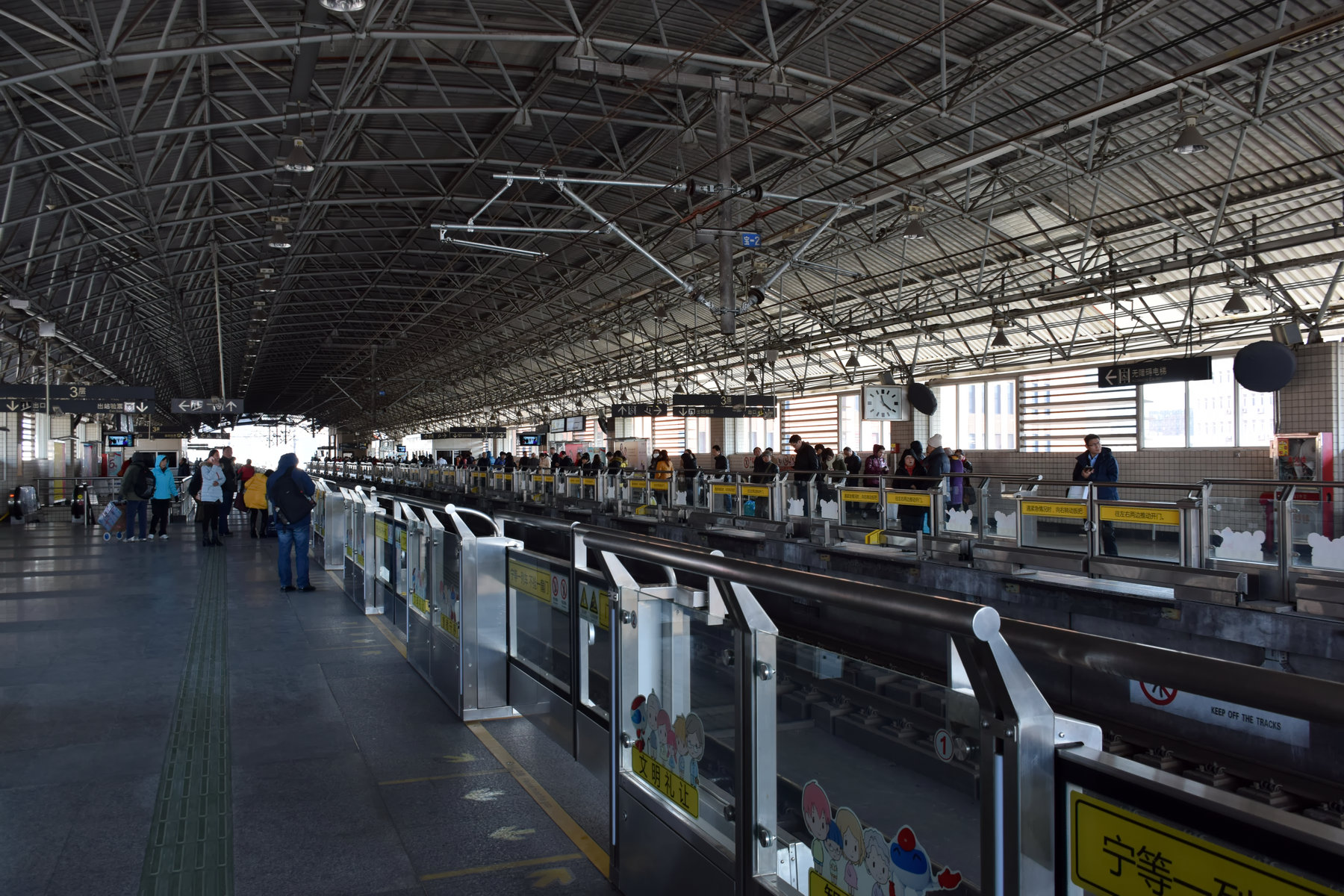
Station platforms before renovation (2016)

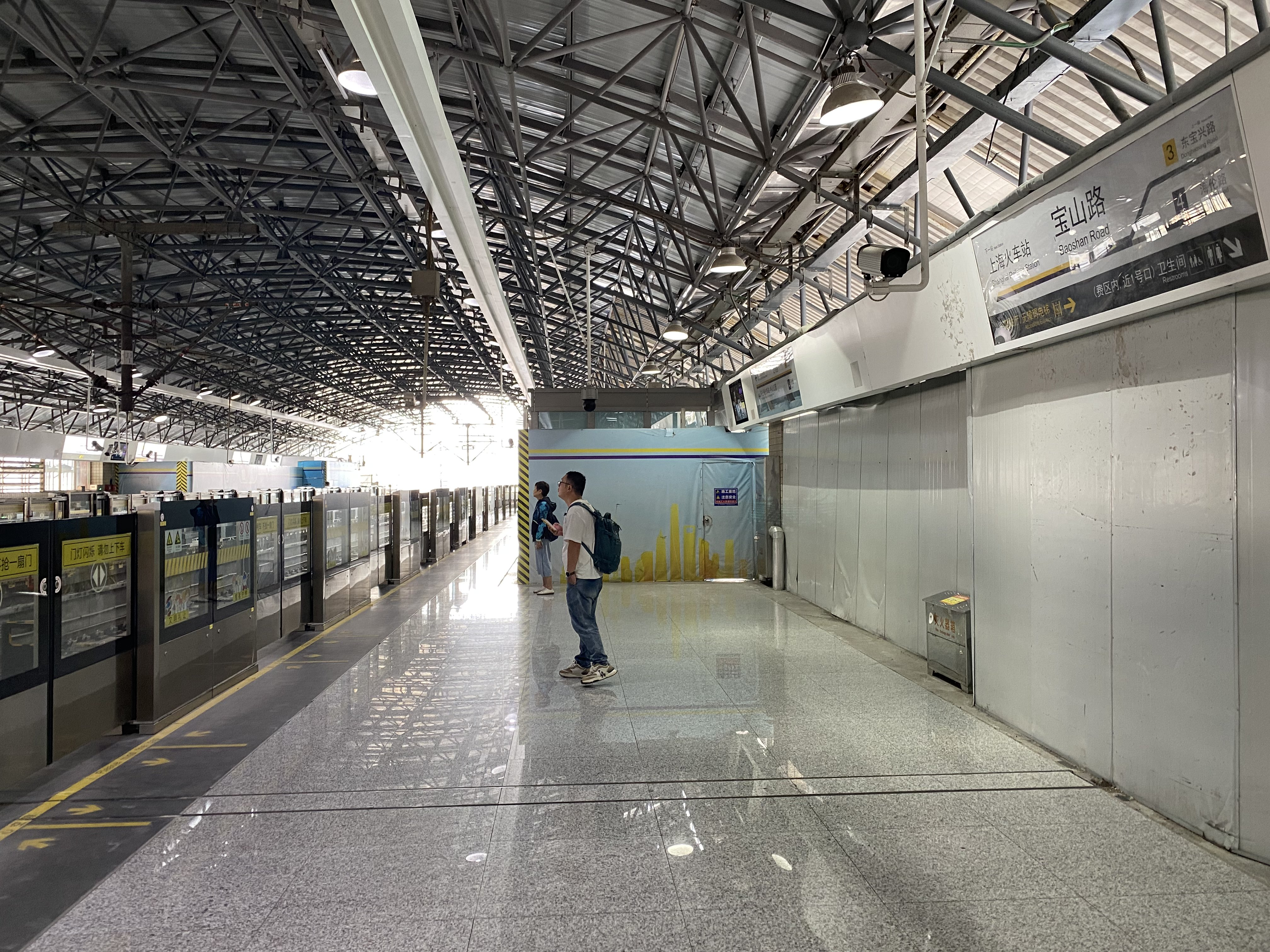
Platform expansion under construction (2025)

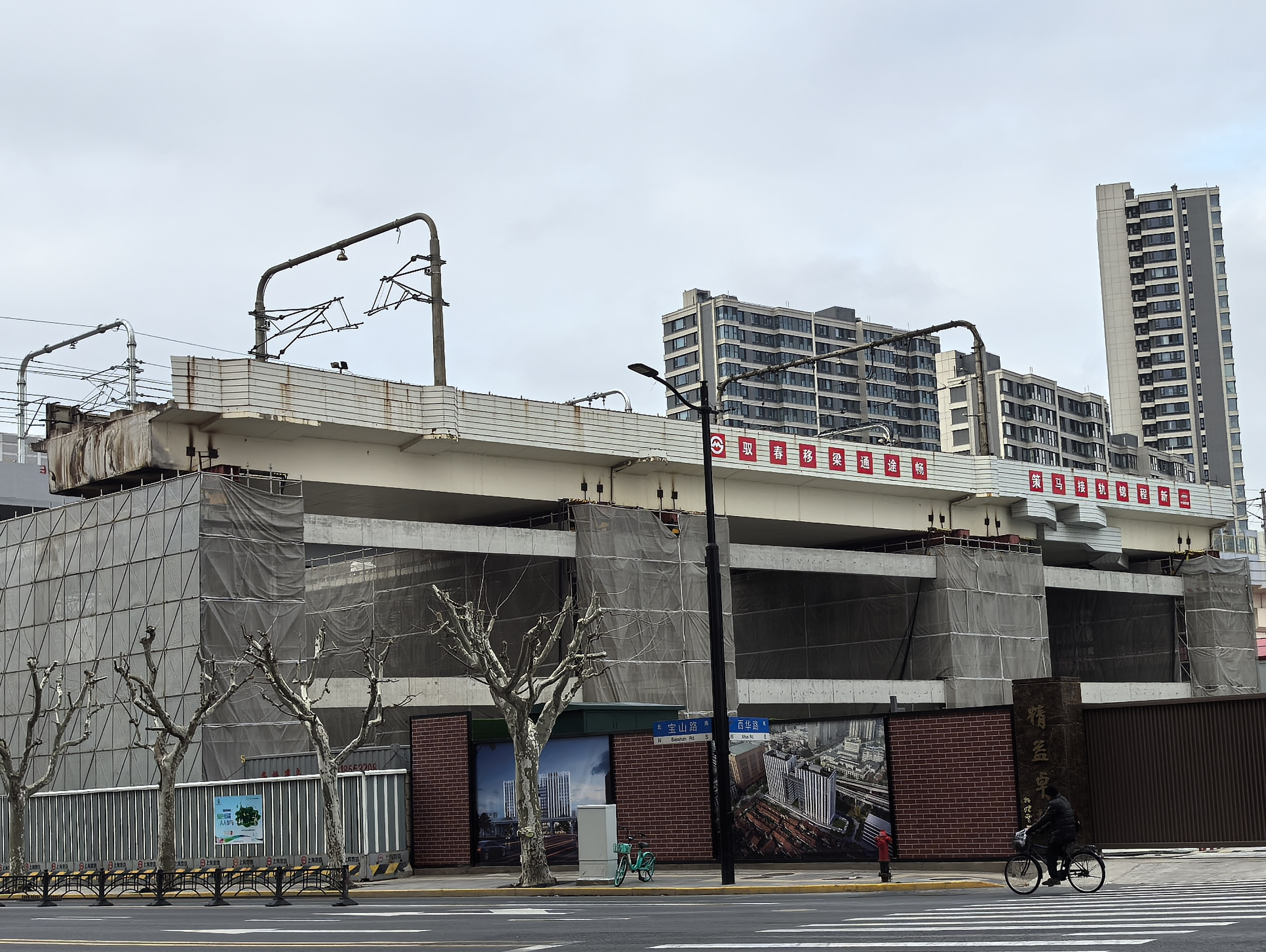
Tracks replaced during the expansion project

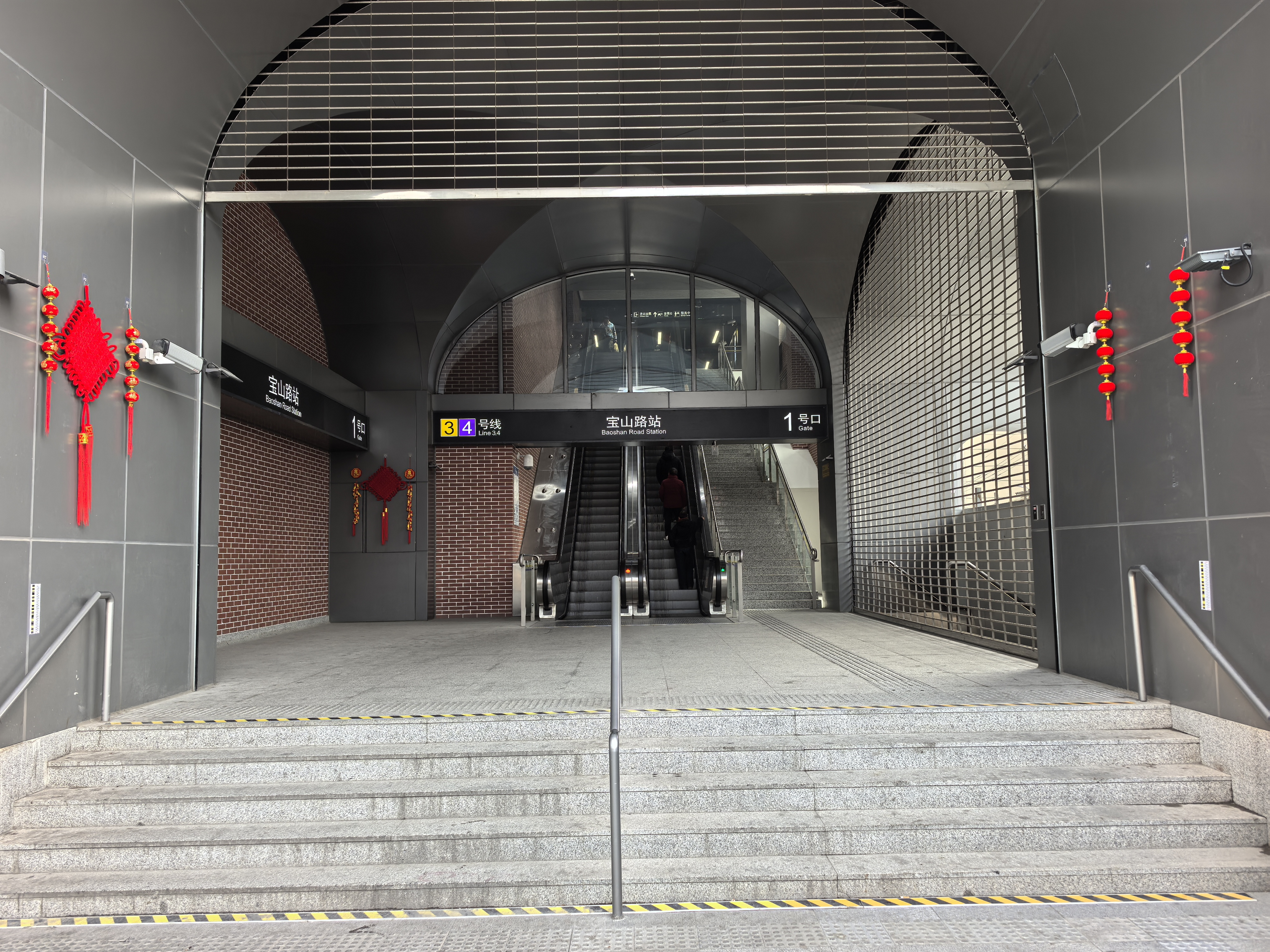
Exit 1 entrance in February 2026

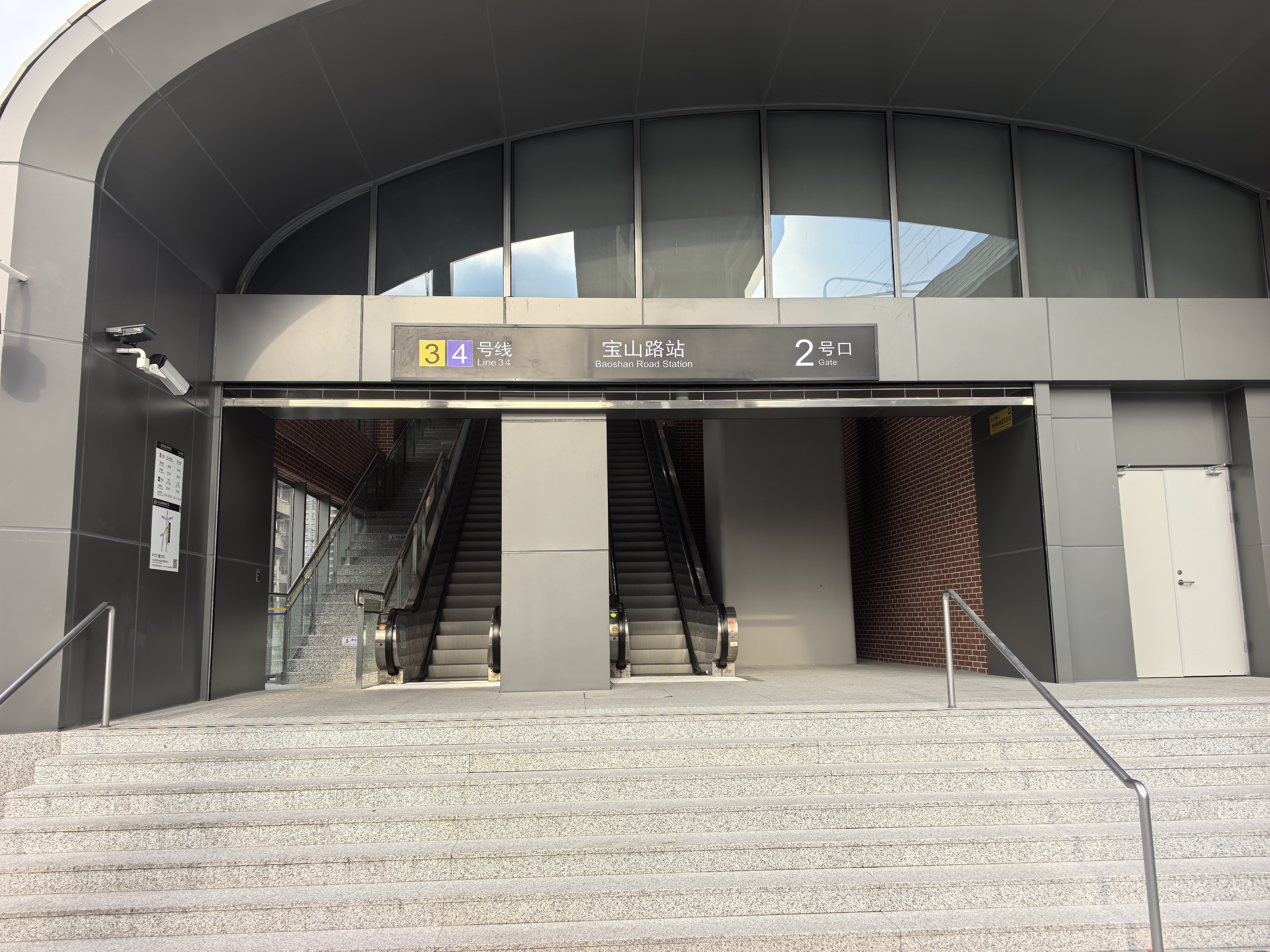
Exit 2 entrance in February 2026

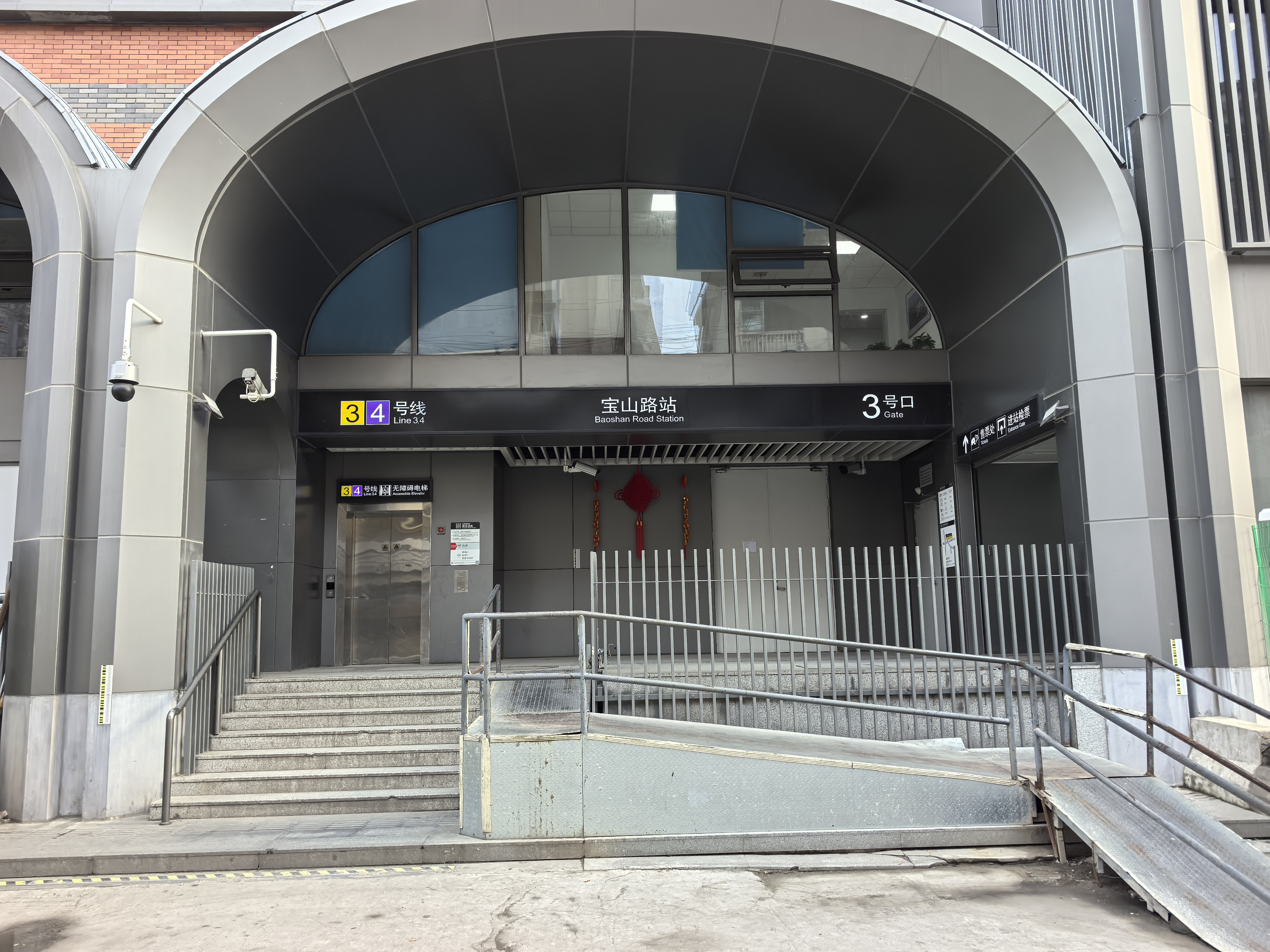
Exit 3 entrance in February 2026

== History ==
The station opened on 26 December 2000, coinciding with the opening of the initial section of Line 3, from Shanghai South Railway Station to Jiangwan Town, and Line 4 service began here on the final day of 2005.

On the evening of 21 January 2016, a fire broke out in a restaurant outside Exit 1 of the station, which was close to the train tracks, but it did not affect the operation of the subway, and only smoke drifted in the station and trains.

There is a plan to solve capacity problems caused by the co-line operation of lines 3 and 4 by carrying out large-scale renovation of the section between this station and Shanghai Railway Station, along with separating the two lines. However, due to poor feasibility, this plan was cancelled in 2015, and the station was instead renovated and expanded.

Renovation and expansion of this station started on 20 July 2023. This include adding a new track on the north side and expanded the platform, set up a new turnout for the outer ring of Line 4 to connect to the downline of Line 3 behind the station on the west side, and removed the existing turnout of the outer ring of Line 4 to connect to the downline of Line 3 in front of the station on the east side. After the renovation, the station became an island-side platform. The renovation project was completed on 22 February 2026.

== Surrounding area ==
- Former site of Shanghai North railway station
  - Shanghai Locomotive and Rolling Stock Depot Baoshan Road Passenger Technical Station
  - Shanghai Railway Museum
- Shanghai Railway Bureau
