= Zhenping Road station =

Shanghai Metro interchange station

Zhenping Road 镇坪路
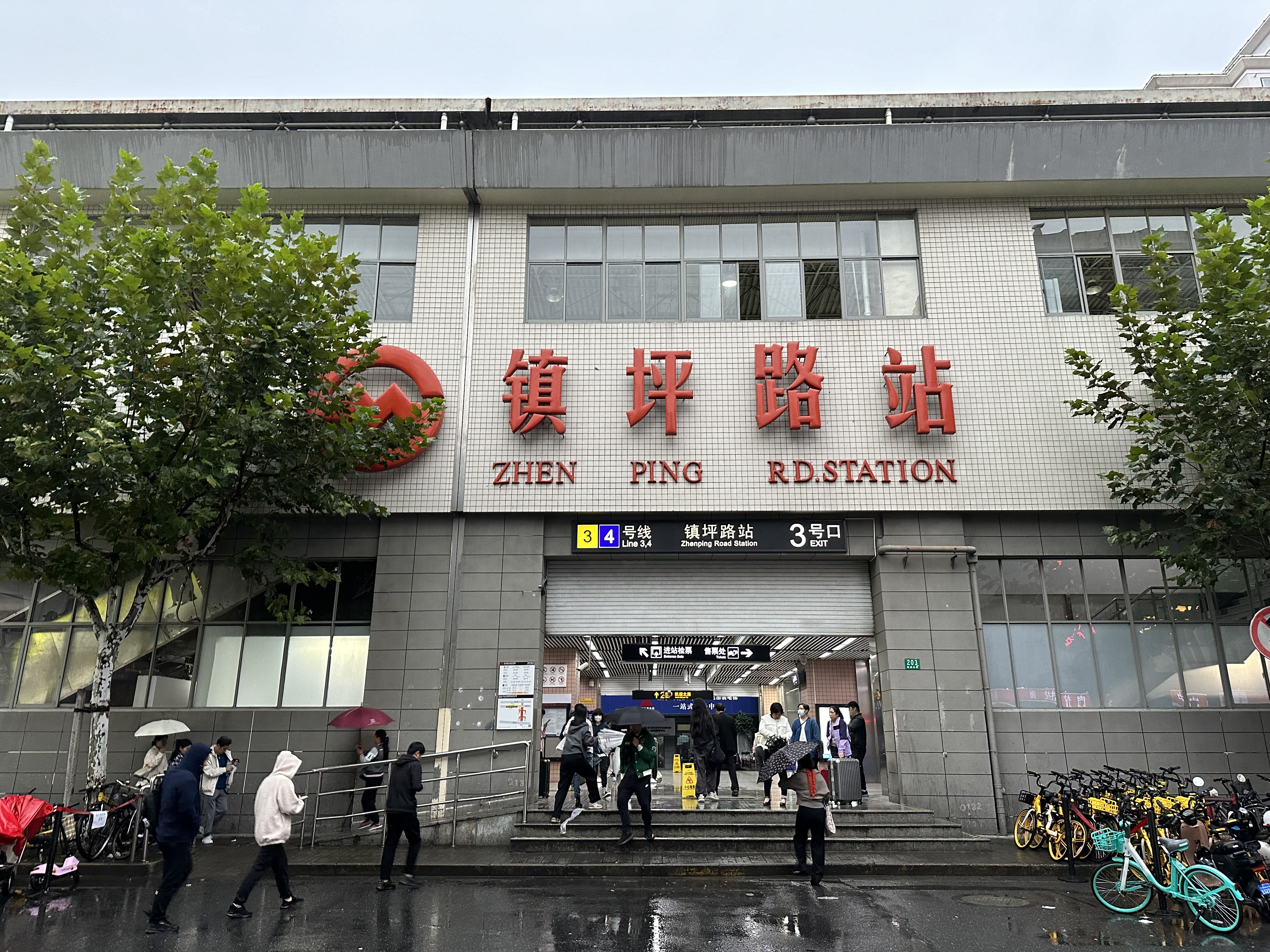
- Exit 3

General information
- Location: North Kaixuan Road (凯旋北路) and Zhenping Road; Putuo District, Shanghai; China
- Coordinates: 31°14′47″N 121°25′47″E
- Operator: Shanghai No. 3 Metro Operation Co. Ltd.
- Lines: Line 3; Line 4; Line 7
- Platforms: 4 (1 island platform for Line 7 and 2 side platforms for Lines 3 & 4)
- Tracks: 4

Construction
- Structure type: Elevated (Lines 3 & 4); Underground (Line 7)
- Accessible: Yes

History
- Opened: 26 December 2000; 25 years ago (Line 3); 31 December 2005; 20 years ago (Line 4); 5 December 2009; 16 years ago (Line 7)

Services
Preceding station	Shanghai Metro	Following station
Zhongtan Road towards North Jiangyang Road	Line 3	Caoyang Road towards Shanghai South Railway Station
Zhongtan Road Clockwise	Line 4	Caoyang Road Counter-clockwise
Langao Road towards Meilan Lake	Line 7	Changshou Road towards Huamu Road
Location
- Location within Shanghai

Zhenping Road (simplified Chinese: 镇坪路; traditional Chinese: 鎮坪路; pinyin: Zhènpíng Lù) is the name of an interchange station on the Shanghai Metro. It serves Lines 3, 4 and 7. The station typically handles 108,000 passengers on weekdays.

The station is located in Putuo District, Shanghai, and opened on 26 December 2000 as part of the initial section of Line 3 from Shanghai South Railway Station to Jiangwan Town, and Line 4 service began here on the final day of 2005. The interchange with Line 7 opened along with the first section of that line from Huamu Road to Shanghai University on 5 December 2009.

== Station Layout ==
2F	Side platform, doors open on the right
2F	Southbound/Counterclockwise	← Line 3 towards Shanghai South Railway Station (Caoyang Road) ← Line 4 to Caoyang Road
2F	Northbound/Clockwise	Line 3 towards North Jiangyang Road (Zhongtan Road) → Line 4 to Zhongtan Road →
2F	Side platform, doors open on the right
1F	Line 3/4 Concourse	Faregates, Station Agent
1F	Entrances and Exits	Exits 1-7
B1	Line 7 Concourse	Faregates, Station Agent
B2	Northbound	← Line 7 towards Meilan Lake (Langao Road)
B2	Island platform, doors will open on the left
B2	Southbound	Line 7 towards Huamu Road (Changshou Road) →

== Gallery ==
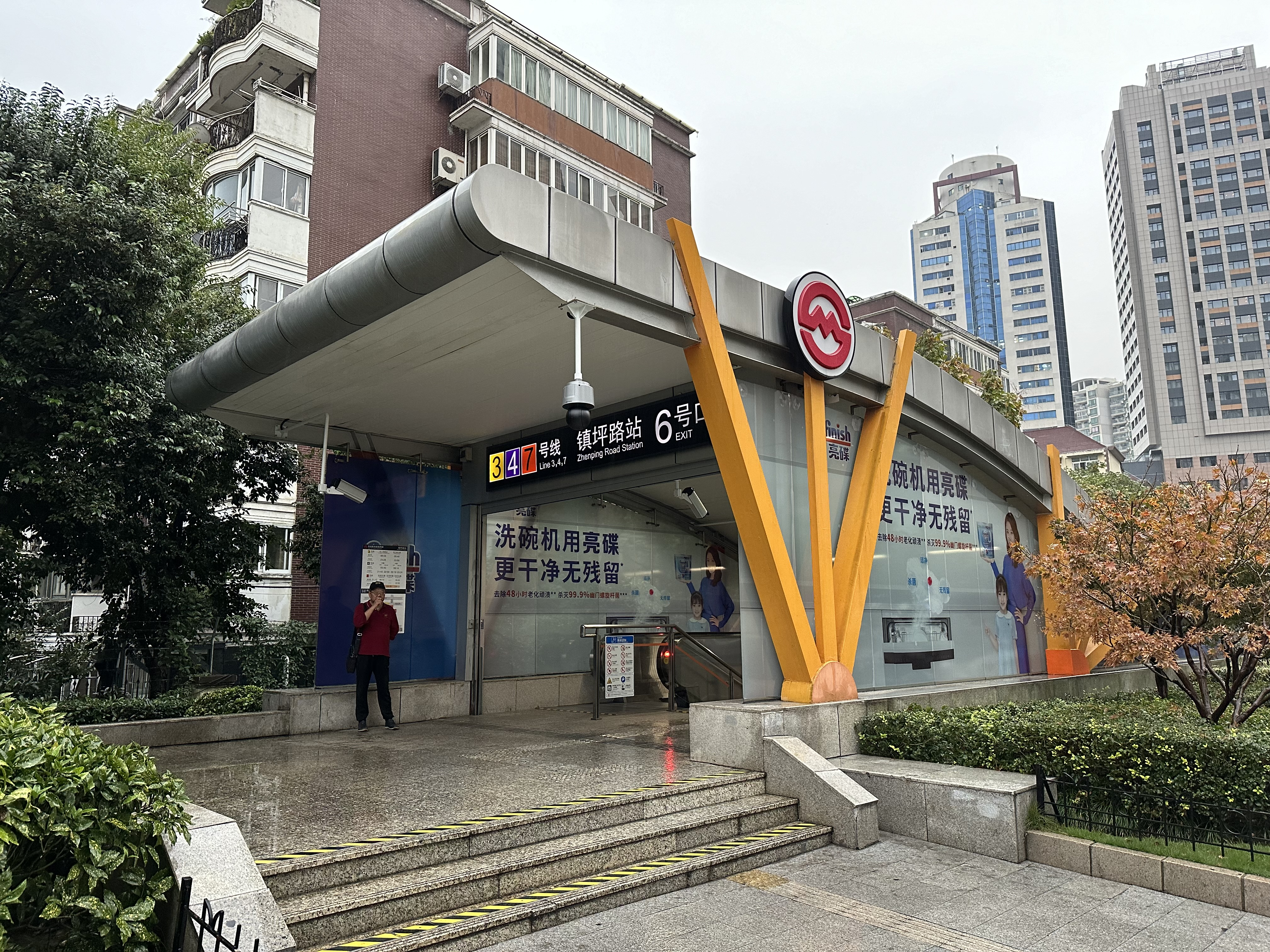
Exit 6

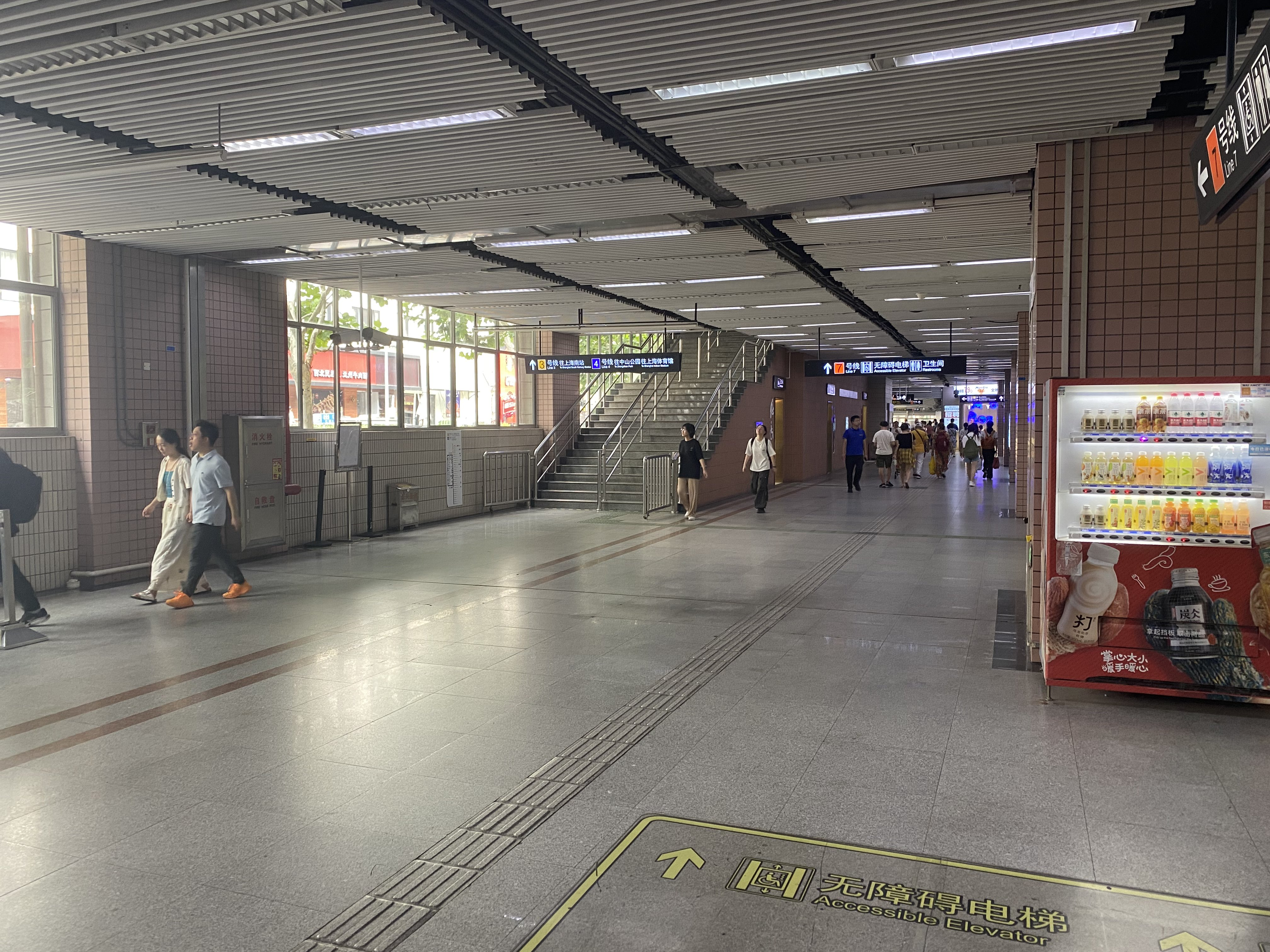
Concourse

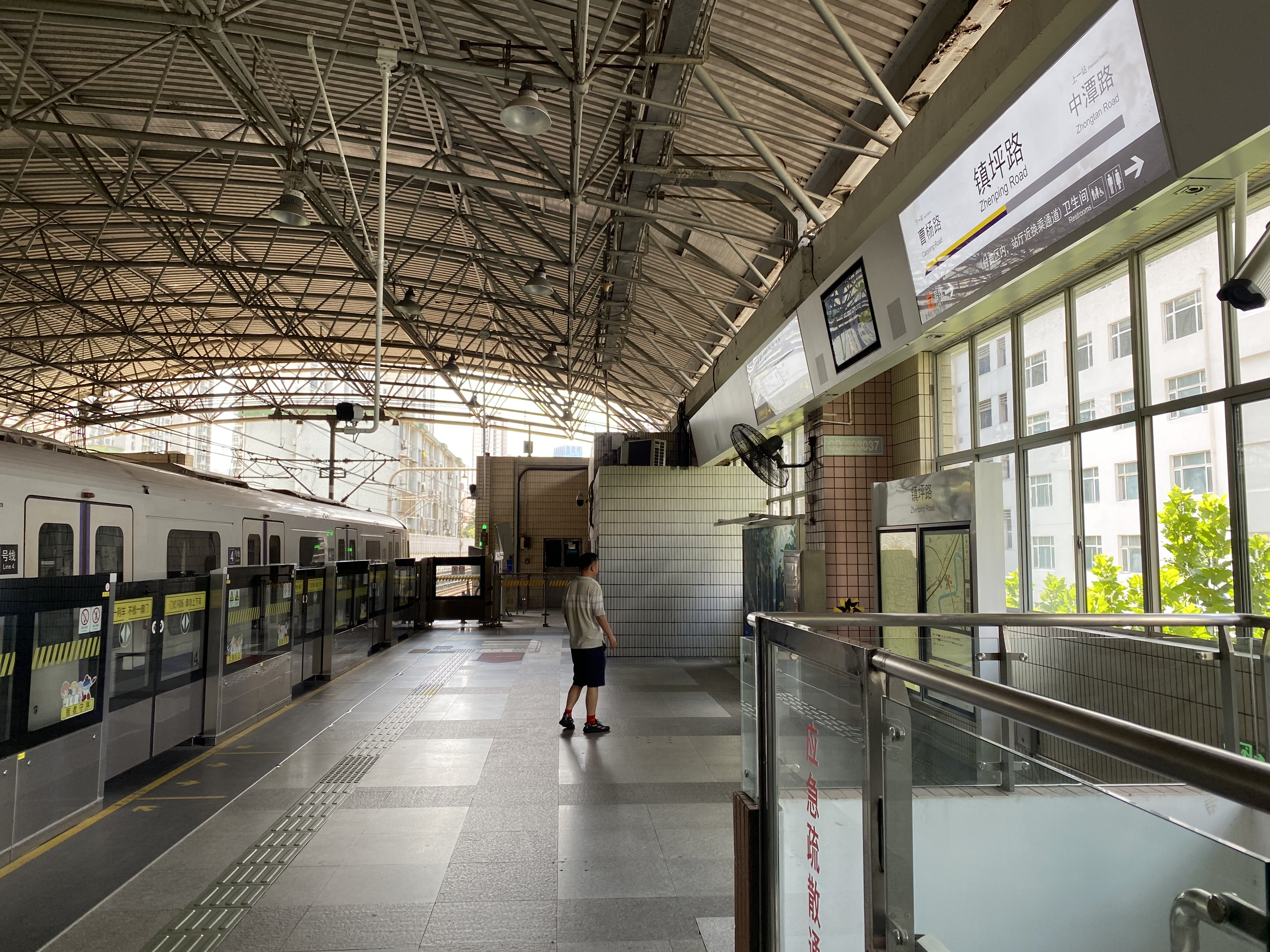
Line 3 and 4 platforms

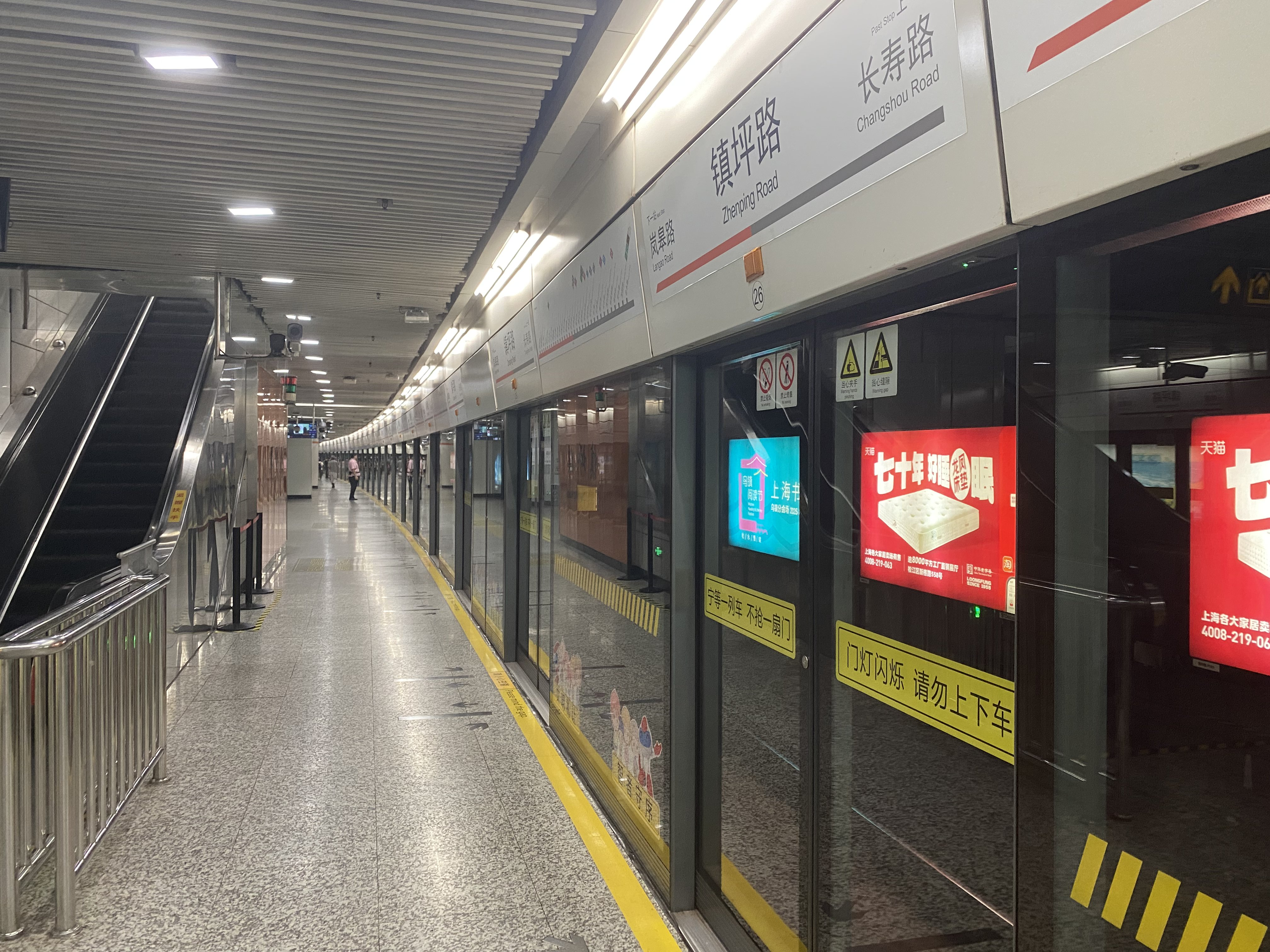
Line 7 platforms
