= Shanghai Metro Museum =

Transport museum in Shanghai, China

Shanghai Metro Museum (Chinese: 上海地铁博物馆; pinyin: Shànghǎi dìtiě bówù guǎn) is a transport museum about the Shanghai Metro, located near the Ziteng Road Station of a branch of the Shanghai Metro Line 10. The museum consists of 3,000 square meters. There are simulators, dioramas, and a 5D cinema. As a part of Shanghai Mixc TOD project, the museum is completed with Wuzhong Road Depot and OCC of Line 10. It is China's first metro museum.

From February to July 2026, the museum underwent a major refurbishment and added two additional rolling stock full-size mock-ups, 21A01 and 22A01. A partial-scrapped 01A01 car (94071) is preserved at outside of the museum since the refurbishment.

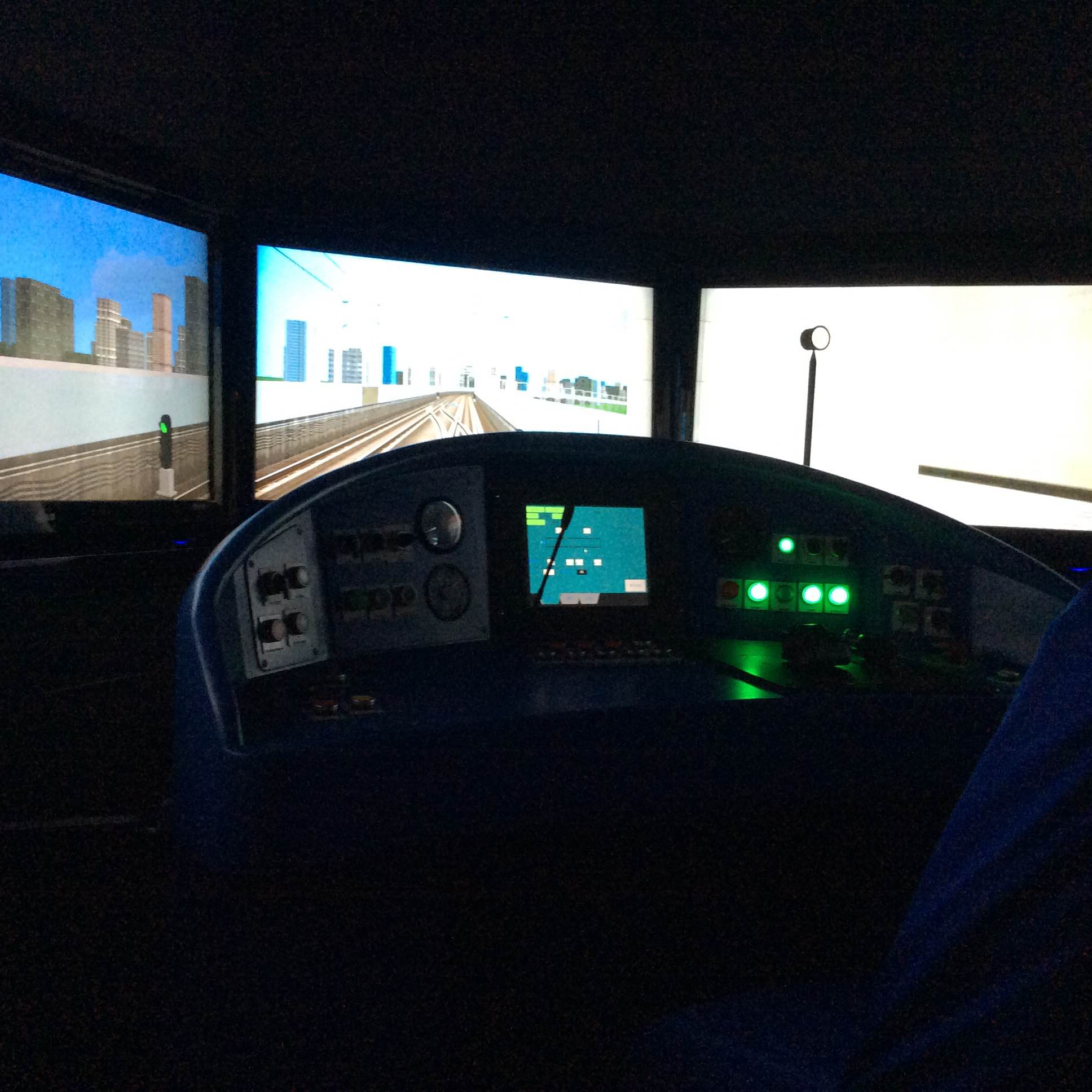
The simulator in the Shanghai Metro museum.

== Exhibits ==
The major exhibits in the museum are the metro simulator, dioramas, the walk through a mock-up subway tunnel, and a 5D cinema. There are over sixty items in the museum. The museum is currently collecting items from the public to expand its collection. In this way, the museum will find a better way of introducing the Shanghai Metro. The exhibits showcase the metro's past, present, and future.

- The First Line Hall has been dedicated to the first line. There are many items, such as tickets.
- The diorama shows what it looks like when Line 1 passes over Line 2. Inside it, there is a model of a pair of empty shoes. They are a memorial to the metro fatalities that happened before there were platform screen doors.
- The 5D cinema shows a display of what to do when the metro train catches fire in a station. It shows an imaginary movie of starting on a metro track, a person will go through rock walls and battle dangerous animals and end up in a Shanghai sky city. The chairs will move and the viewer wears special glasses.
- The simulator is a simulator of driving the Shanghai Metro train. If a participant exceeds 80 km/h, the simulator will activate the emergency stop. If this happens, the participant will have to press a restart button to accelerate. There is a working horn.
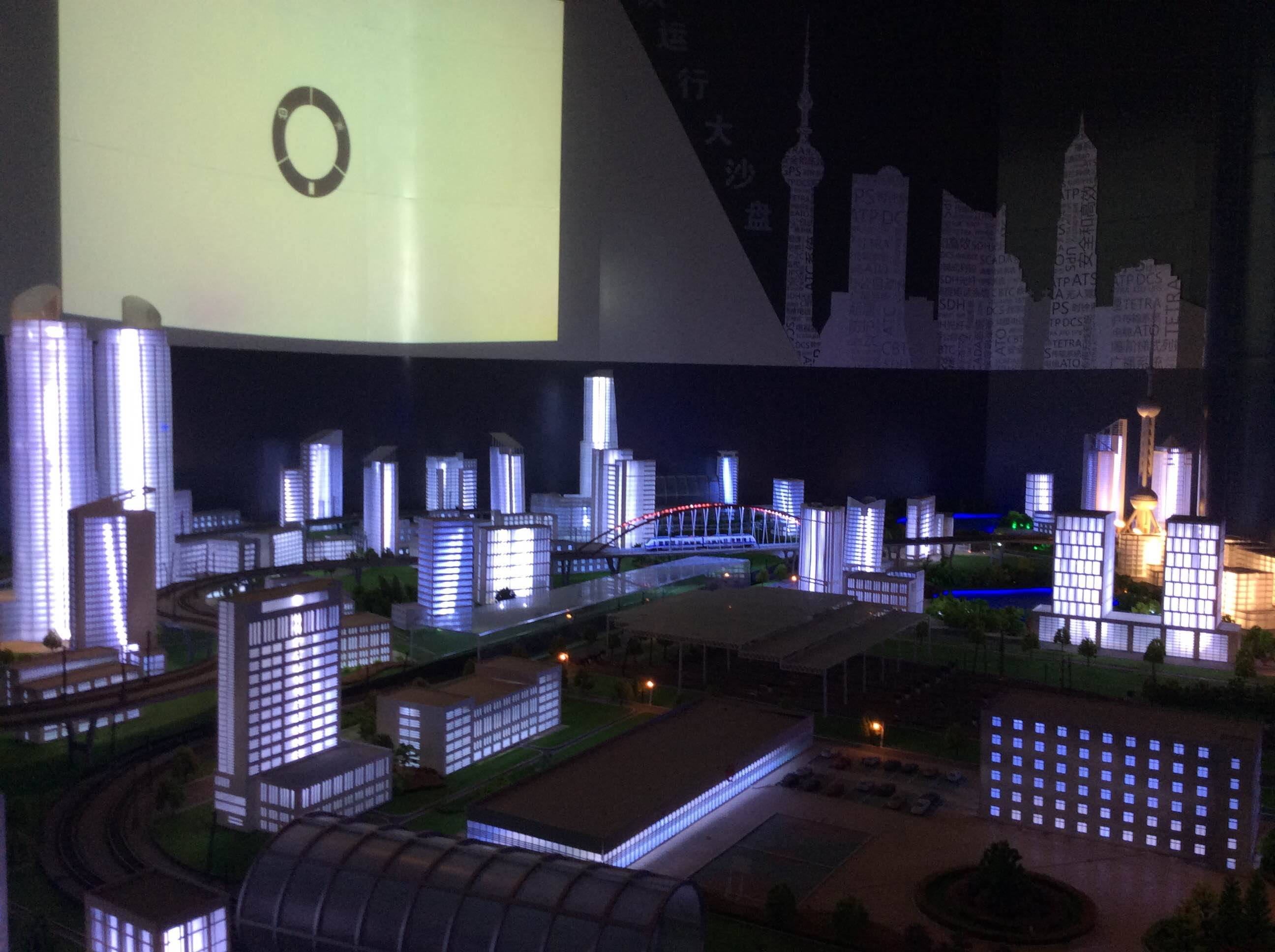
- The working model of line 4.
  There is a working model of Line 4 in the museum. It is not very accurate because the train is above ground and it never passes under the Huangpu River.
- The interactive touch screen game is a game to touch all dangerous items on transportation devices. There is also one where participants find subway stations. In another one viewers create a subway car with a body, pantograph etc.
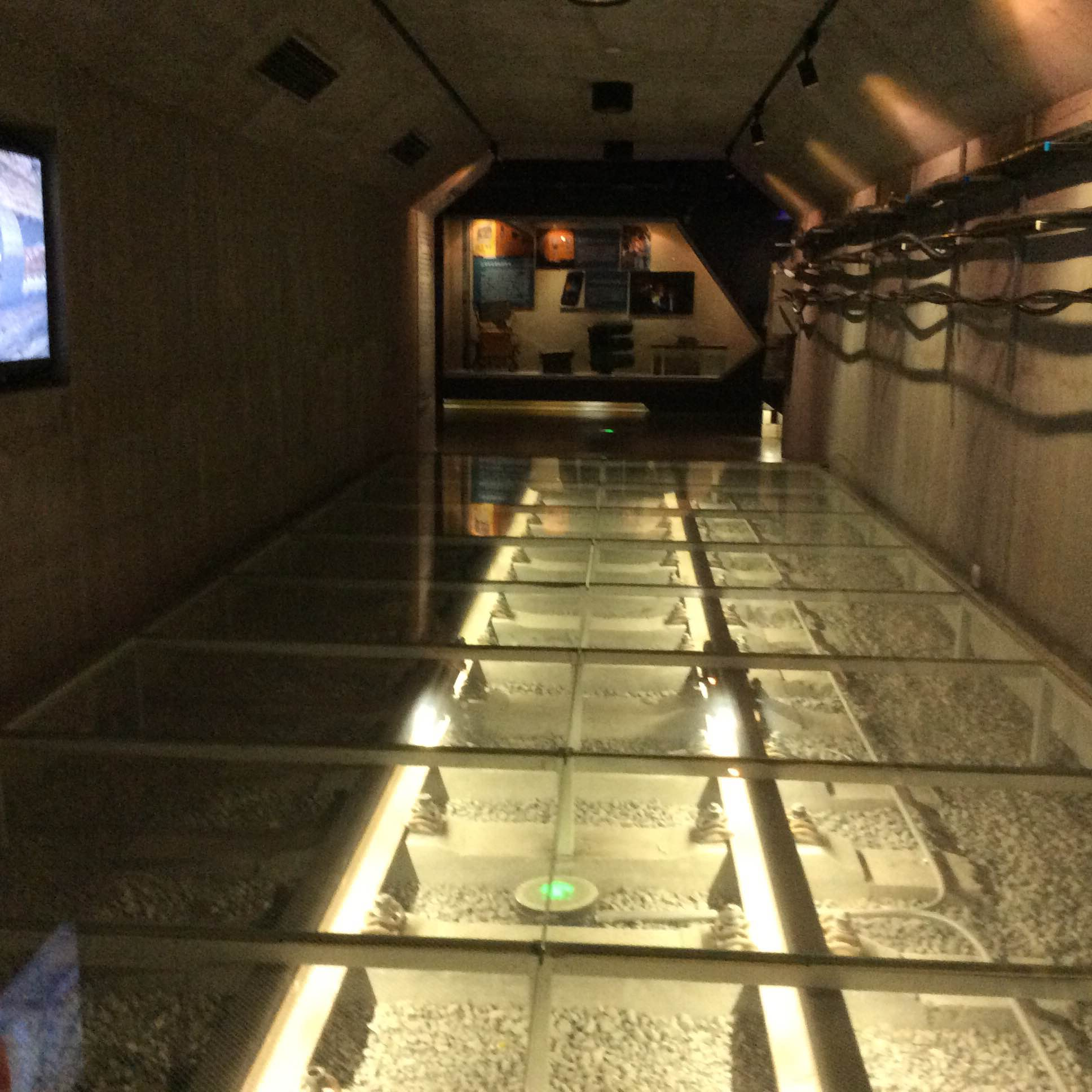
- The mock-up of the metro tunnel.
  This museum gives visitors an experience to walk through a mock-up tunnel. The floors are glass with mock-up rails under it. There is also a small model of a tunnel boring machine that is used to excavate metro tunnels.
- There are drawings of transport disasters in the hall of the museum.
- There are exhibits that show how the SMT Shanghai Maglev works.
- There is a sandbox that shows live train operation and signals in the museum. It is large.
- There are also five screens that let viewers see live train operation.

== Gift Shop ==
There is a gift shop inside the museum. There are Shanghai Metro Mascot Chang Chang pillows, Shanghai Metro map umbrellas, carpets, soft toys, pencil cases, and caps.

== Location ==
The museum is located at No. 1779 of Wuzhong Road, near Ziteng Road, Minhang district. Connected with Metro Line 10 Ziteng Road station. The museum is built over Wuzhong Road Depot.

== Gallery ==
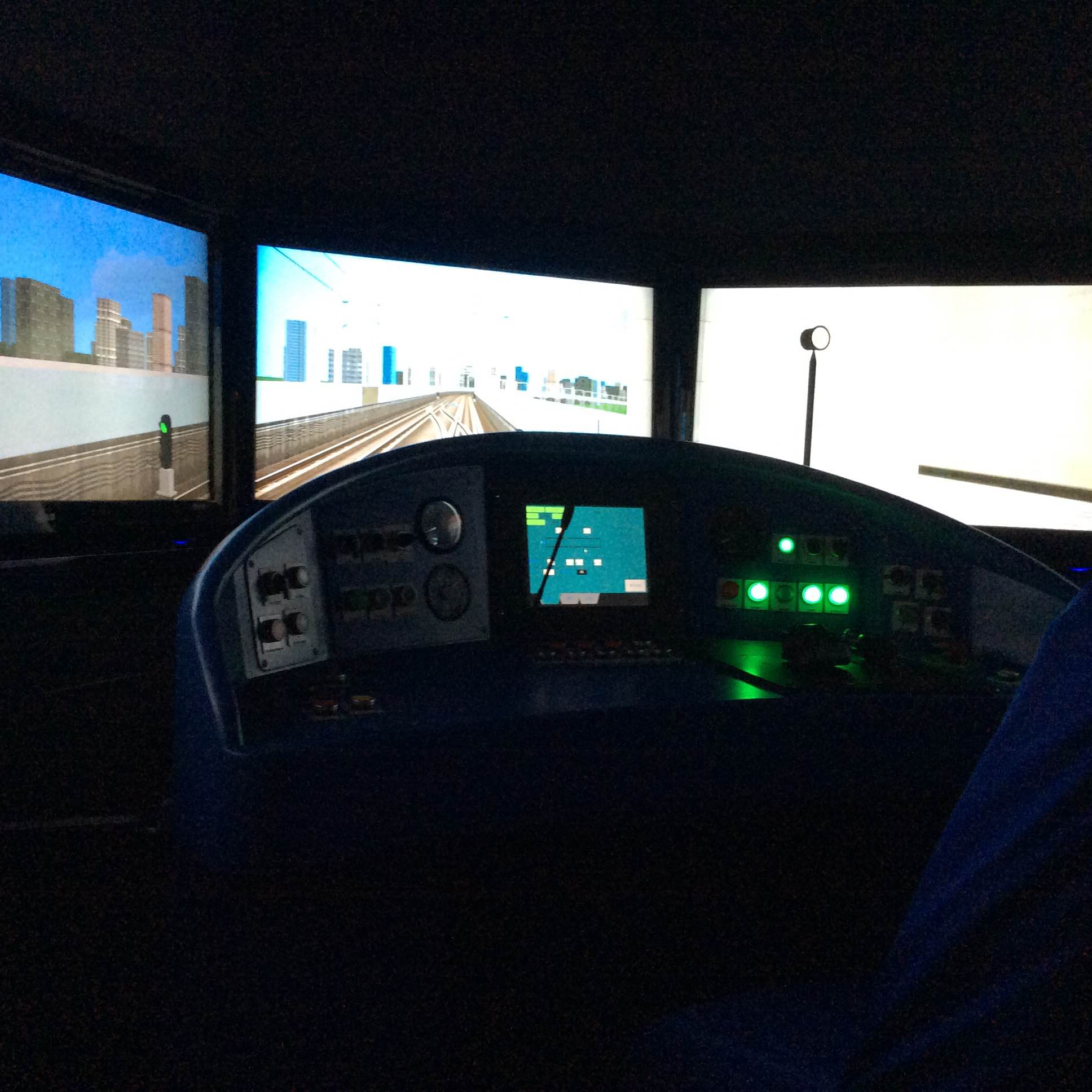
The simulator in the museum.

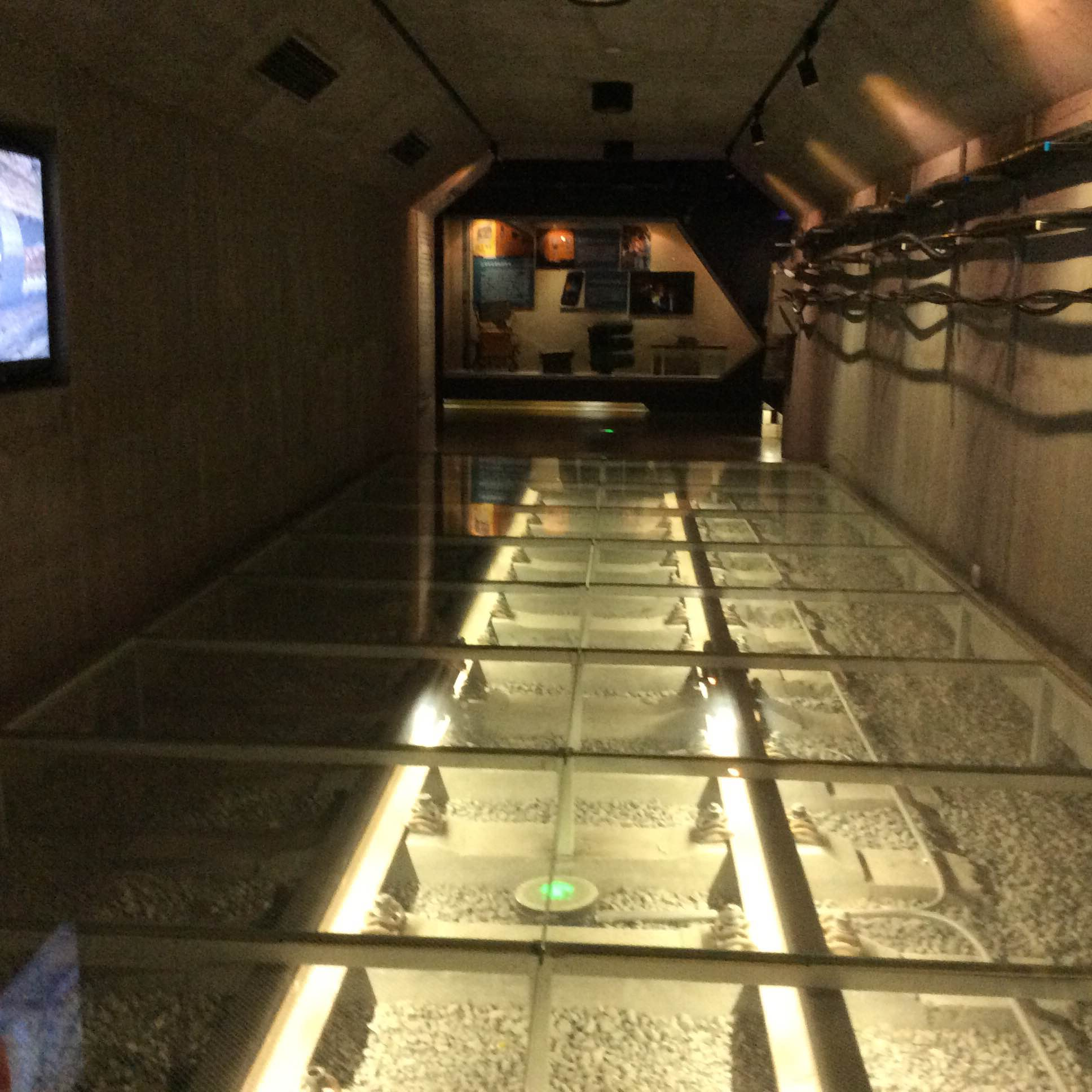
The mock-up tunnel in the museum.

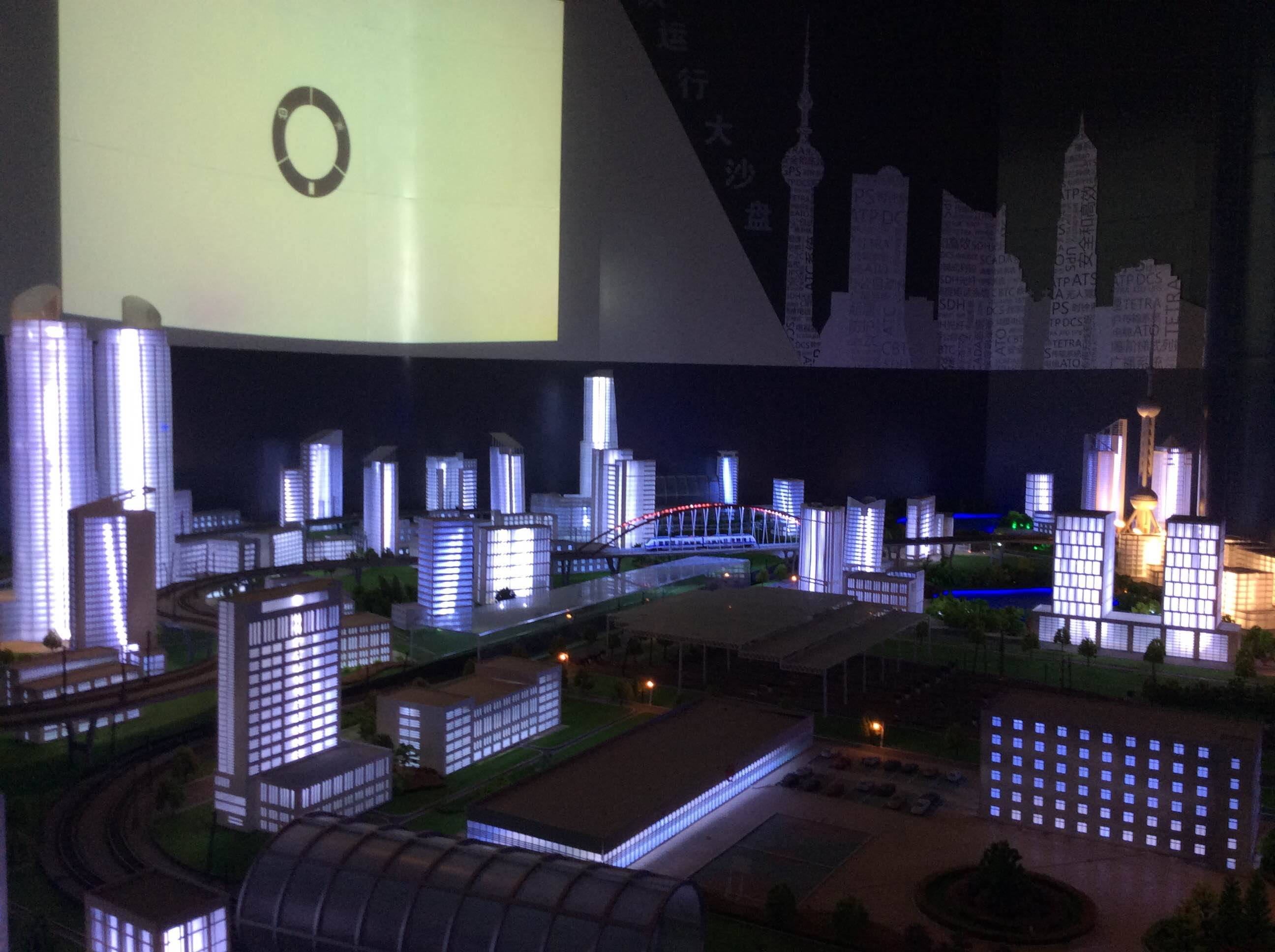
The working model of line 4.

== See also ==
- Shanghai Railway Museum
- Shanghai maglev museum
