= Zhongtan Road station =

Shanghai Metro station

Zhongtan Road 中潭路
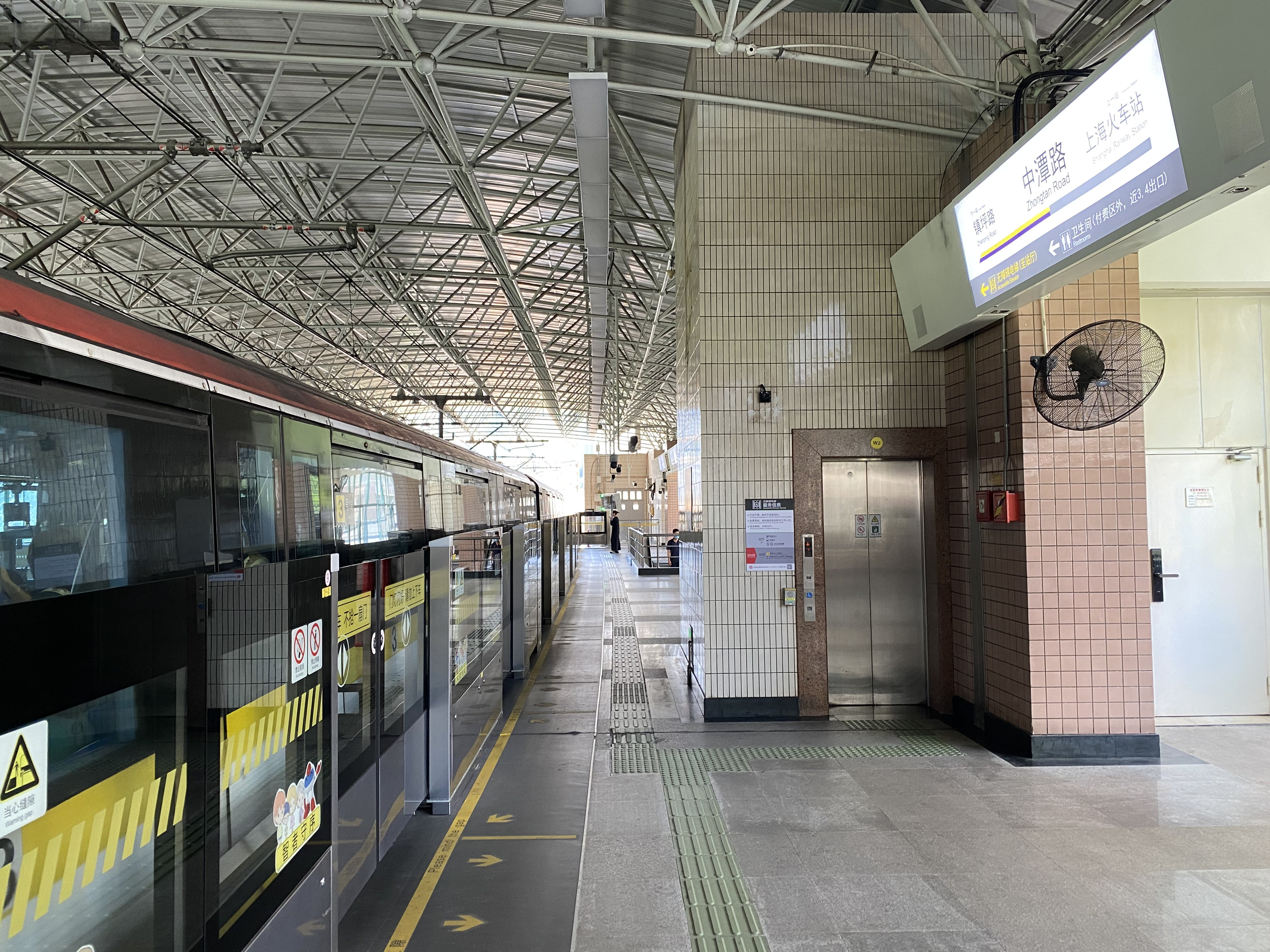
- Station platform

General information
- Location: Yuanjing Road (远景路) and Zhongtan Road; Putuo District, Shanghai; China
- Coordinates: 31°15′16″N 121°26′26″E
- Operator: Shanghai No.3 Metro Operation Co. Ltd.
- Lines: Line 3; Line 4
- Platforms: 2 (2 side platforms)
- Tracks: 2

Construction
- Structure type: Elevated
- Accessible: Yes

History
- Opened: 26 December 2000; 25 years ago (Line 3); 31 December 2005; 20 years ago (Line 4)

Services
Preceding station	Shanghai Metro	Following station
Shanghai Railway Station towards North Jiangyang Road	Line 3	Zhenping Road towards Shanghai South Railway Station
Shanghai Railway Station Clockwise	Line 4	Zhenping Road Counter-clockwise
Location
- Location within Shanghai

Zhongtan Road (Chinese: 中潭路; pinyin: Zhōngtán Lù) is the name of a station on Shanghai Metro Line 3 and Line 4. It's near Tanziwan, a river Bay on Suzhou Creek.

The station opened on 26 December 2000 as part of the initial section of Line 3 from Shanghai South Railway Station to Jiangwan Town, and Line 4 service began here on the final day of 2005.
