= Shuichan Road station =

Shanghai Metro station

Shuichan Road 水产路
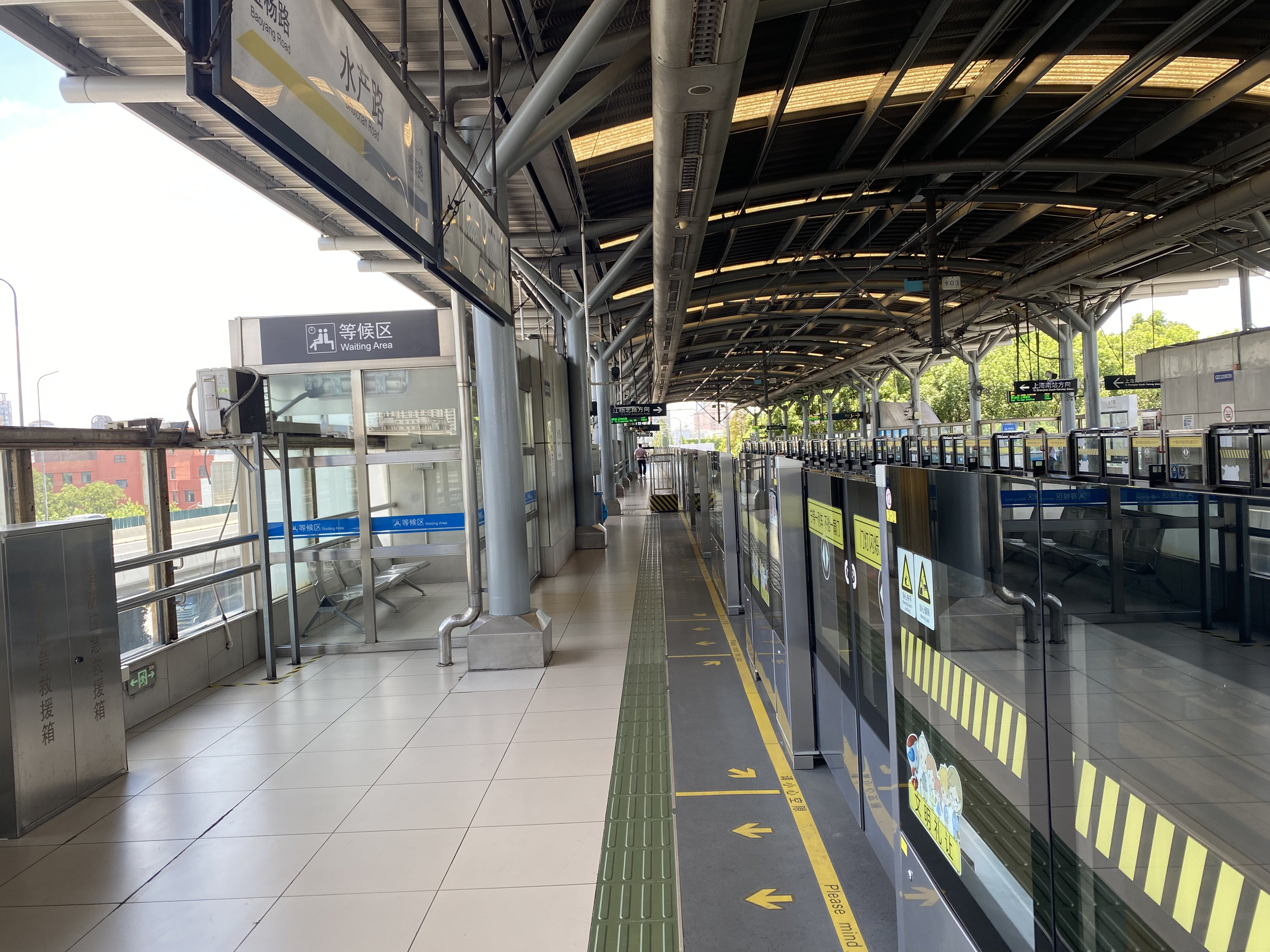
- Station platform

General information
- Location: Tongji Road (同济路) and Shuichan Road; Baoshan District, Shanghai; China
- Coordinates: 31°22′53″N 121°29′18″E
- Operator: Shanghai No. 3 Metro Operation Co. Ltd.
- Line: Line 3
- Platforms: 2 (2 side platforms)
- Tracks: 2

Construction
- Structure type: Elevated
- Accessible: Yes

History
- Opened: 18 December 2006; 19 years ago

Services
Preceding station	Shanghai Metro	Following station
Baoyang Road towards North Jiangyang Road	Line 3	Songbin Road towards Shanghai South Railway Station
Location
- Location within Shanghai

Shuichan Road (simplified Chinese: 水产路; traditional Chinese: 水產路; pinyin: Shuǐchǎn Lù) is the name of a station on the Shanghai Metro Line 3. It is part of the northern extension of that line from Jiangwan Town to North Jiangyang Road that opened on 18 December 2006.
