= Fengzhuang station =

Shanghai Metro station

Fengzhuang 丰庄
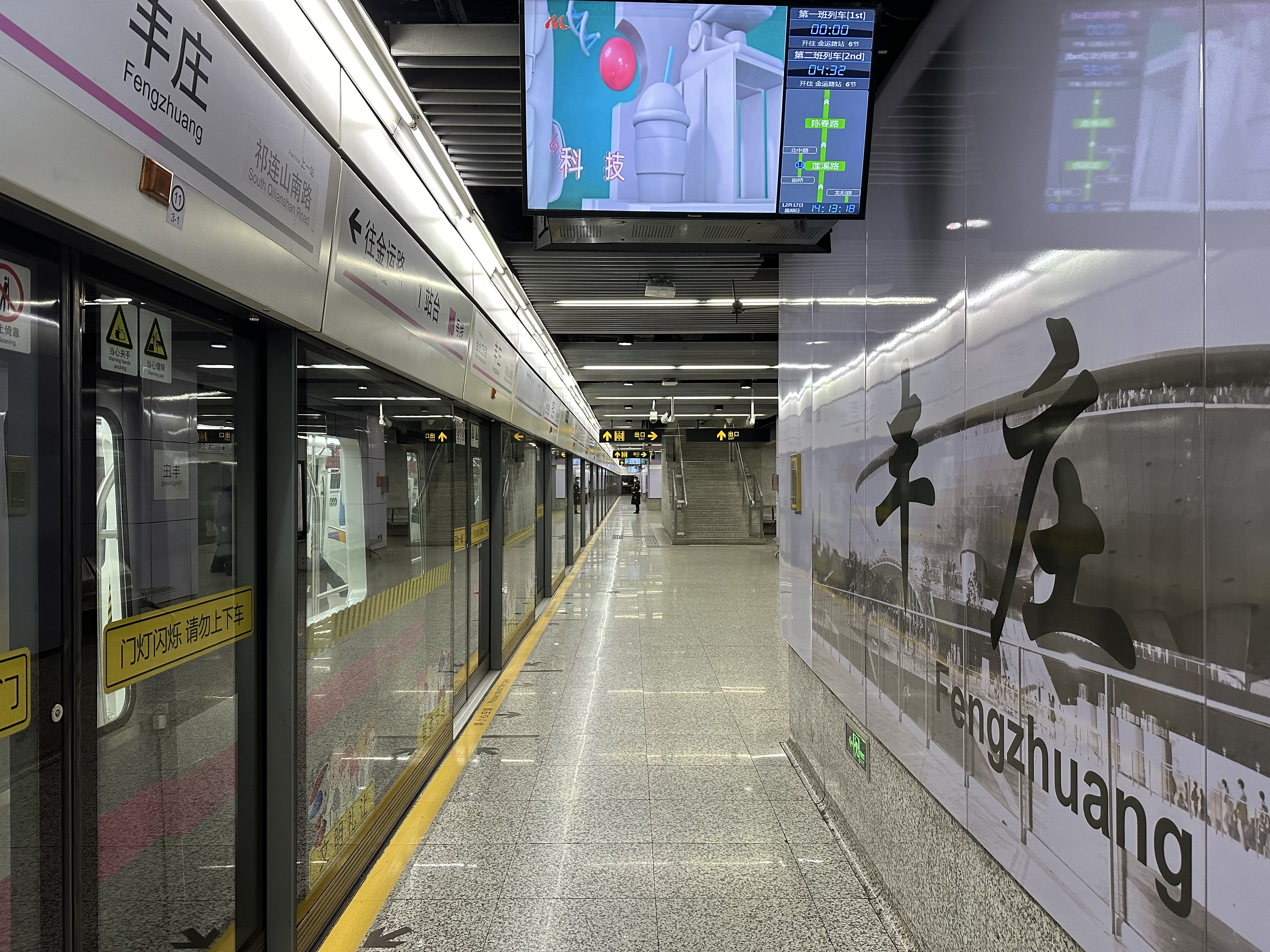
- Station platform

General information
- Location: Jinshajiang Road and Fengzhuang Road (丰庄路); Jiading District, Shanghai; China
- Coordinates: 31°14′36.41″N 121°21′3.77″E
- Operated by: Shanghai No. 2 Metro Operation Co., Ltd.
- Line: Line 13
- Platforms: 2 (1 island platform)
- Tracks: 2

Construction
- Structure type: Underground
- Accessible: Yes

History
- Opened: 30 December 2012

Services
Preceding station	Shanghai Metro	Following station
West Jinshajiang Road towards Jinyun Road	Line 13	South Qilianshan Road towards Zhangjiang Road
Location

Fengzhuang (simplified Chinese: 丰庄; traditional Chinese: 豐莊; pinyin: Fēngzhuāng) is a station on Line 13 of the Shanghai Metro. It is located in Jiading District, Shanghai.

On 30 December 2012, Line 13 began its test runs, providing service westbound towards Jinyun Road and eastbound to Jinshajiang Road. Although service did not include mobile or Wi-Fi signals, the metro did provide stops to five stations in Jiading District. South Qilianshan Road, an infill station, is the next station travelling eastbound towards Zhangjiang Road and was opened on 15 June 2013.
