= South Qilianshan Road station =

Shanghai Metro station

South Qilianshan Road 祁连山南路
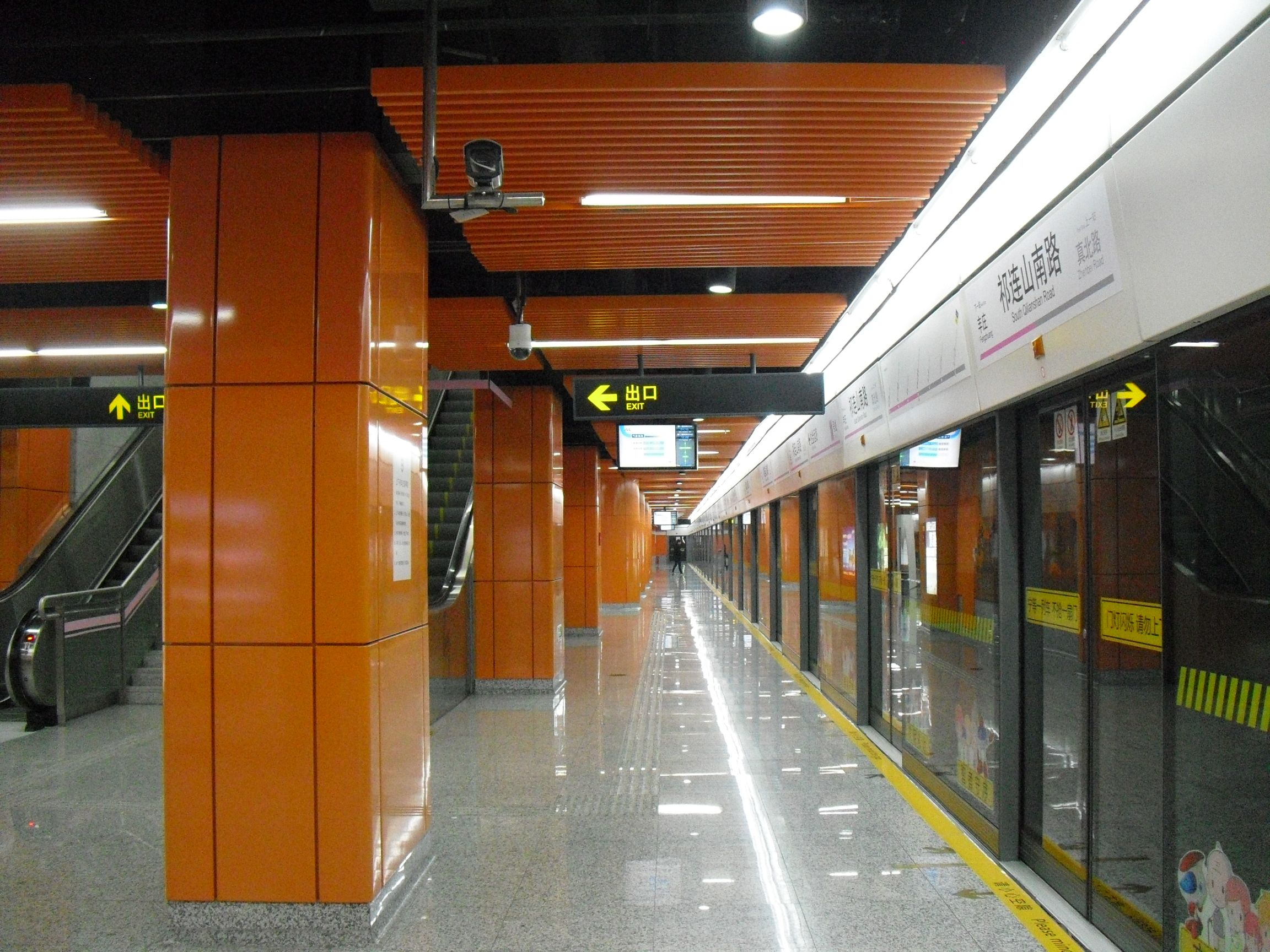
- Station platform

General information
- Location: Jinshajiang Road and South Qilianshan Road (祁连山南路); Changzheng, Putuo District, Shanghai; China
- Coordinates: 31.2395103°N 121.3627051°E
- Operated by: Shanghai No. 2 Metro Operation Co., Ltd.
- Line: Line 13
- Platforms: 2 (1 island platform)
- Tracks: 2

Construction
- Structure type: Underground
- Accessible: Yes

History
- Opened: 15 June 2013

Services
| Preceding station | Shanghai Metro | Following station |
|---|---|---|
| Fengzhuang towards Jinyun Road | Line 13 | Zhenbei Road towards Zhangjiang Road |
Location

South Qilianshan Road (simplified Chinese: 祁连山南路; traditional Chinese: 祁連山南路; pinyin: Qíliánshān Nán Lù) is a station on Line 13 of the Shanghai Metro. It is located in Putuo District, Shanghai.

On 30 December 2012, Line 13 began its test runs, providing service westbound towards Jinyun Road and eastbound to Jinshajiang Road. Although service did not include mobile or Wi-Fi signals, the metro did provide stops to five stations in Jiading District. However, this opening did not include the South Qilianshan Road or Daduhe Road stations which were located on that branch of the line. The South Qilianshan Road station opened on June 15, 2013.
