= Xia'nan Road station =

Metro station in Shanghai, China

Xia'nan Road 下南路
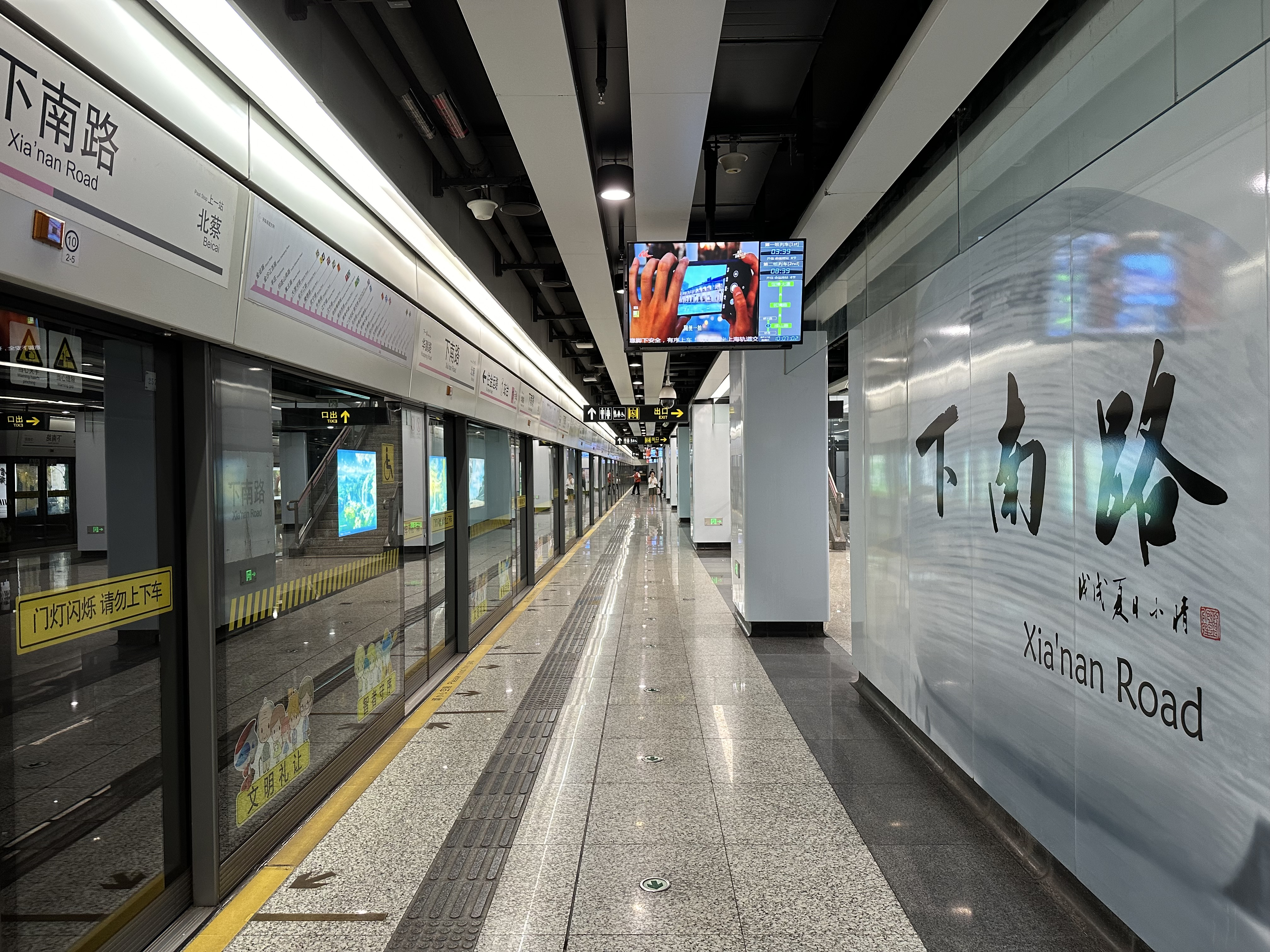
- Station Platform

General information
- Location: Chengshan Road and Jinxiu Road, Pudong New Area, Shanghai; China
- Coordinates: 31.18142°N 121.53621°E
- Operated by: Shanghai No. 2 Metro Operation Co. Ltd.
- Line: Line 13
- Platforms: 2 (1 island platform)
- Tracks: 2

Construction
- Structure type: Underground
- Accessible: Yes

History
- Opened: 30 December 2018

Services
Preceding station	Shanghai Metro	Following station
Huapeng Road towards Jinyun Road	Line 13	Beicai towards Zhangjiang Road
Location

Xia'nan Road (Chinese: 下南路; pinyin: Xiànán Lù) is a station on Line 13 of the Shanghai Metro, part of phase two of the line. Located at Chengshan Road and Jinxiu Road in the city's Pudong New Area, the station opened with the rest of phases two and three of Line 13 on 30 December 2018.
