= Zhongke Road station =

Metro station in Shanghai, China

Zhongke Road 中科路
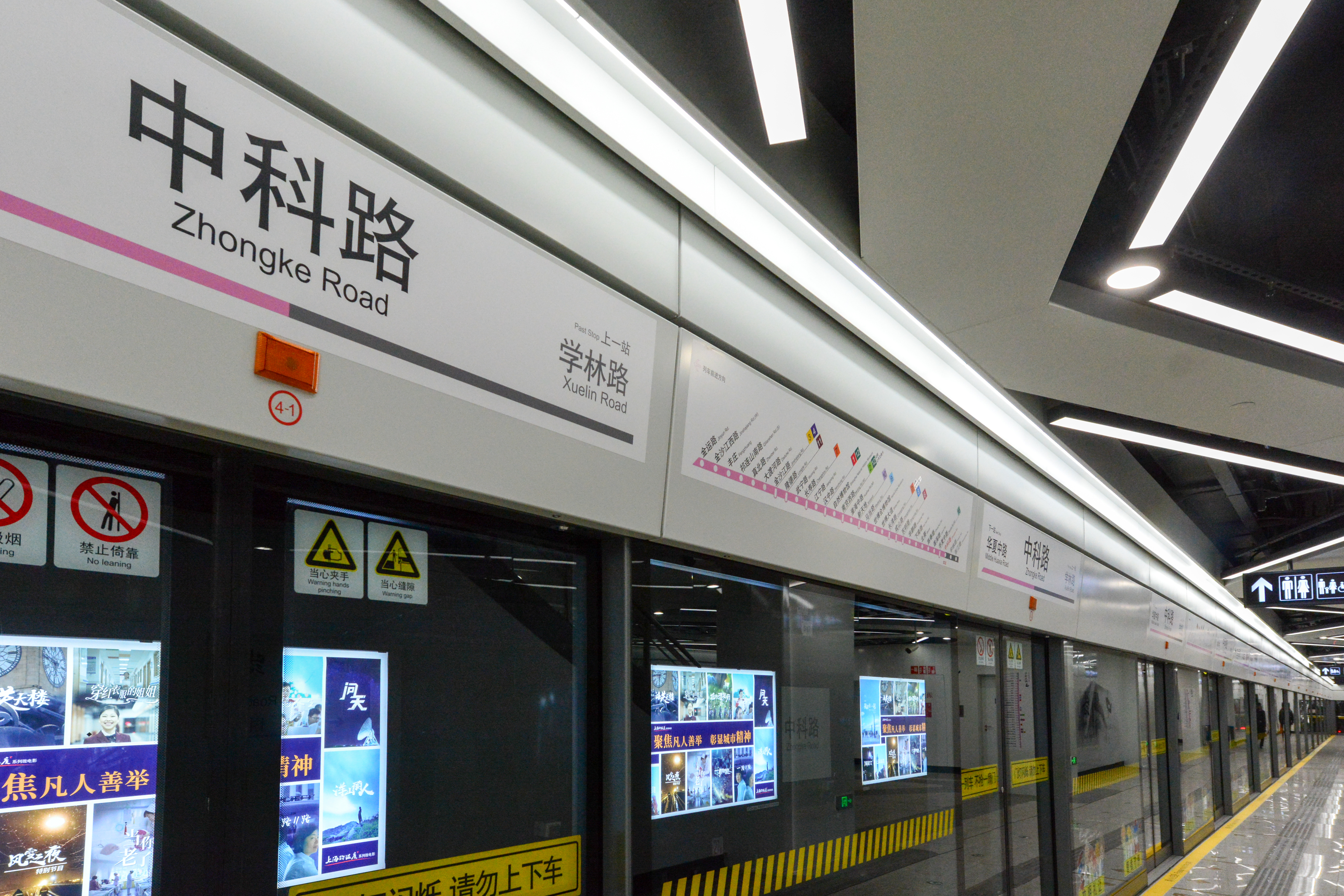
- Station platform, looking at Jinyun Road-bound side

General information
- Location: Zhongke Road and Jinke Road, Pudong, Shanghai; China
- Coordinates: 31.1810°N 121.5964°E
- Operated by: Shanghai No. 2 Metro Operation Co. Ltd.
- Line: Line 13
- Platforms: 2 (1 island platform)
- Tracks: 2

Construction
- Structure type: Underground
- Accessible: Yes

History
- Opened: 30 December 2018

Services
Preceding station	Shanghai Metro	Following station
Middle Huaxia Road towards Jinyun Road	Line 13	Xuelin Road towards Zhangjiang Road
Location

Zhongke Road (Chinese: 中科路; pinyin: Zhōngkē Lù) is a station on Line 13 of the Shanghai Metro, part of phase three of the line. Located at Zhongke Road and Jinke Road in Pudong, Shanghai, the station opened with the phases 2 and 3 extensions of Line 13 on 30 December 2018.

== Gallery ==
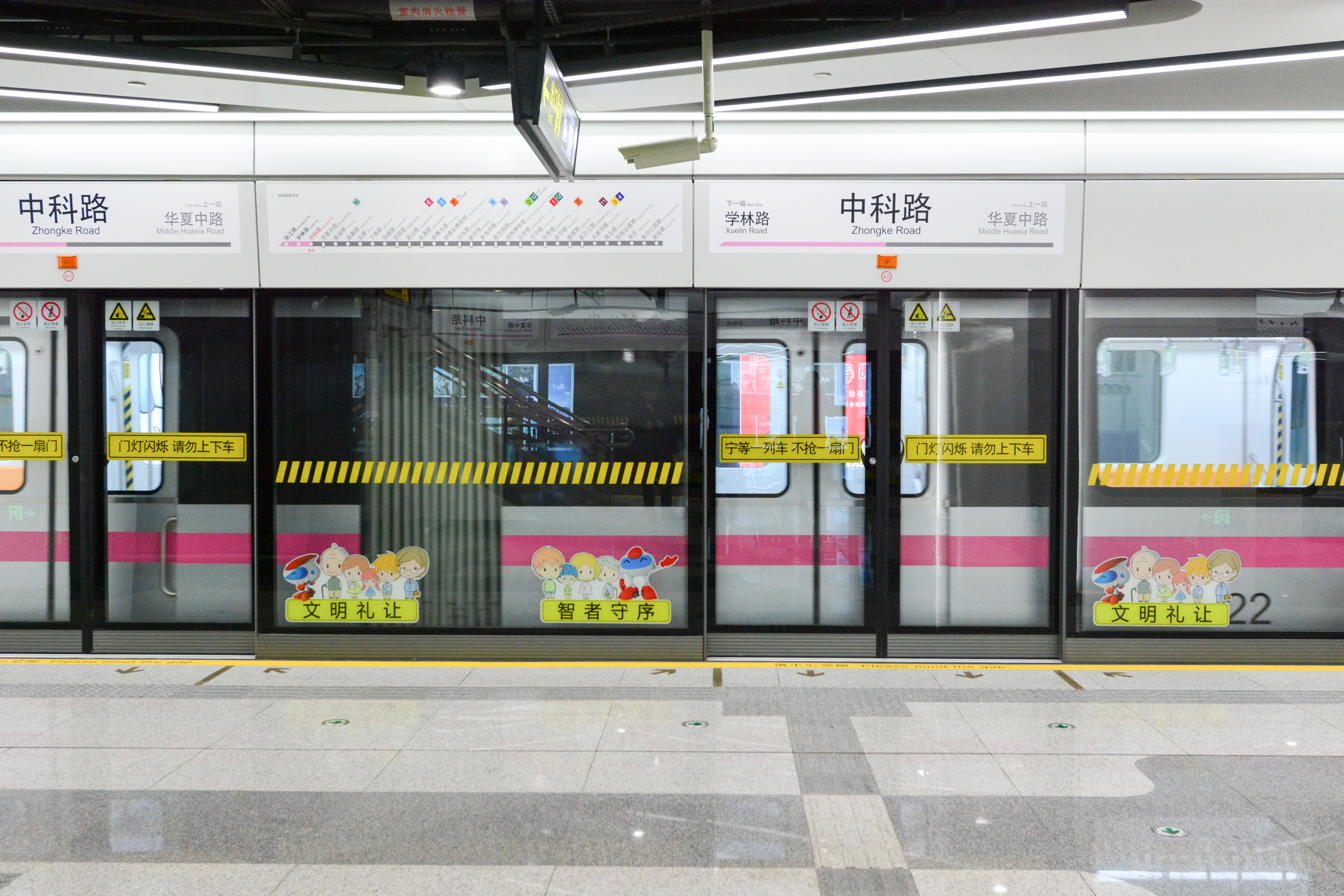
The first Zhangjiang Road-bound Line 13 train passes through Zhongke Road station on its opening day, 30 December 2018.

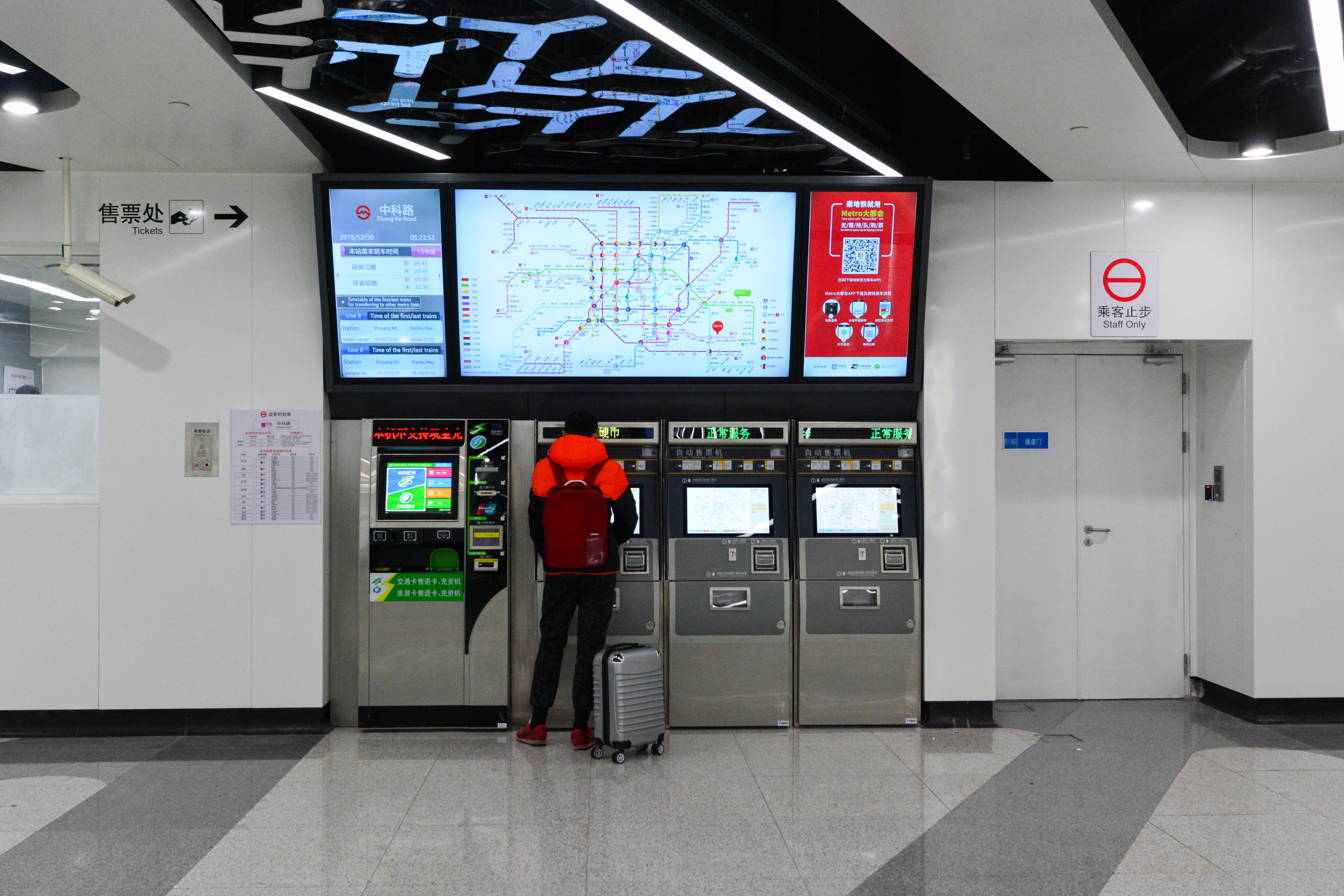
Self-serve ticket counters

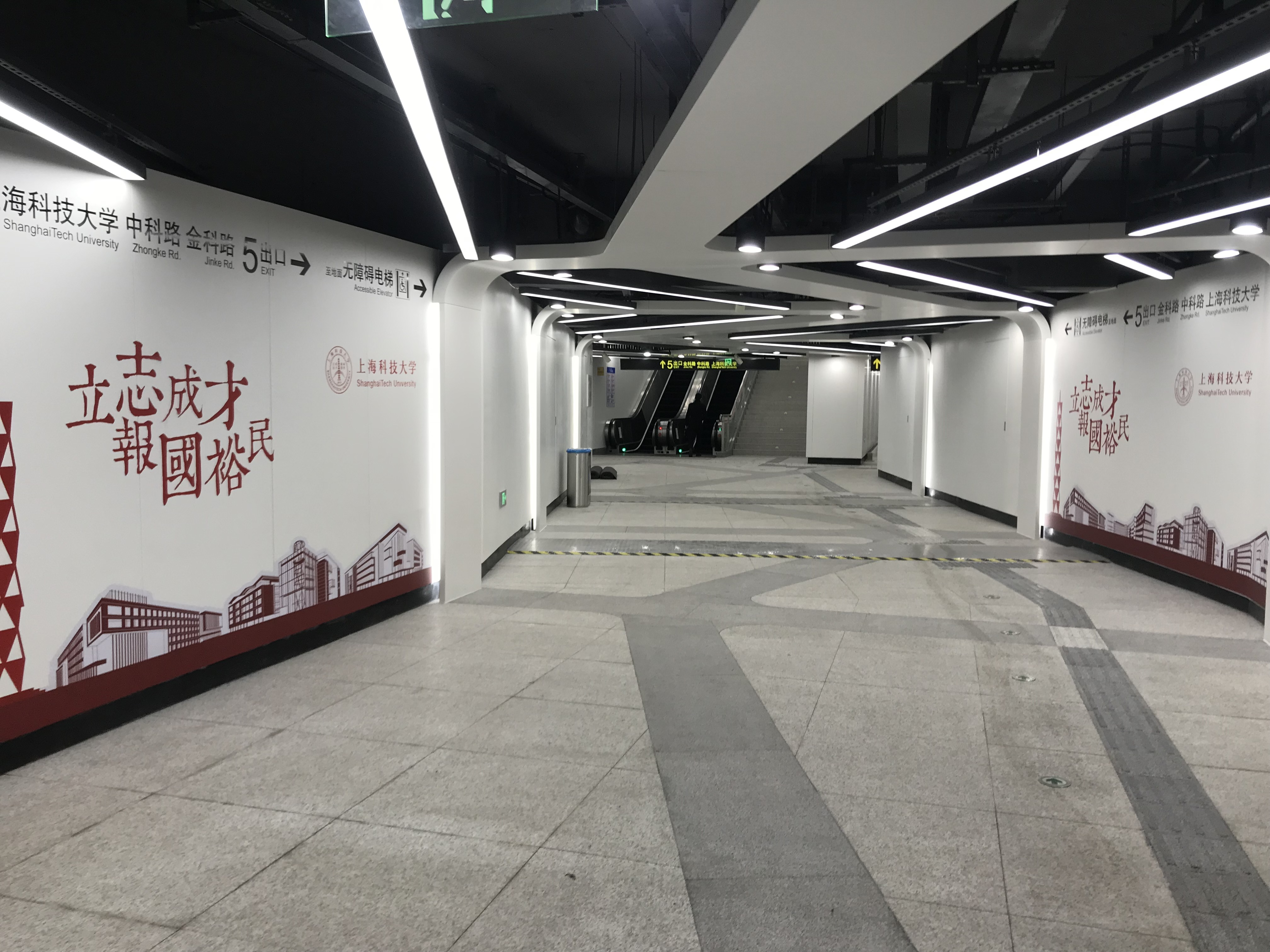
The motto of ShanghaiTech University, which is located in the vicinity, is displayed at exit 5 of Zhongke Road station.

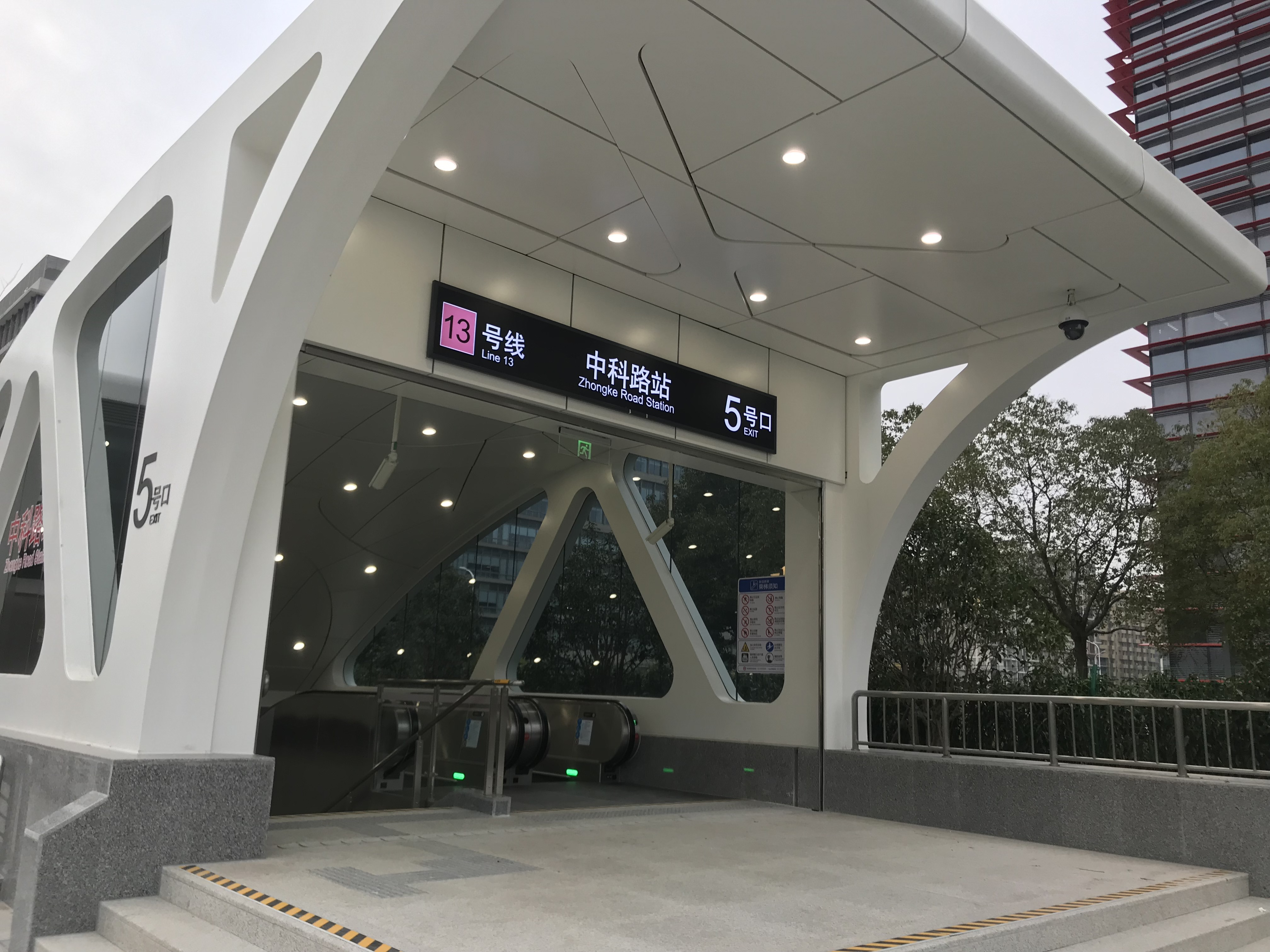
Exit 5 of Zhongke Road station
