= Huapeng Road station =

Metro station in Shanghai, China

Huapeng Road 华鹏路
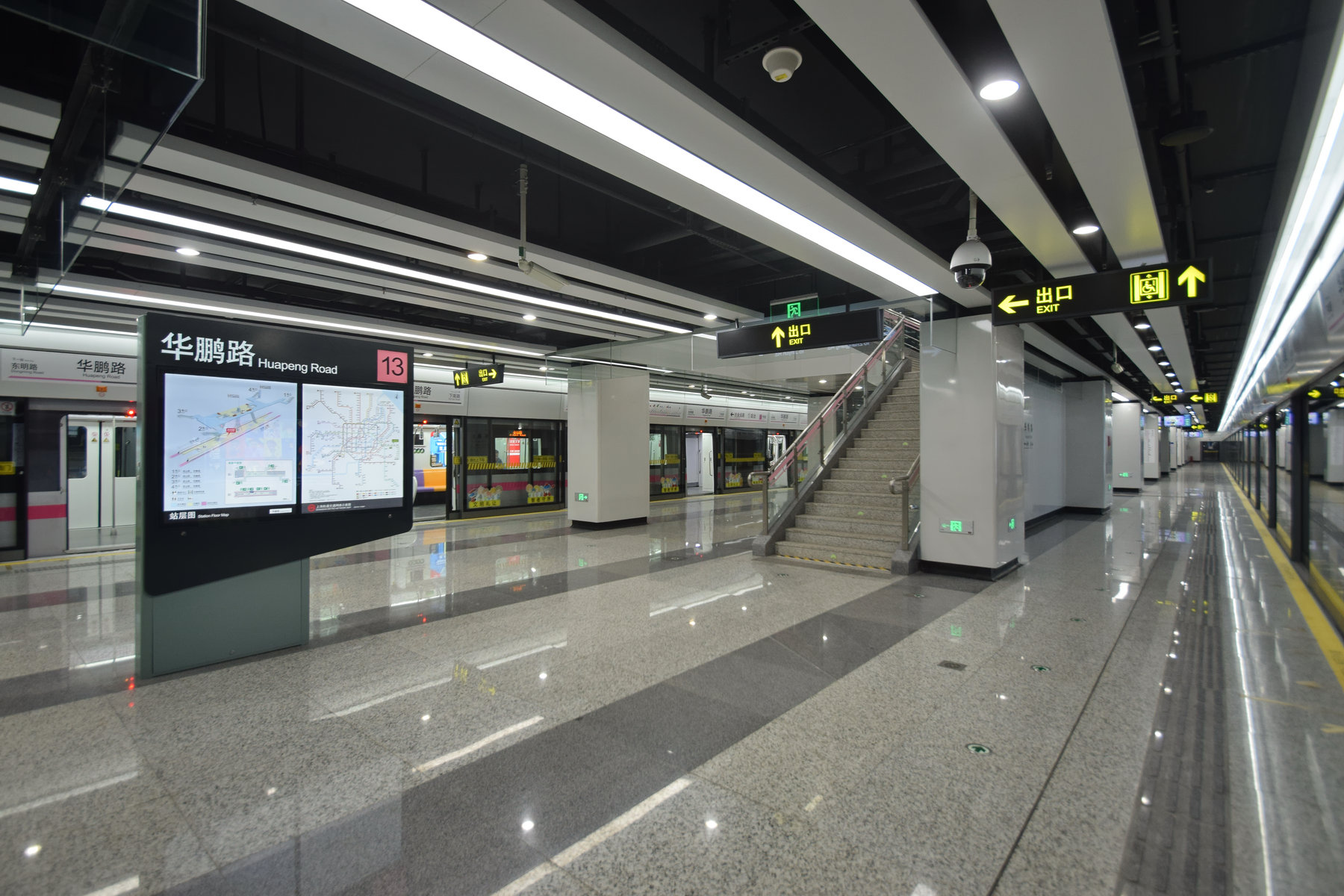
- Station Platform

General information
- Other names: Liuli (former)
- Location: Chengshan Road and Huapeng Road, Pudong New Area, Shanghai; China
- Coordinates: 31.1787°N 121.5226°E
- Operated by: Shanghai No. 2 Metro Operation Co. Ltd.
- Line: Line 13
- Platforms: 2 (1 island platform)
- Tracks: 2

Construction
- Structure type: Underground
- Accessible: Yes

History
- Opened: 30 December 2018

Services
Preceding station	Shanghai Metro	Following station
Dongming Road towards Jinyun Road	Line 13	Xia'nan Road towards Zhangjiang Road
Location

Huapeng Road (simplified Chinese: 华鹏路; traditional Chinese: 華鵬路; pinyin: Huápéng Lù) is a station on Line 13 of the Shanghai Metro, part of phase two of the line. Located at Chengshan Road and Huapeng Road in the city's Pudong New Area, the station opened with the rest of phases two and three of Line 13 on 30 December 2018. During the planning stages, the station was known as Liuli (Chinese: 六里).
