= Shibo Avenue station =

Metro station in Shanghai, China

Shibo Avenue 世博大道
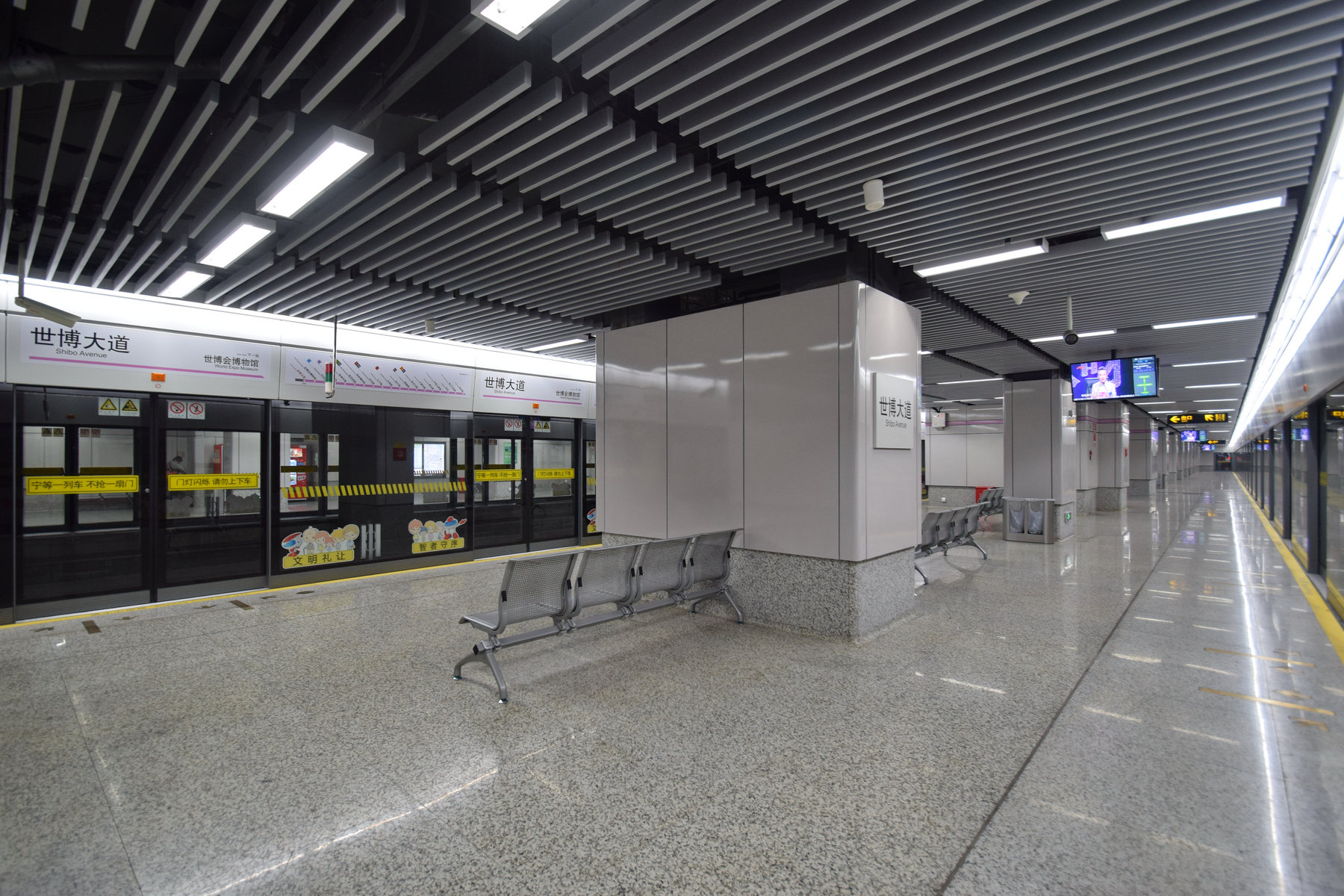
- Island platform

General information
- Location: Pudong, Shanghai; China
- Coordinates: 31°11′06″N 121°28′45″E
- Operated by: Shanghai No. 2 Metro Operation Co. Ltd.
- Line: Line 13
- Platforms: 3 (1 island and 1 side platform)
- Tracks: 3

Construction
- Structure type: Underground
- Accessible: Yes

History
- Opened: 20 April 2010; 19 December 2015 (reopen)
- Closed: 2 November 2010 (suspended)

Services
Preceding station	Shanghai Metro	Following station
World Expo Museum towards Jinyun Road	Line 13	Changqing Road towards Zhangjiang Road
Location

Shibo Avenue (Chinese: 世博大道; pinyin: Shìbó Dàdào) is a station on Line 13 of the Shanghai Metro. It served as the eastern terminus of the line until 30 December 2018, when the extension of Line 13 to Zhangjiang Road opened.

The station has 3 tracks, one island platform, and one side platform. The inner island platform is not in service. Trains heading to Jinyun Road use the outer island platform, whilst trains towards Zhangjiang Road use the side platform.

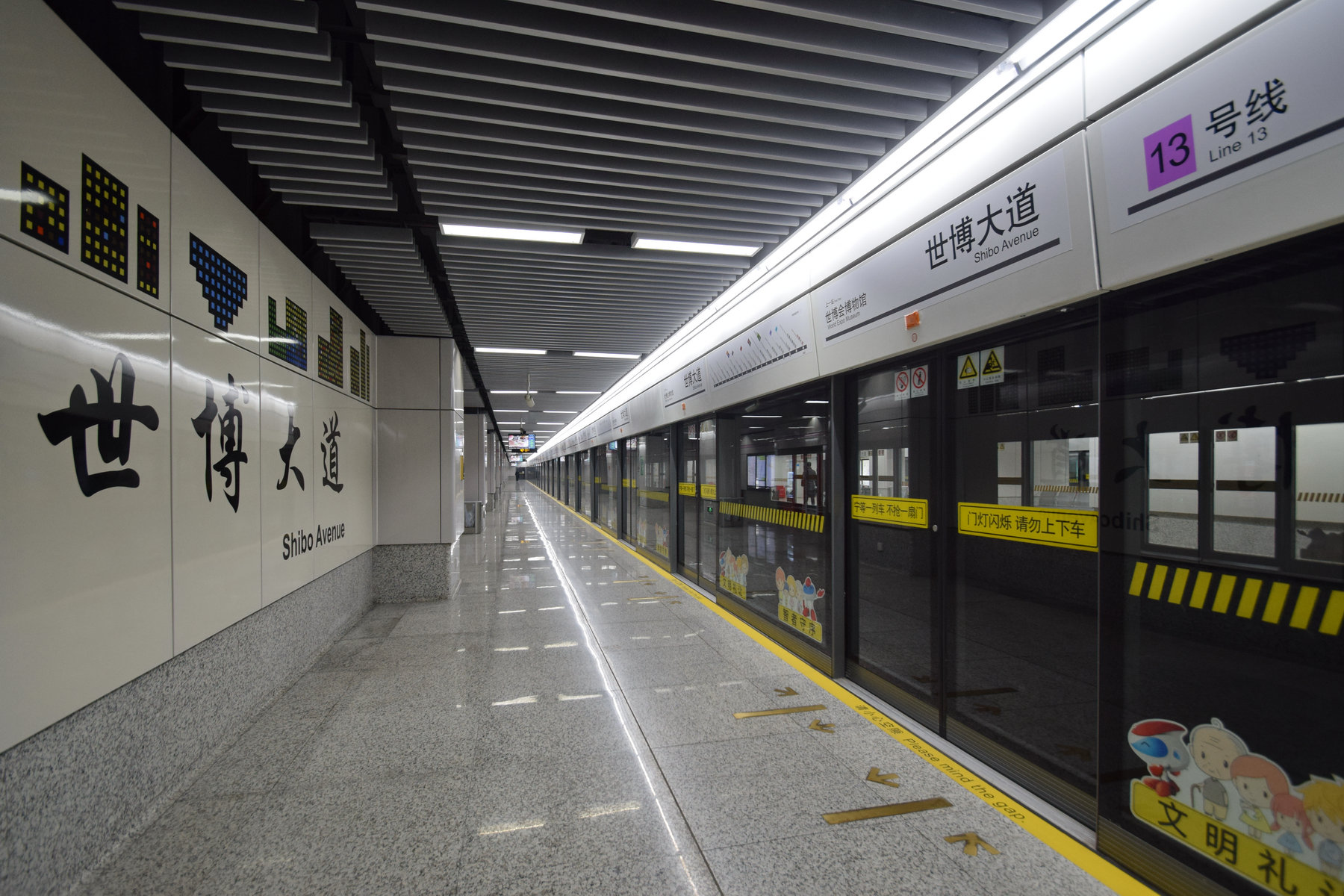
Side platform
