= Beicai station =

Metro station in Shanghai, China

Beicai 北蔡
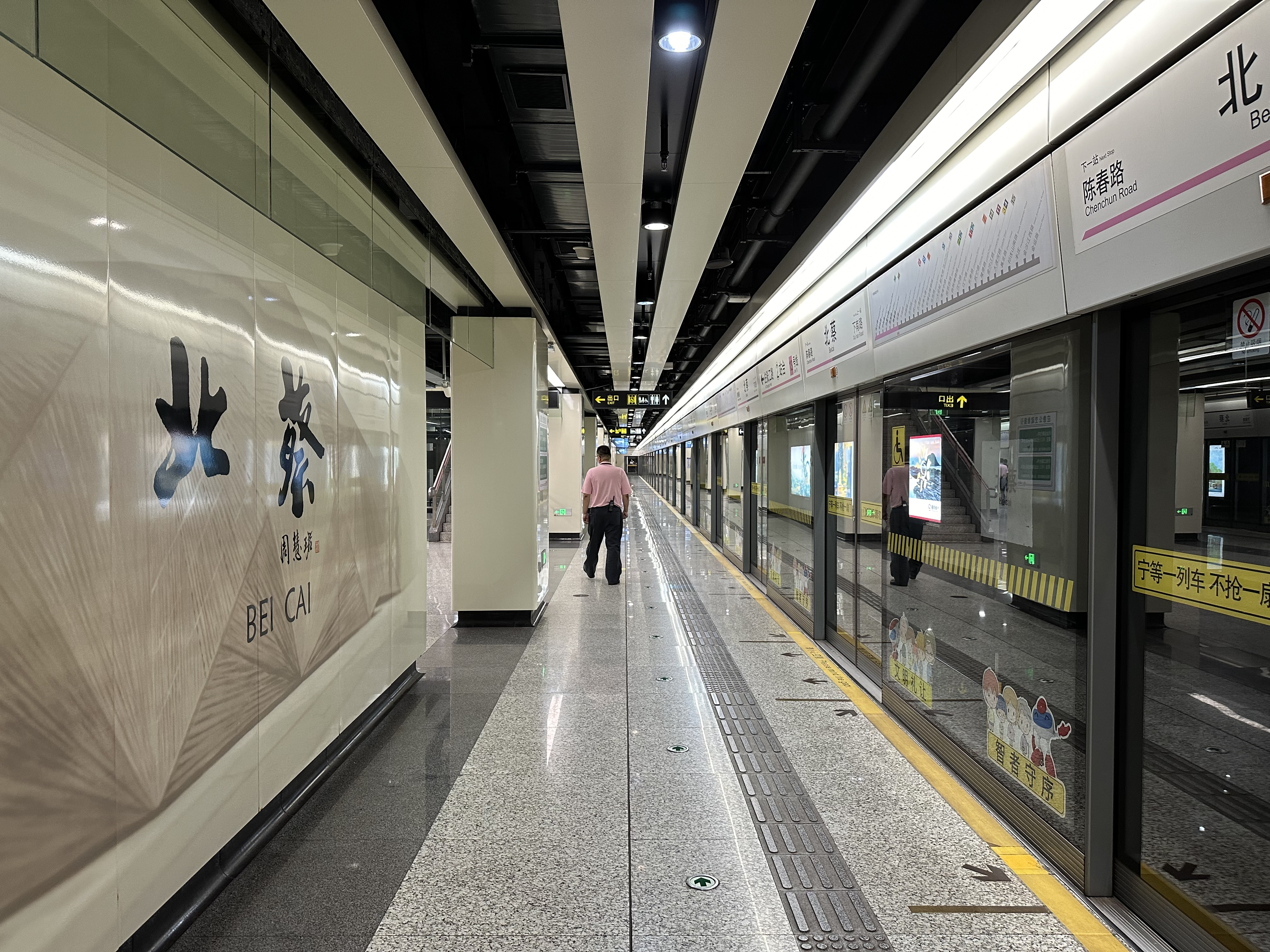
- Station Platform

General information
- Location: Chengshan Road and West Lian'an Road, Pudong New Area, Shanghai; China
- Coordinates: 31.18213°N 121.54777°E
- Operated by: Shanghai No. 2 Metro Operation Co. Ltd.
- Line: Line 13
- Platforms: 2 (1 island platform)
- Tracks: 2

Construction
- Structure type: Underground
- Accessible: Yes

History
- Opened: 30 December 2018

Services
Preceding station	Shanghai Metro	Following station
Xia'nan Road towards Jinyun Road	Line 13	Chenchun Road towards Zhangjiang Road
Location

Beicai (Chinese: 北蔡; pinyin: Běicài) is a station on Line 13 of the Shanghai Metro, part of phase two of the line. Located at Chengshan Road and West Lian'an Road in the city's Pudong New Area, the station opened along with the rest of phases two and three of Line 13 on 30 December 2018.
