= Jade Buddha Temple =

Buddhist temple in Shanghai, China

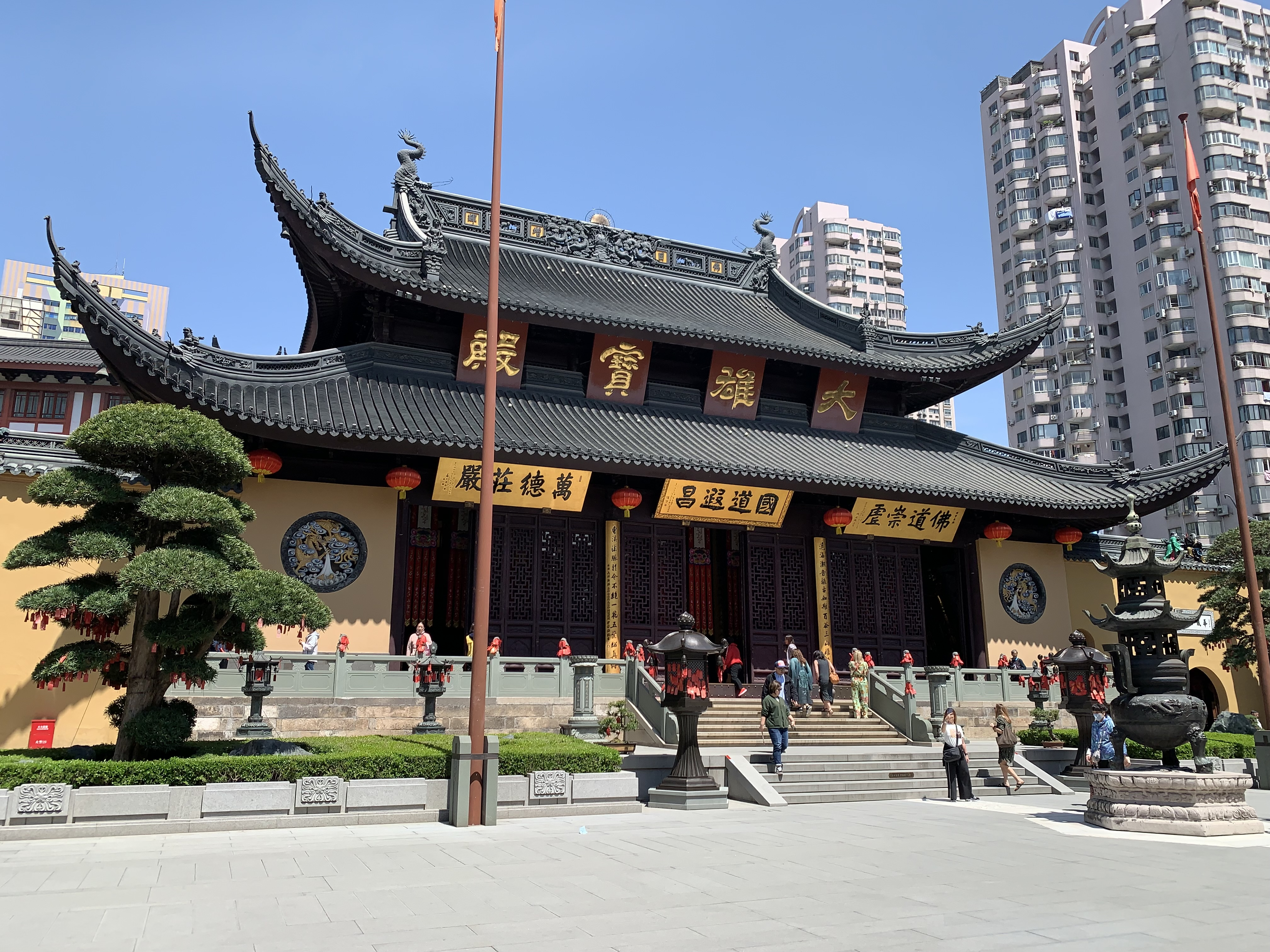
- Main hall of the Jade Buddha Temple

- Location in Shanghai

Religion
- Affiliation: Buddhism

Location
- Country: China
- Interactive map of Jade Buddha Temple
- Coordinates: 31°14′35.49″N 121°26′25.90″E

Architecture
- Completed: 1882

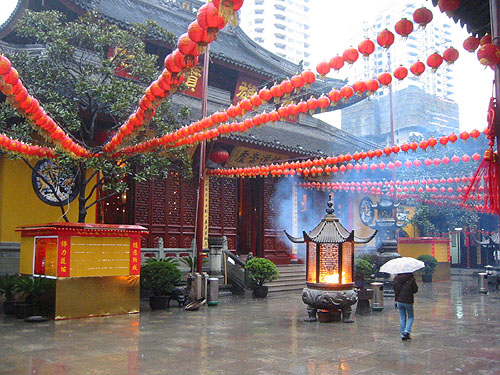
Jade Buddha Temple's main courtyard and Grand Hall

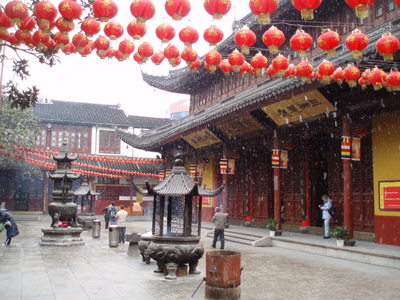
Jade Buddha Temple during 'spring snows'

The Jade Buddha Temple (simplified Chinese: 玉佛禅寺; traditional Chinese: 玉佛禪寺; pinyin: Yùfó Chán Sì; Shanghainese: Niohveh Zoe Zy, literally Jade Buddha Chan Temple) is a Buddhist temple in Shanghai. It was founded in 1882 with two jade Buddha statues imported to Shanghai from Myanmar by sea. These were a sitting Buddha (1.95 meters tall, 3 tons), and a smaller reclining Buddha representing the Buddha's death. The temple now also contains a much larger reclining Buddha made of marble, donated from Singapore, and visitors may mistake this larger sculpture for the original, smaller piece.

The legend behind the transport of the Buddha statues from Myanmar led to the popular usage of Burmese-style Buddha statues in Chinese temples.

== History ==
During the reign of the Guangxu Emperor (r. 1875–1908) in the Qing dynasty, Huigen, a Buddhist monk from Mount Putuo, went on a pilgrimage to Tibet via Mount Wutai and Mount Emei. He visited Burma after leaving Tibet. Whilst there, Chen Jun-Pu, an overseas Chinese resident in Burma, donated five jade Buddha statues to Huigen, who transported two of them back to Jiang-wan, Shanghai. Here, Huigen had a temple built with donated funds, and died shortly thereafter. This temple was occupied during the 1911 uprising, and the statues were moved to Maigen Road.

A Buddhist monk by the name of Kechen later had a new temple built on land donated by Sheng Xuanhuai, a senior official in the Qing imperial court. Sheng's father and uncle were pious Buddhists. They built houses with thatched roofs at Yizhou Pond by the Zhuanghuabang River in the northeast of Shanghai. This can be accounted as the predecessor of the monastery. The construction took ten years, and lasted from 1918 to 1928. Kechen also invited Reverend Dixian from Mount Tiantai to come and lecture on Buddhism in a grand ceremony.

Master Taixu died in the Jade Buddha Temple on March 12, 1947.

In 1956, a ceremony was held at the temple by the Shanghai Buddhist Association to celebrate the 2500th anniversary of The Buddha's enlightenment.

In 1966, during the Cultural Revolution, monks affixed posters of Mao Zedong on the exterior of the Temple in order to prevent revolutionaries from destroying the temple.

In 1983, the Shanghai Institute of Buddhism was established at the temple under the Shanghai Buddhist Association.

In 1985, Monk Zhizhi Xuan and others made a trip to Dunhuang via Xinjiang. Shortly after their return, regular scripture lectures, meditation and other features of temple life were resumed.

== Temple layout ==
=== Chamber of Four Heavenly Kings ===
The Chamber of Four Heavenly Kings contains the statues of Mi Le, Weituo and the Four Heavenly Kings, who represent favorable circumstance. The chamber is located on the southern-edge, or 'front' of the temple.

=== Grand Hall ===
The Grand Hall, also called the Great Hall, this hall contains many statues.

- Three Golden Buddhas. The central sculpture is of Shijiamouni (Śākyamuni), the left of Amituofo (Amitābha) and the right of Yaoshi (Bhaisajyaguru).
- Twenty Devas. Statues of the Twenty Devas, covered in gold, line the eastern and western sides of the Grand Hall.
- 18 Arhats. 18 unique golden arhats stand in two groups of nine.
- Guanyin, Sudhana and his 53 teachers. A large golden statue of Guanyin stands on at northern entrance to the Great Hall, with Shancai at Guanyin's side and sculptures representing the 53 teachers of his life above.

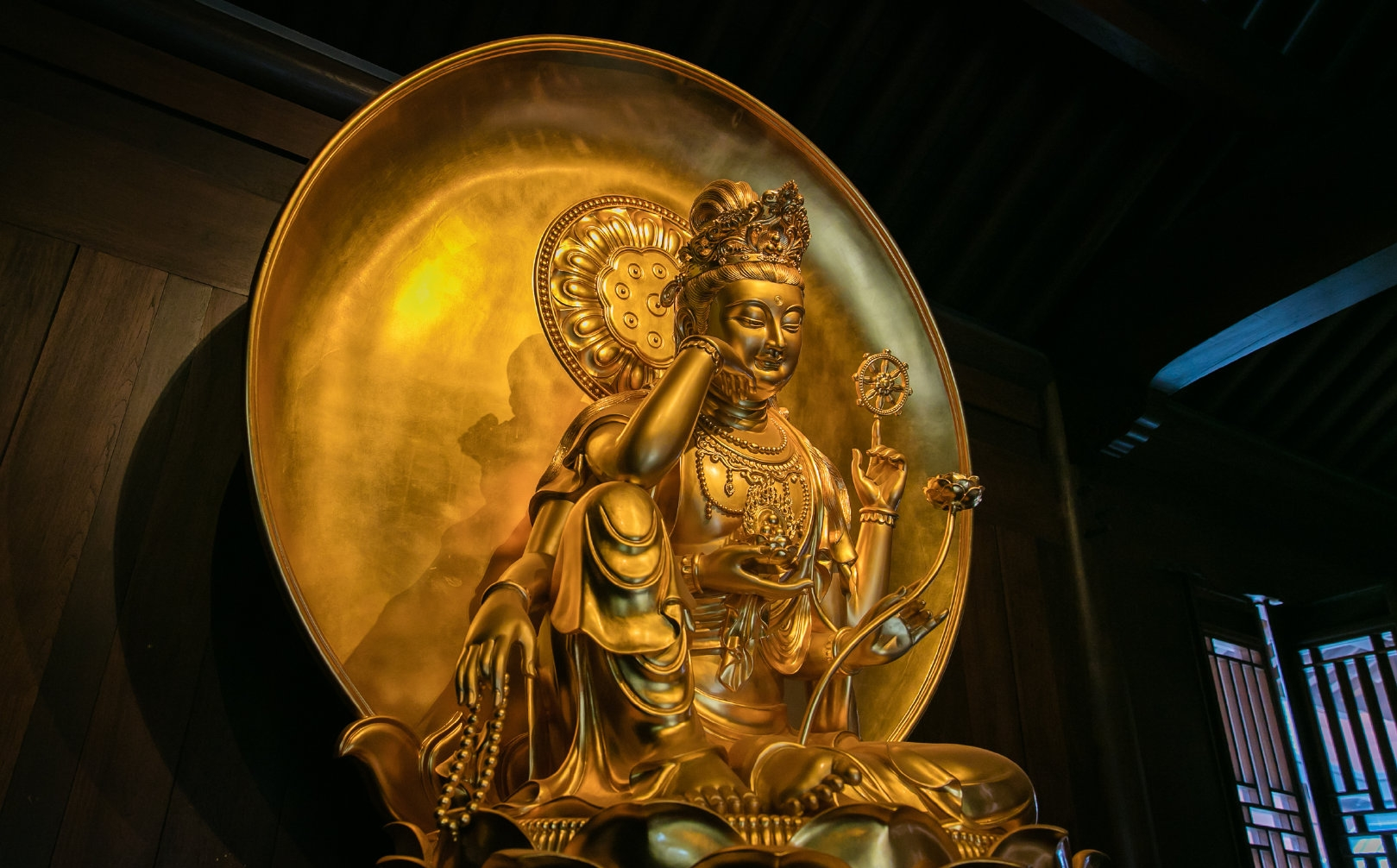
Statue of Ruyilun Guanyin (Cintāmaṇicakra) in the Hall of Great Compassion of the Temple

=== Jade Buddha Chamber ===
The Jade Buddha Chamber is in the northern section of the temple, on the second floor. A fee of 10 yuan is charged to ascend to it. Some additional Buddhist sculptures are also viewable in the antechamber.

=== Public restaurant ===
The public restaurant is located on level two at the eastern edge of the temple and equipped with its own street entrance. Open daily, it serves a range of noodle dishes for five yuan per bowl, the most popular of which is 'double mushroom noodles' (双菇面). Other dishes are served at moderate prices. Tickets are sold by color and this ticket is turned in inside the main eating room and your soup is then delivered to your table which you might share with others. Upstairs is a much more upscale restaurant at much higher prices.

=== Other ===
The temple also contains a private restaurant for the use of monks and temple volunteers, which is at the western edge of the temple complex. There is a visitor services office adjacent to the southern entrance, and a Buddhist library is also on the premises.

=== Transport ===
The public can board various public buses including Route 16 and can take the Line 13 of the Shanghai Metro to Jiangning Road Station to arrive at the Jade Buddha Temple.
