= Middle Huaxia Road station =

Shanghai Metro station

Middle Huaxia Road 华夏中路
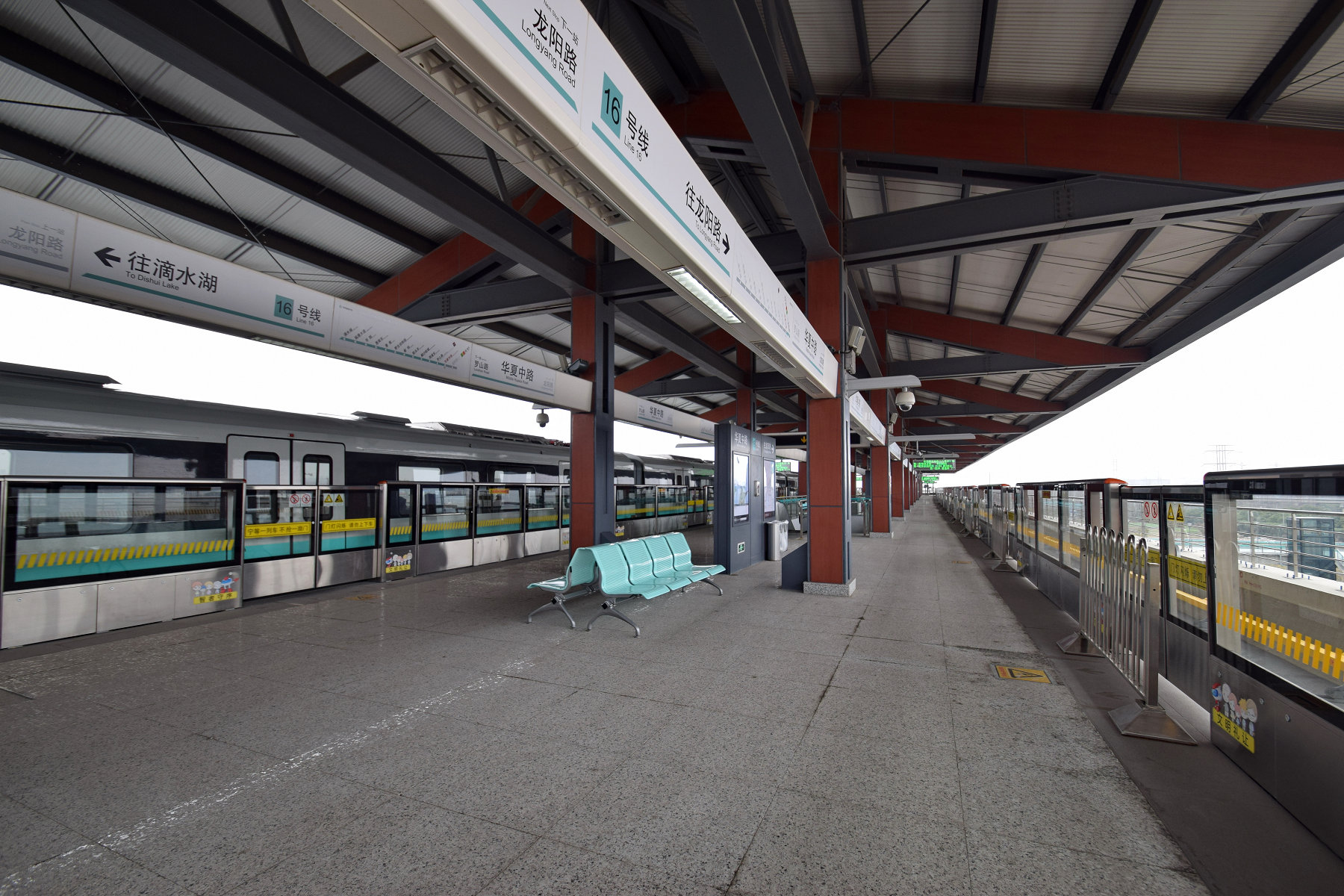
- Line 16 platform

General information
- Location: Middle Huaxia Road (华夏中路) and Luoshan Road (罗山路); Pudong, Shanghai; China
- Coordinates: 31.177873°N 121.578874°E
- Lines: Line 13; Line 16
- Platforms: 6 (3 island platforms)
- Tracks: 5

Construction
- Structure type: Elevated (Line 16); Underground (Line 13)
- Accessible: Yes

History
- Opened: 28 December 2014 (Line 13); 30 December 2018 (Line 16)

Services
Preceding station	Shanghai Metro	Following station
Lianxi Road towards Jinyun Road	Line 13	Zhongke Road towards Zhangjiang Road
Longyang Road Terminus	Line 16	Luoshan Road towards Dishui Lake
Location
- Location within Shanghai

Middle Huaxia Road (simplified Chinese: 华夏中路; traditional Chinese: 華夏中路; pinyin: Huáxià Zhōng Lù) is an interchange station on Lines 13 and 16 of the Shanghai Metro. It opened for passenger operations on 28 December 2014, with the extension of Line 16 from Luoshan Road to Longyang Road. On 30 December 2018, it became an interchange station with Line 13 when the phases 2 and 3 extensions of the line to Zhangjiang Road became operational.

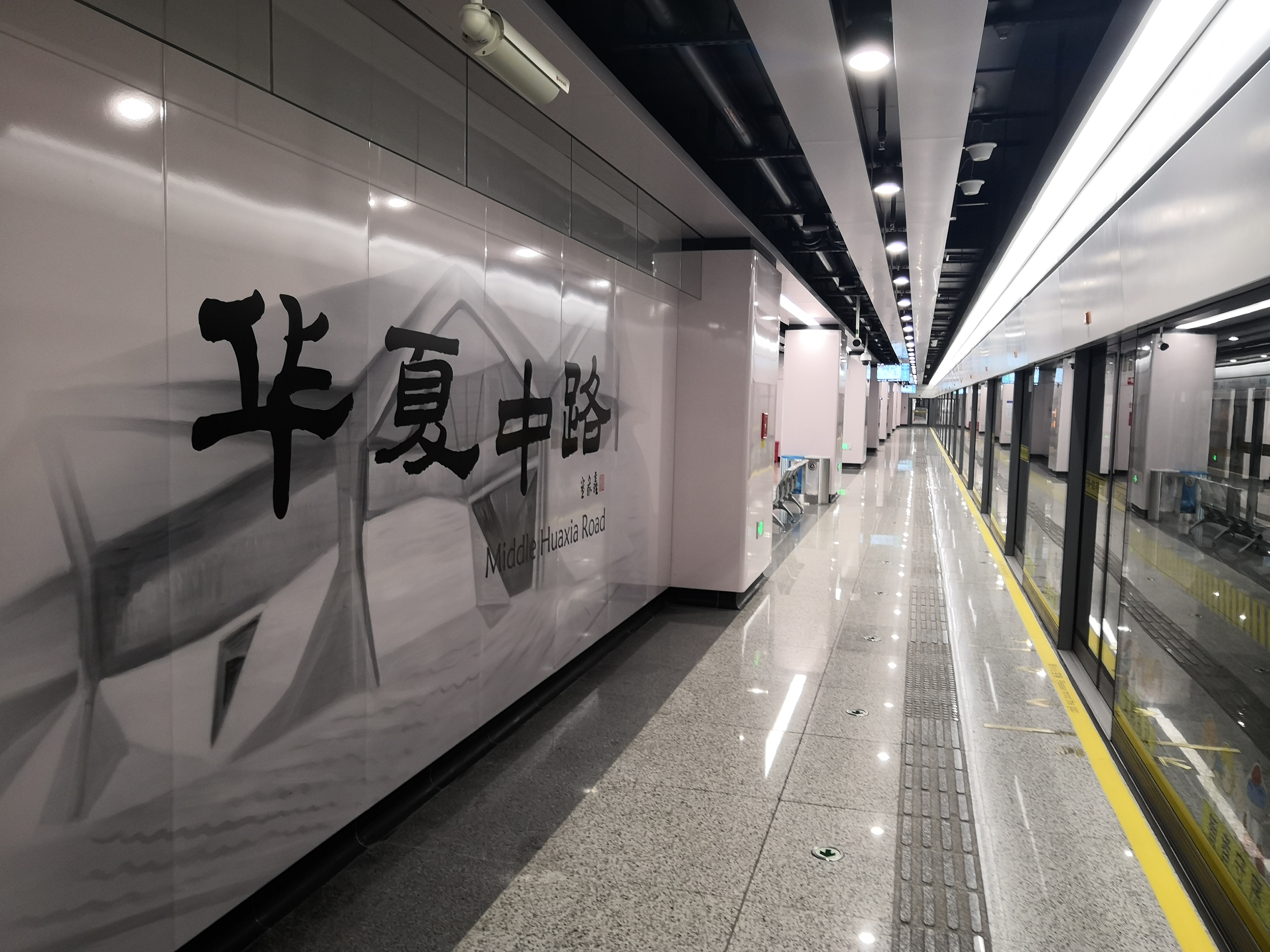
Line 13 platform

== Station Layout ==
3F	Northbound	← Line 16 towards Longyang Road (Terminus)
3F	Island platform, doors open on the left
3F	Southbound	Line 16 towards Dishui Lake (Luoshan Road) →
2F	Line 16 Concourse	Faregates, Station Agent
G	Entrances and Exits	Exits 1-6
B1	Line 13 Concourse	Faregates, Station Agent
B2	Westbound	← Line 13 towards Jinyun Road (Lianxi Road)
B2	Island platform, doors open on the left
B2		Not in service
B2	Island platform, doors open on the left
B2	Eastbound	Line 13 towards Zhangjiang Road (Zhongke Road) →
