= West Jinshajiang Road station =

Shanghai Metro station

West Jinshajiang Road 金沙江西路
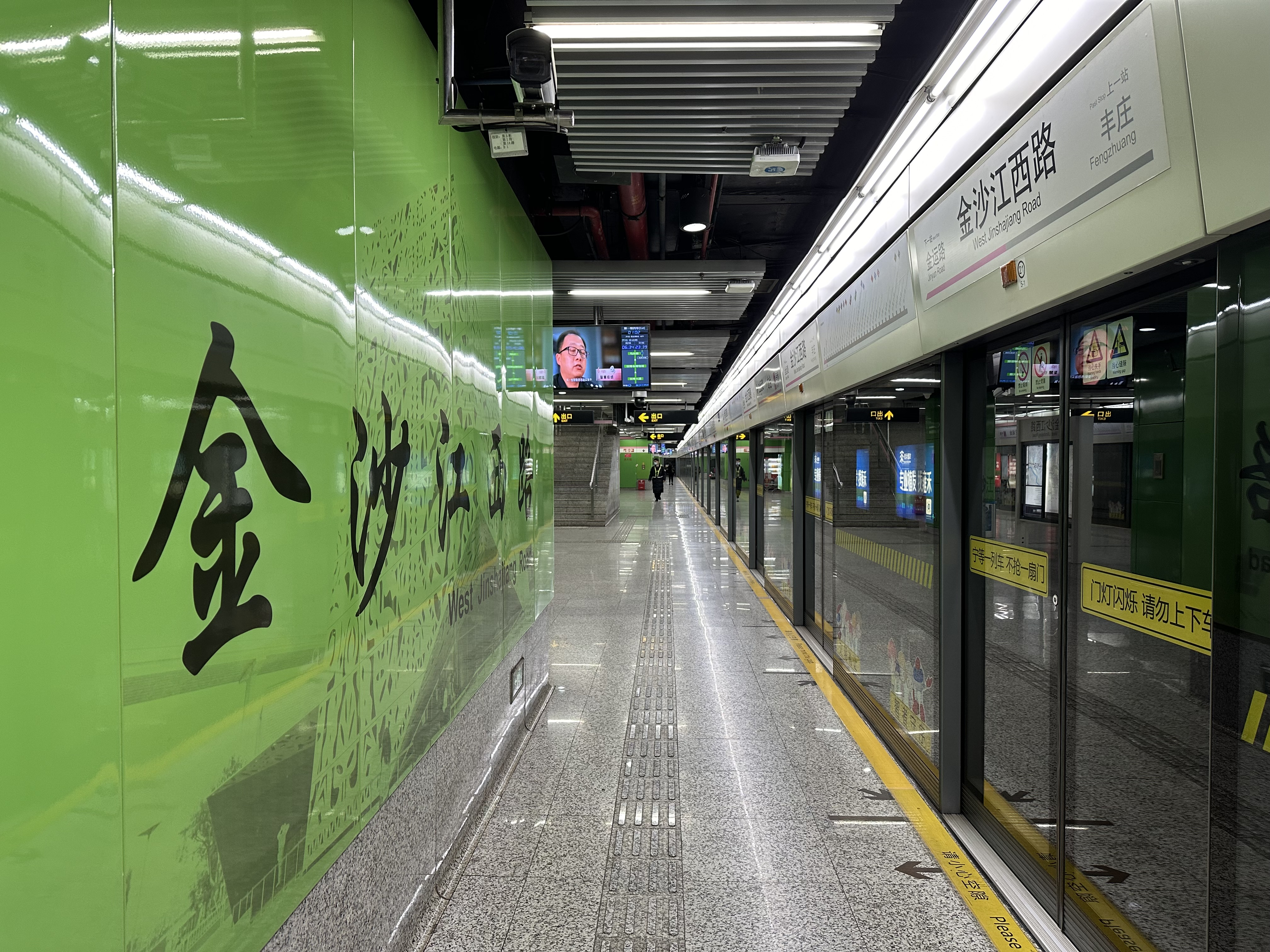
- Station platform

General information
- Location: West Jinshajiang Road and Gaochao Road (高潮路); Jiading District, Shanghai; China
- Coordinates: 31.2430886°N 121.3306597°E
- Operated by: Shanghai No. 2 Metro Operation Co., Ltd.
- Line: Line 13
- Platforms: 2 (1 island platform)
- Tracks: 2

Construction
- Structure type: Underground
- Accessible: Yes

History
- Opened: 30 December 2012

Services
Preceding station	Shanghai Metro	Following station
Jinyun Road Terminus	Line 13	Fengzhuang towards Zhangjiang Road
Location

West Jinshajiang Road (Chinese: 金沙江西路; pinyin: Jīnshājiāng Xīlù) is a station on Line 13 of the Shanghai Metro. It is located in Jiading District, Shanghai.

The name of the station can be confusing due to the existence of Jinshajiang Road station. During the 2021 Shanghai People’s Congress deputies suggested to change the latter name to East China Normal University.
