= Jiangning Road station =

Shanghai Metro station

Jiangning Road 江宁路
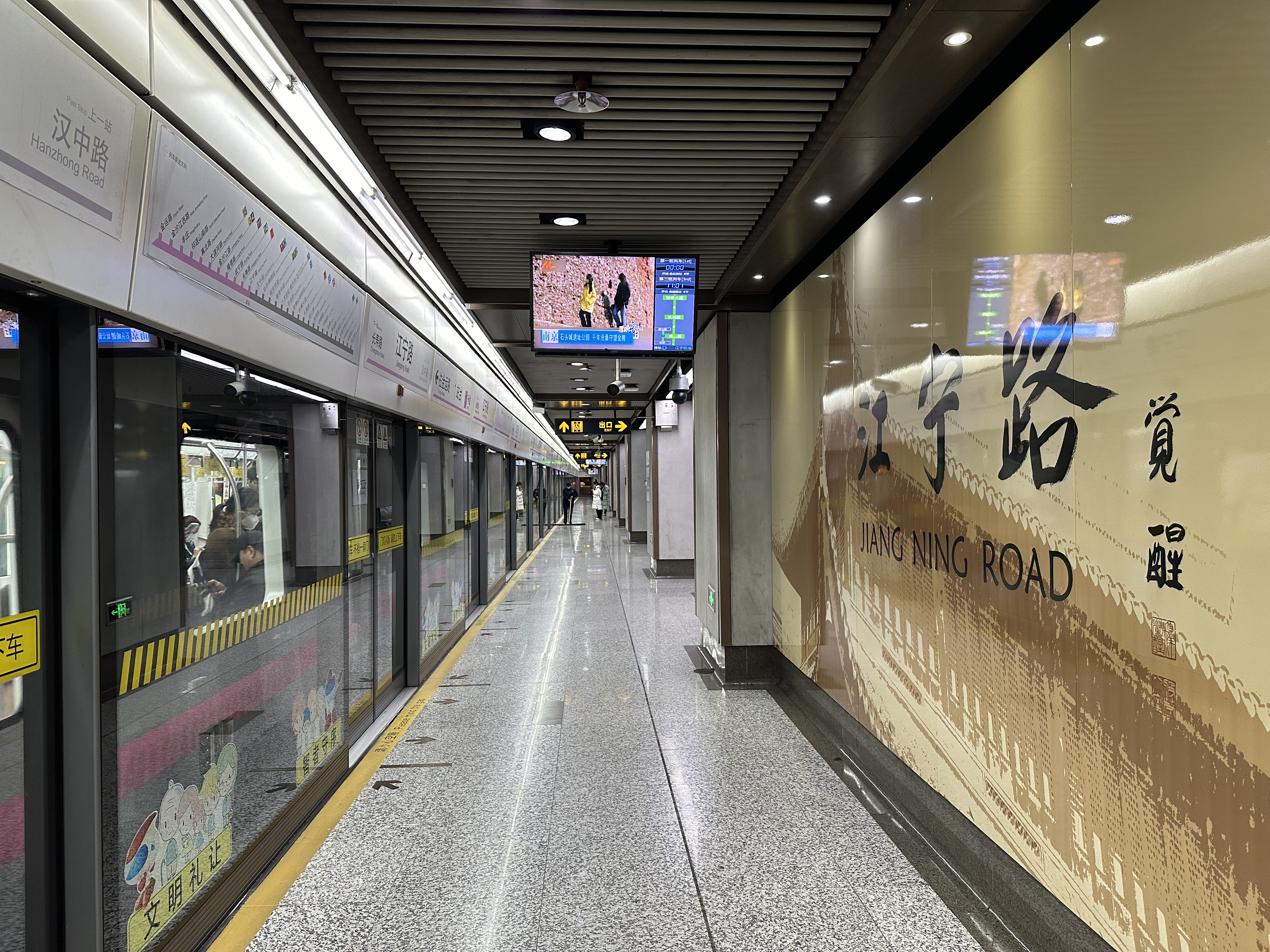
- Station platform

General information
- Location: Changshou Road and Jiangning Road; Putuo District, Shanghai; China
- Coordinates: 31°14′46″N 121°26′24″E
- Operated by: Shanghai No. 2 Metro Operation Co. Ltd.
- Line: Line 13
- Platforms: 2 (1 island platform)
- Tracks: 2

Construction
- Structure type: Underground
- Accessible: Yes

History
- Opened: 19 December 2015

Services
Preceding station	Shanghai Metro	Following station
Changshou Road towards Jinyun Road	Line 13	Hanzhong Road towards Zhangjiang Road
Location

Jiangning Road (simplified Chinese: 江宁路; traditional Chinese: 江寧路; pinyin: Jiāngníng Lù) is a station on the Shanghai Metro, which services Line 13 and opened on 19 December 2015. Travelling eastward, this station is the last station in Putuo District before it passes under Suzhou Creek to Jing'an District.

== Exits ==
Jiangning Road station serves the south eastern part of Putuo District and is located below the intersection of Jiangning Road and Changshou Road. There are currently 4 entry points.
