= Xuelin Road station =

Metro station in Shanghai, China

Xuelin Road 学林路
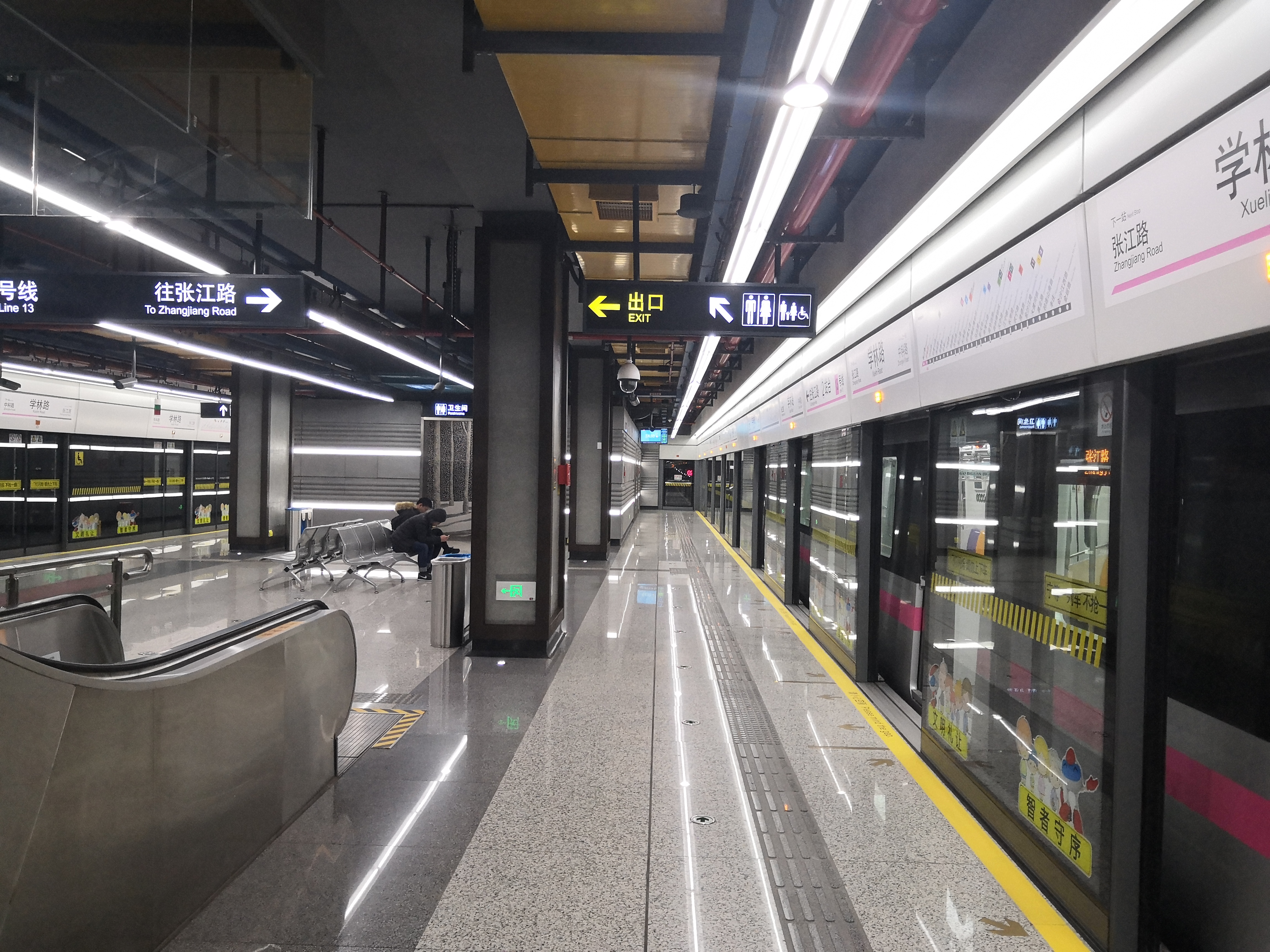
- Station platform

General information
- Location: Zhongke Road and Gebaini Road; Pudong, Shanghai; China
- Coordinates: 31.1858°N 121.6104°E
- Operator: Shanghai No. 2 Metro Operation Co. Ltd.
- Line: Line 13
- Platforms: 2 (1 island platform)
- Tracks: 2

Construction
- Structure type: Underground
- Accessible: Yes

History
- Opened: 30 December 2018

Services
Preceding station	Shanghai Metro	Following station
Zhongke Road towards Jinyun Road	Line 13	Zhangjiang Road Terminus
Location
- Location within Shanghai

Xuelin Road (simplified Chinese: 学林路; traditional Chinese: 學林路; pinyin: Xuélín Lù) is a station on Line 13 of the Shanghai Metro, part of phase three of the line. Located at Zhongke Road and Gebaini Road in Pudong, Shanghai, the station opened with the phases 2 and 3 extensions of Line 13 on 30 December 2018.

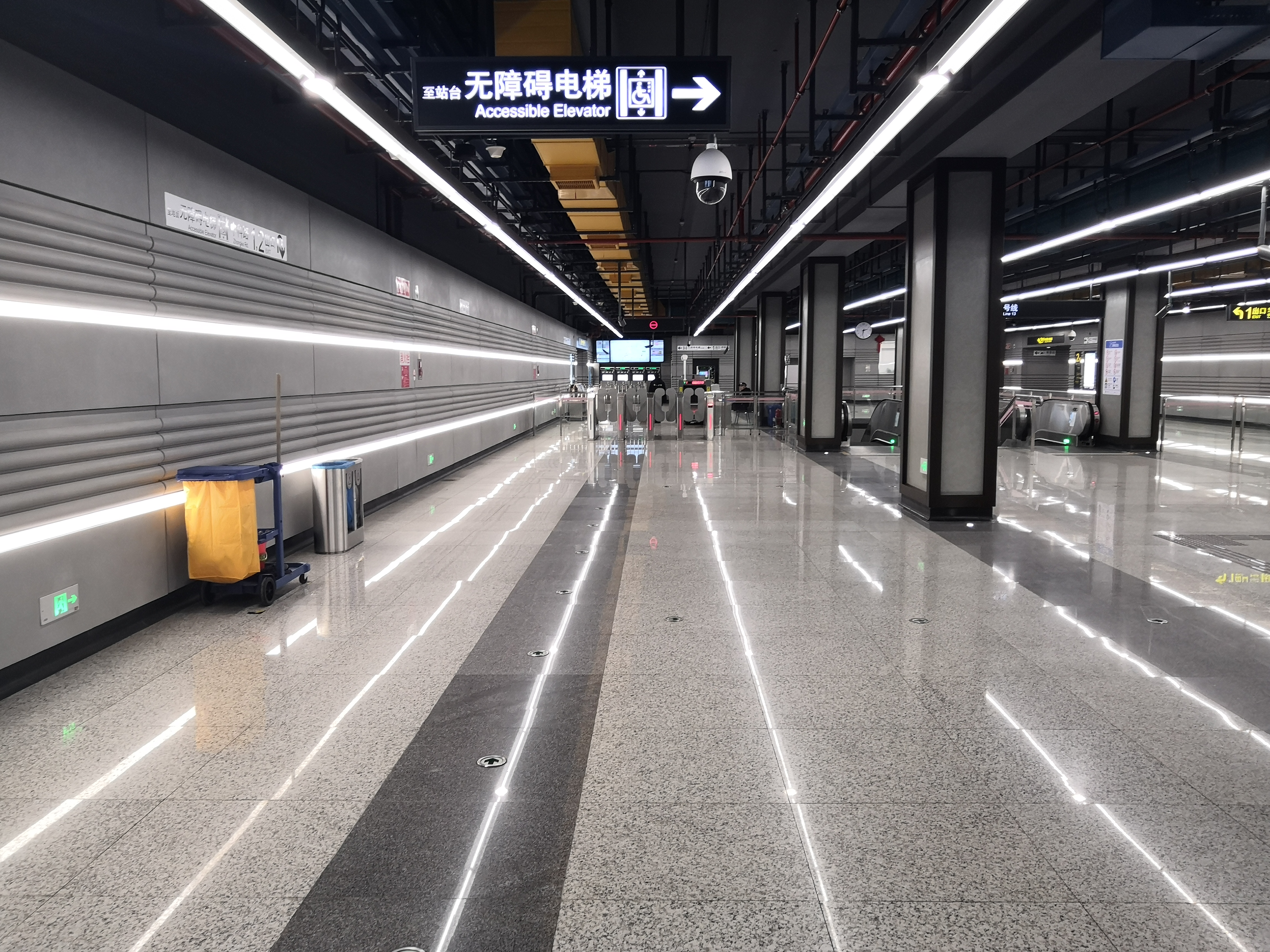
Station concourse
