= Shanghai Metro AC18 =

Rolling stock of Shanghai Metro

Shanghai Metro 13A01 AC18
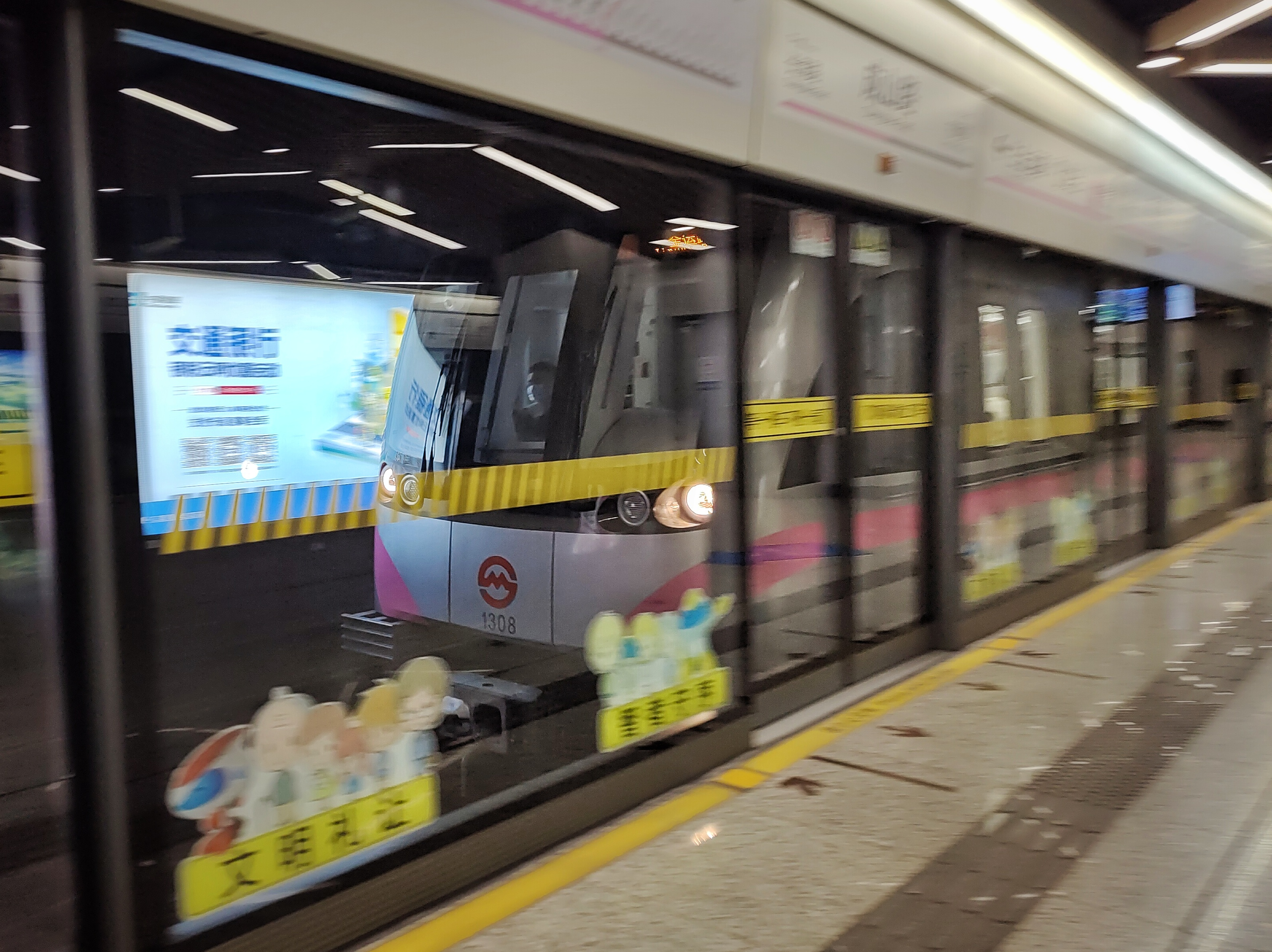
- Set 1308 entering Chengshan Road station in 2024
- Stock type: Class A EMU
- In service: 2012–present
- Manufacturer: CSR Nanjing Puzhen
- Built at: Nanjing, China
- Family name: CIVAS
- Constructed: 2011–2013
- Entered service: 30 December 2012
- Number built: 144
- Number in service: 144
- Formation: Tc-Mp-M+M-Mp-Tc
- Fleet numbers: 130011-131441
- Capacity: 310 per car
- Operators: Shentong Metro Group
- Depots: Beidi Road Depot; Chuanyang River Yard
- Lines served: 13

Specifications
- Car body construction: Aluminum alloy
- Train length: 139.98 m (459 ft 3 in)
- Car length: 23.54 m (77 ft 3 in)
- Width: 3 m (9 ft 10 in)
- Height: 3.8 m (12 ft 6 in)
- Doors: Electric doors
- Maximum speed: 80 km/h (50 mph)
- Traction system: Siemens Mobility G1500 D1100/400 M5-1 IGBT-VVVF
- Traction motors: Siemens Mobility 1TB2010-1GA02 3-phases AC induction motors
- Acceleration: Maximum 3.2 km/(h⋅s) (1.988 mph/s)
- Deceleration: 3.6 km/(h⋅s) (2.237 mph/s) (service); 4.7 km/(h⋅s) (2.920 mph/s) (emergency)
- Electric system(s): 1,500 V DC
- Current collection: Single-arm Pantograph
- Bogies: Siemens Mobility SF5000
- Safety system(s): Thales SelTrac (CBTC, ATO/GoA2)
- Track gauge: 4 ft 8 1/2 in (1,435 mm)

The 13A01 (formerly known as AC18) is a class of rolling stock used on Line 13 of Shanghai Metro. They are manufactured by CSR Nanjing Puzhen. Entered service in 2012. A total of 144 cars (24 sets) were built. In 2014, AC18 was renamed as 13A01.

== Description ==
The AC18s' exterior appearance is featured grey silver, black and pink. The interior layout features electric strip maps, orange LED displays on the gangways and improved lighting system. The propulsion systems are provided by Siemens, which the traction systems and motors are also utilized by PM0Gs for Hangzhou Metro, and PM0Ks for Suzhou Metro before. The bogies are designed by Siemens and built by CSR Nanjing Puzhen. AC18s' seats are mainly orange-painted, with the priority seat in purple.

Currently, 13A01s are receiving an upgrade for the interior LCD TVs, which allow the TVs show the next station and the terminal station of the service.

== Proposed signaling upgrade ==
13A01 is planned to upgrade signaling from ATO (GoA2) to DTO (GoA3) at least after 2026.
