= Jinshajiang Road station =

Shanghai Metro interchange station

Jinshajiang Road 金沙江路
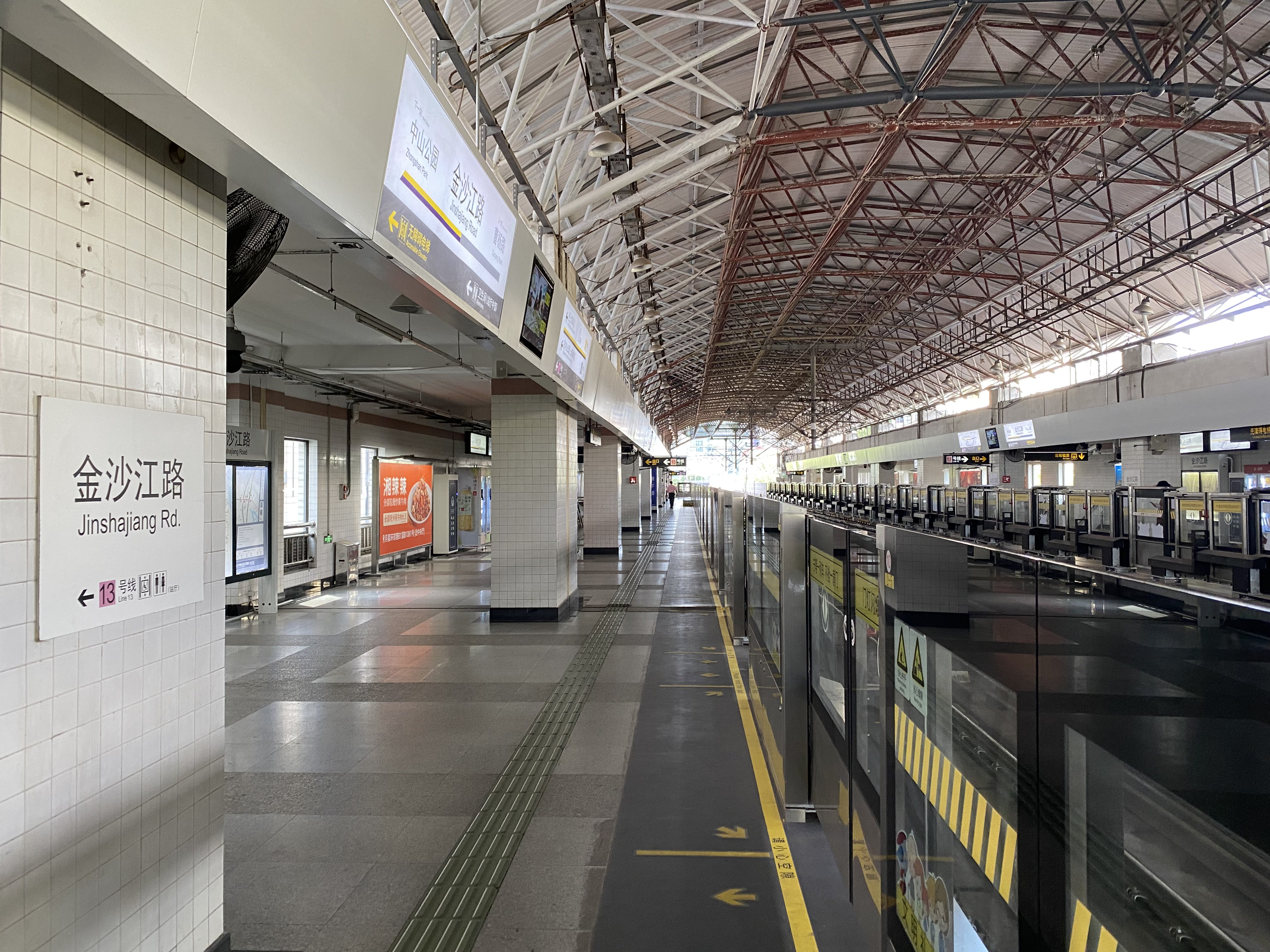
- Platform for Lines 3 and 4

General information
- Location: North Kaixuan Road (凯旋北路) and Ningxia Road (宁夏路); Putuo District, Shanghai; China
- Coordinates: 31°13′56″N 121°24′48″E
- Operator: Shanghai No. 2/3 Metro Operation Co. Ltd.
- Lines: Line 3; Line 4; Line 13
- Platforms: 4 (1 island platform for Line 13 and 2 side platforms for Lines 3 & 4)
- Tracks: 4

Construction
- Structure type: Elevated (Lines 3 & 4); Underground (Line 13)
- Accessible: Yes

History
- Opened: 26 December 2000; 25 years ago (Line 3); 31 December 2005; 20 years ago (Line 4); 30 December 2012; 13 years ago (Line 13)

Services
Preceding station	Shanghai Metro	Following station
Caoyang Road towards North Jiangyang Road	Line 3	Zhongshan Park towards Shanghai South Railway Station
Caoyang Road Clockwise	Line 4	Zhongshan Park Counter-clockwise
Daduhe Road towards Jinyun Road	Line 13	Longde Road towards Zhangjiang Road
Location
- Location within Shanghai

Jinshajiang Road (Chinese: 金沙江路; pinyin: Jīnshājiāng Lù) is an interchange station on Lines 3, 4, and 13 of the Shanghai Metro. It is located in Putuo District, Shanghai and is one of the stations where Lines 3 and 4 share tracks.

The station opened on 26 December 2000 as part of the initial section of Line 3 from Shanghai South Railway Station to Jiangwan Town, and Line 4 service began here on the final day of 2005. On 30 December 2012, the Line 13 portion of the Jinshajiang Road station began its test runs, providing service westbound towards Jinyun Road. Although service did not include mobile or Wi-Fi signals, the metro did provide service from this station to five stations in Jiading District, including Line 13's initial northern terminus, Jinyun Road.

The station served as the eastern terminus of Line 13 until the opening of the eastern extension to Changshou Road on 28 December 2014.

During the 2021 Shanghai People's Congress, deputies suggested to change the station name to East China Normal University. The naming the station Jinshajiang Road isn't ideal because none of its exits is on Jinshajiang Road and people might confuse it with the West Jinshajiang Road Station on Line 13.

== Location ==
The station is next to the Global Harbor shopping mall, which opened on 5 July 2013. It is attached directly to the mall underground. The station is also near East China Normal University's Putuo campus.

== Gallery ==
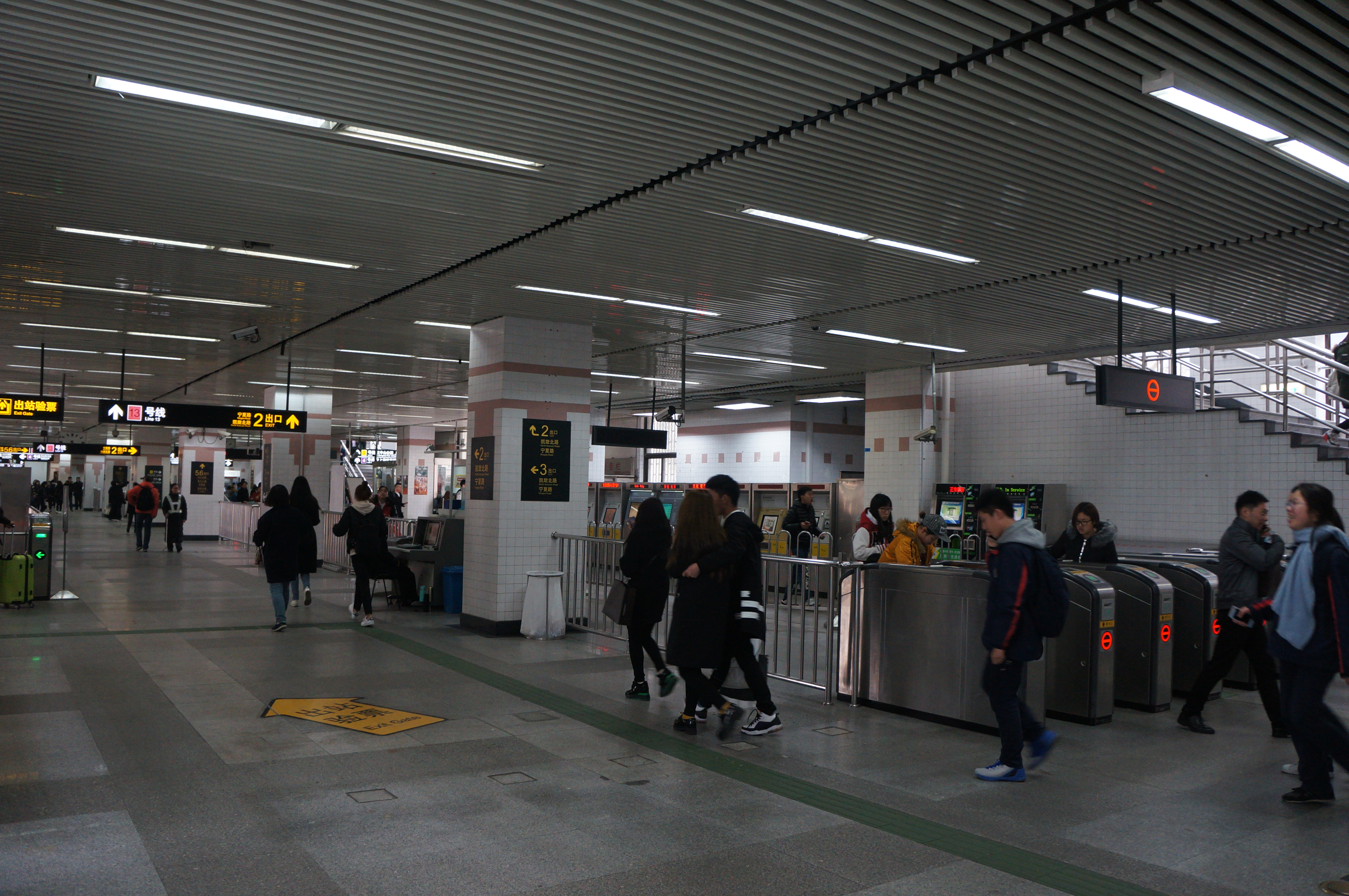
Concourse

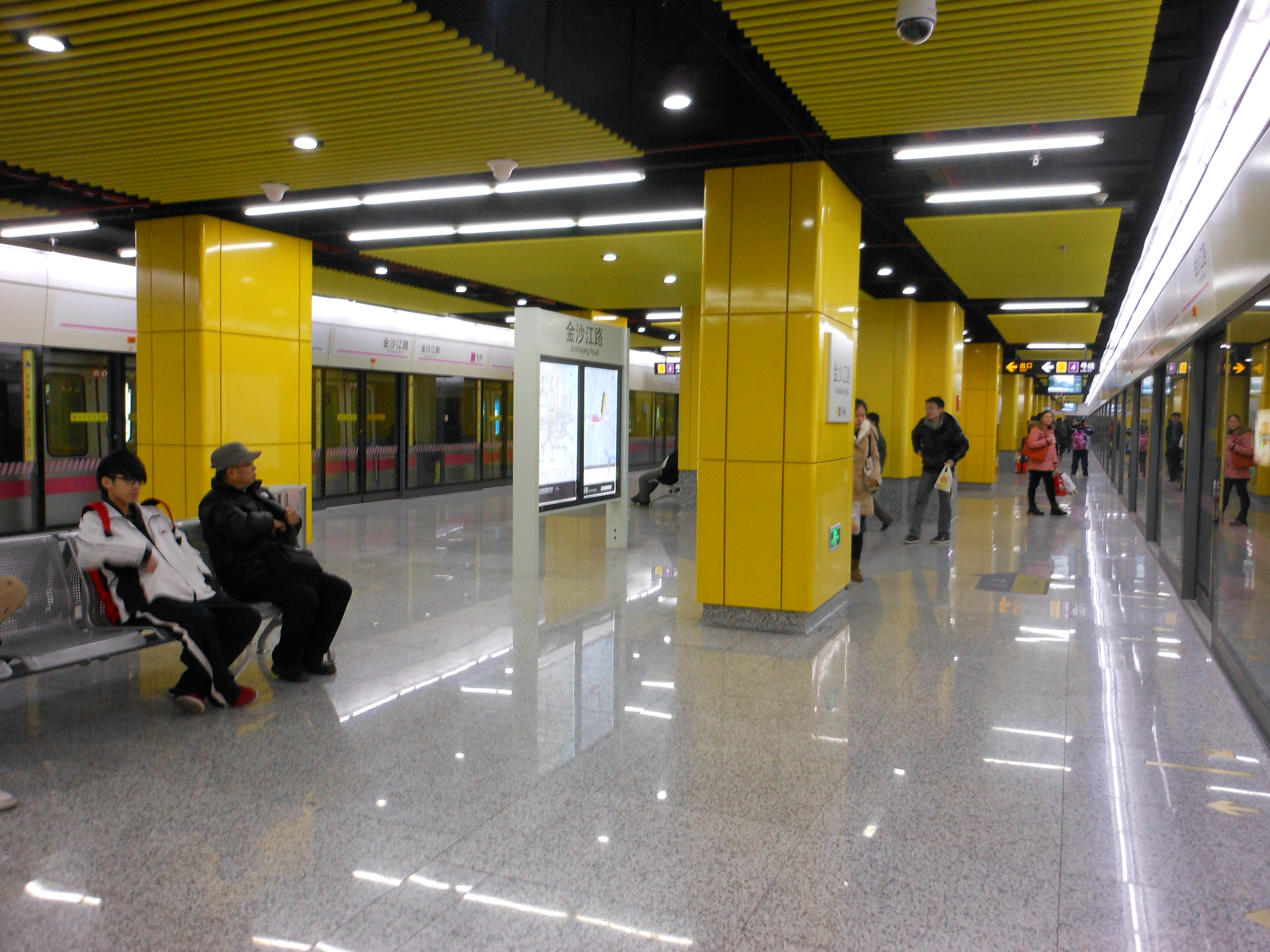
Line 13 platform

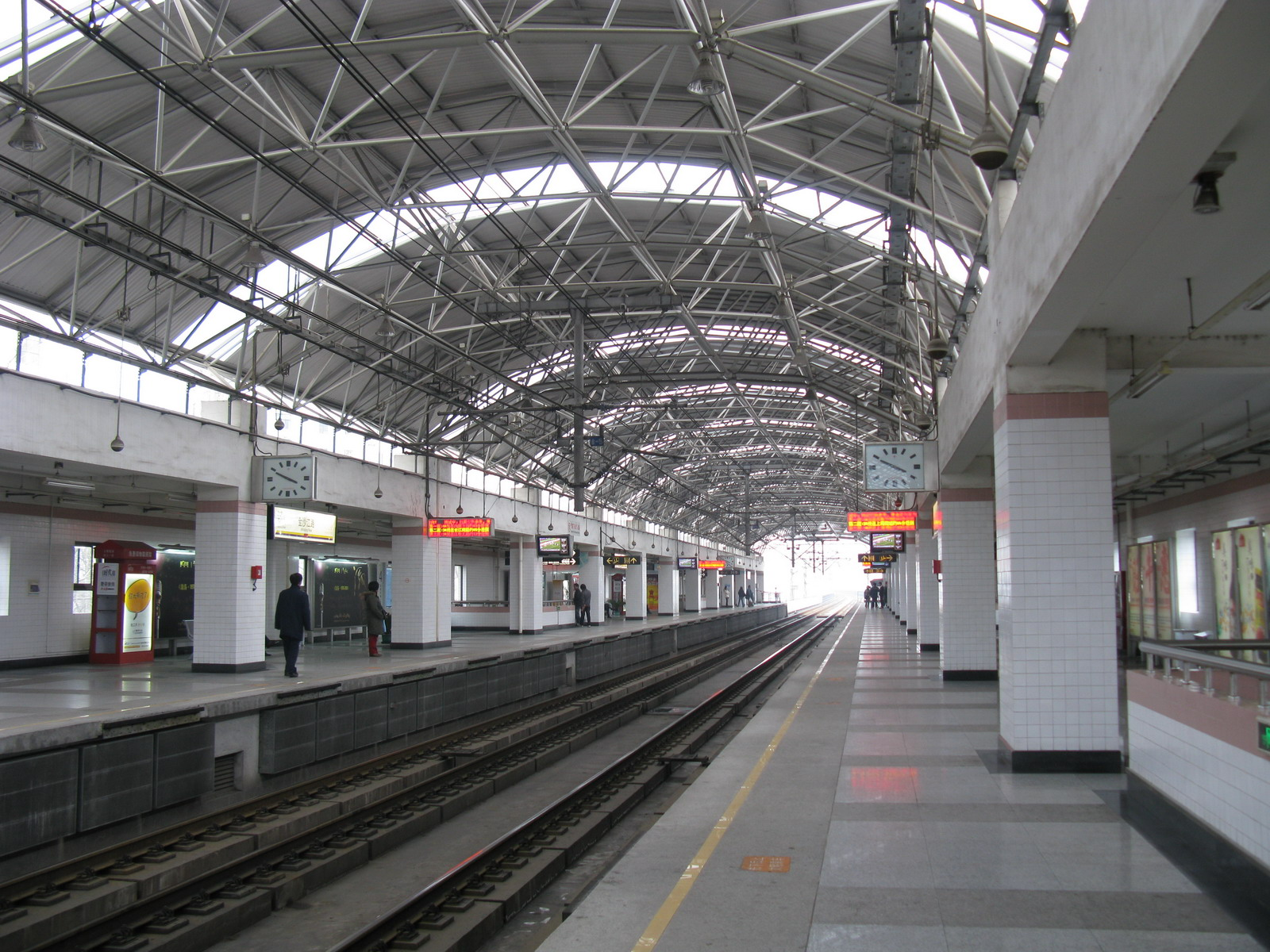
Platform for Lines 3 and 4 in 2009
