= Line 13 (Shanghai Metro) =

Metro line of the Shanghai Metro

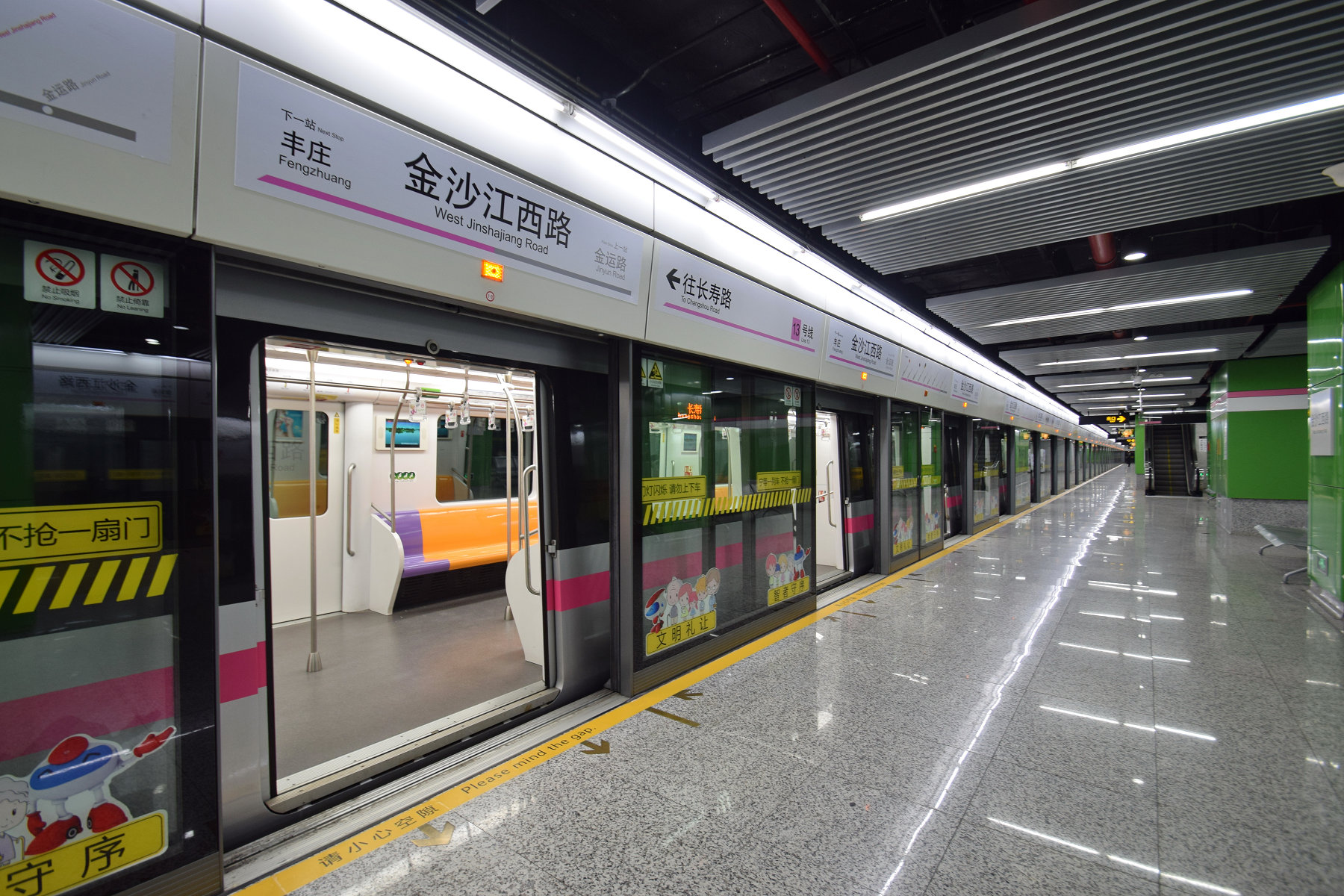
- Platform at West Jinshajiang Road

Overview
- Other name(s): M5 (planned name); Expo line (former name in 2010)
- Native name: 上海地铁13号线
- Status: Operational
- Owner: Shanghai Rail Transit Line 13 Development Co., Ltd.
- Locale: Pudong, Huangpu, Jing'an, Putuo, and Jiading districts, Shanghai, China
- Termini: Jinyun Road; Zhangjiang Road
- Stations: 36

Service
- Type: Rapid transit
- System: Shanghai Metro
- Services: Mainline: Jinyun Road ↔ Zhangjiang Road; Partial mainline: Jinyun Road ↔ Huapeng Road
- Operator: Shanghai No. 2 Metro Operation Co. Ltd.
- Depot(s): Beidi Road Depot; Chuanyang River Yard
- Rolling stock: 13A01; 13A02; 13A03
- Daily ridership: 737,800 (2019 peak)

History
- Work began: March 21, 2007; 19 years ago (Expo line section)
- Opened: April 20, 2010; 16 years ago (As Expo line from Madang Road to Shibo Avenue)
- Last extension: December 30, 2018; 7 years ago
- Closed: November 2, 2010; 15 years ago (Expo line)
- Reopened: December 30, 2012; 13 years ago

Technical
- Line length: 43.3 km (26.91 mi)
- Number of tracks: 2
- Character: Underground
- Track gauge: 1,435 mm (4 ft 8 1/2 in)
- Electrification: Overhead lines 1.5kV DC
- Operating speed: 80 km/h (50 mph); Average speed: 32.8 km/h (20 mph)
- Signalling: ALSTOM Urbalis CBTC
Route map
To scale geographic map:

Line 13 is a north-west to south-east line of the Shanghai Metro network. It runs between Jinyun Road in Jiading and Zhangjiang Road in Pudong. It was once used as a dedicated line (Expo line) for the World Expo to serve the 2010 Shanghai World Expo. The line is colored pink on system maps.

== History ==
=== Special Phase ===
The Special Phase of Line 13 operated between Madang Road and Shibo Avenue, during the 2010 Shanghai World Expo. Following the end of the Expo, this phase was closed. This part of the line reopened on December 19, 2015, along with the full opening of the line.

=== 1st Phase ===
The 1st Phase of Line 13 ran between all the stations between Jinyun Road and Jinshajiang Road, with 7 stations. The section opened in December 2012.

=== 2nd Phase and 3rd Phase ===
The two phases ran from Changqing Road to Zhangjiang Road in Zhangjiang Hi-Tech Park region. The rest of the line was opened on December 19, 2015.

Shanghai Metro Line 13 opening history
Segment	Commenced	Opened	Length	Station(s)	Name	Investment
Madang Road — Shibo Avenue	21 Mar 2007	20 Apr 2010	4.0 km (2.49 mi)	3	Expo line (special phase)	¥1.338 billion
Madang Road — Shibo Avenue	closed:	2 Nov 2010	Temporarily ceased operation	-3	Expo line (special phase)	¥1.338 billion
Jinyun Road — Jinshajiang Road	28 Dec 2008	30 Dec 2012	9.9 km (6.15 mi)	5	Phase 1 (1st section)	¥12.417 billion
South Qilianshan Road		15 Jun 2013	Infill station	1		¥12.417 billion
Daduhe Road		1 Nov 2014	Infill station	1		¥12.417 billion
Jinshajiang Road — Changshou Road	15 Nov 2011	28 Dec 2014	2.9 km (1.8 mi)	3	Phase 1 (2nd section)	¥12.417 billion
Changshou Road — West Nanjing Road	15 Nov 2011	19 Dec 2015	2.6 km (1.6 mi)	4	Phase 1 (3rd section)	¥12.417 billion
West Nanjing Road — Madang Road	20 Nov 2009	19 Dec 2015	2.8 km (1.7 mi)	2	Expo line (1st section)	¥4.521 billion
Madang Road — Shibo Avenue		19 Dec 2015	Re-entered operation	3	Expo line (1st section)
Shibo Avenue — Changqing Road		30 Dec 2018	1.0 km (0.6 mi)	1	Expo line (2nd section)
Changqing Road — Middle Huaxia Road	31 Dec 2013	30 Dec 2018	10.5 km (6.5 mi)	8	Phase 2	¥12.932 billion
Middle Huaxia Road — Zhangjiang Road	30 Mar 2014	30 Dec 2018	4.8 km (3.0 mi)	3	Phase 3
National Exhibition and Convention Center — Jinyun Road	28 Jun 2021	May 2027 (exp.)	9.8 km (6.1 mi)	5	West extension	¥12.629 billion
Zhangjiang Road — Dangui Road	28 May 2023	May 2027 (exp.)	4.52 km (2.8 mi)	2	East extension

== Stations ==
=== Service routes ===
Shanghai Metro Line 13 service routes
M - Mainline: Jinyun Road ↔ Zhangjiang Road; P - Partial mainline: Jinyun Road ↔ Huapeng Road
Routes		Station name		Connections	Distance			Location	Open- ing	Plat- form
M	P	English	Chinese	Connections	km		min	Location	Open- ing	Plat- form
		National Exhibition and Convention Center	国家会展中心	2 17	0.00	0.00	0	Qingpu	Expected opening in May 2027	Underground Island
		Yunle Road	运乐路		1.781	1.781		Qingpu	Expected opening in May 2027	Underground Island
		Jile Road	季乐路		1.120	2.901		Qingpu	Expected opening in May 2027	Underground Island
		Qianwan Park	前湾公园		0.996	3.897		Qingpu	Expected opening in May 2027	Underground Island
		Jidi Road	纪翟路		1.443	5.340		Qingpu	Expected opening in May 2027	Underground Island
●	●	Jinyun Road	金运路		0.00	0.00	0	Jiading	30 Dec 2012
●	●	West Jinshajiang Road	金沙江西路		1.52	1.52	3	Jiading	30 Dec 2012
●	●	Fengzhuang	丰庄		1.94	3.46	6	Jiading	30 Dec 2012
●	●	South Qilianshan Road	祁连山南路		1.31	4.77	8	Putuo	15 June 2013
●	●	Zhenbei Road	真北路		1.48	6.25	11	Putuo	30 Dec 2012
●	●	Daduhe Road	大渡河路	15	1.24	7.49	13	Putuo	1 Nov 2014
●	●	Jinshajiang Road	金沙江路	3 4	1.62	9.11	16	Putuo	30 Dec 2012	Underground Island
●	●	Longde Road	隆德路	11	1.21	10.32	18	Putuo	28 Dec 2014	Underground Island
●	●	Wuning Road	武宁路	14	0.85	11.17	20	Putuo	28 Dec 2014	Underground Island
●	●	Changshou Road	长寿路	7	1.08	12.25	22	Putuo	28 Dec 2014	Underground Island
●	●	Jiangning Road	江宁路		0.70	12.95	24	Putuo	19 Dec 2015	Underground Island
●	●	Hanzhong Road	汉中路	1 12	1.63	14.58	27	Jing'an	19 Dec 2015	Underground Island
●	●	Shanghai Natural History Museum	自然博物馆		0.65	15.23	28	Jing'an	19 Dec 2015	Underground Island
●	●	West Nanjing Road	南京西路	2 12 (Note: Virtual transfer with line 2 or line 12 – passengers who hold the Shanghai Public Transportation Card and transfer within 30 minutes of exiting the station are able to transfer to other lines without exiting the system.)	0.86	16.09	31	Jing'an	19 Dec 2015	Underground Side
●	●	Middle Huaihai Road	淮海中路		0.96	17.05	33	Huangpu	19 Dec 2015	Underground Island
●	●	Site of the First CPC National Congress · Xintiandi	一大会址·新天地	10	1.21	18.26	35	Huangpu	19 Dec 2015	Underground Island
●	●	Madang Road	马当路	9	0.63	18.89	37	Huangpu	20 Apr 2010/ 19 Dec 2015 (Note: 20 April 2010－2 November 2010: (as the Expo 2010 line).)	Underground Island
●	●	World Expo Museum	世博会博物馆		1.53	20.42	40	Huangpu	20 Apr 2010/ 19 Dec 2015	Underground Island
●	●	Shibo Avenue	世博大道		1.61	22.03	42	Pudong	20 Apr 2010/ 19 Dec 2015	Underground Side & Island
●	●	Changqing Road	长清路	7 (Note: Virtual transfer with line 7 – passengers who hold the Shanghai Public Transportation Card and transfer within 30 minutes of exiting the station are able to transfer to other lines without exiting the system.)	0.89	22.92	44	Pudong	30 Dec 2018	Underground Island
●	●	Chengshan Road	成山路	8	1.16	24.08	46	Pudong	30 Dec 2018	Underground Island
●	●	Dongming Road	东明路	6	1.40	25.48	48	Pudong	30 Dec 2018	Underground Island
●	●	Huapeng Road	华鹏路		1.15	26.63	51	Pudong	30 Dec 2018	Underground Island
●		Xia'nan Road	下南路		1.82	28.45	53	Pudong	30 Dec 2018	Underground Island
●		Beicai	北蔡		1.07	29.52	56	Pudong	30 Dec 2018	Underground Island
●		Chenchun Road	陈春路		0.93	30.45	58	Pudong	30 Dec 2018	Underground Island
●		Lianxi Road	莲溪路	18	1.34	31.79	60	Pudong	30 Dec 2018	Underground Island
●		Middle Huaxia Road	华夏中路	16	1.77	33.56	62	Pudong	30 Dec 2018	Underground Double Island
●		Zhongke Road	中科路		1.06	34.62	65	Pudong	30 Dec 2018	Underground Island
●		Xuelin Road	学林路		1.96	36.58	68	Pudong	30 Dec 2018	Underground Island
●		Zhangjiang Road	张江路		1.69	38.27	70	Pudong	30 Dec 2018	Underground Island
		Middle Gaoke Road	高科中路					Pudong	u/c since 28 May 2023; Expected opning May 2027	Underground Island
		Dangui Road	丹桂路					Pudong	u/c since 28 May 2023; Expected opning May 2027	Underground Island

=== Important Stations ===
- West Nanjing Road - located under the busy Nanjing Road. Interchange with lines 2 and 12.
- Jinshajiang Road - located near East China Normal University and Global Harbor. Interchange with lines 3 and 4.
- Site of the First CPC National Congress · Xintiandi - located by Xintiandi Style Mall and the renovated Xintiandi Shikumen neighborhood. Interchange with line 10.

=== Future Expansion ===
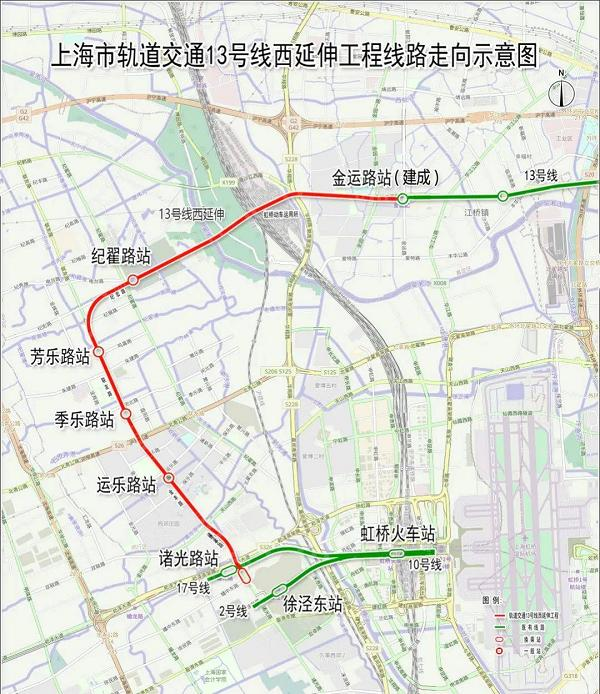
Shanghai Metro Line 13 West Extension

West extension: It will be extended for 9.47 km (5.88 mi) from Jinyun Road station to National Exhibition and Convention Center station on Line 17 and add 5 stations. The stations are: Jizhai Road station; Fangle Road station; Jile Road station; Yunle Road station; and National Exhibition and Convention Center station. Riders can change onto Line 17 and Line 2 (out of station transfer) at the terminus. Construction started on June 28, 2021 and will open by May 2027.

East extension: is part of Phase III adjustment and starts from the current Zhangjiang Road station and ends at Zhangjiang Jidian Port (area), mainly along Zhangdong Road, with a line length of about 4.1 kilometres (2.5 mi). Both are underground lines with 2 stations. Construction started on May 28, 2023 and will open by May 2027.

=== Station name change ===
- On September 18, 2014, Lupu Bridge was renamed the World Expo Museum.
- On June 20, 2021, Xintiandi was renamed as the Site of the First CPC National Congress · Xintiandi.

== Headways ==
Shanghai Metro Line 13 headway
Time		Jinyun Road - Huapeng Road	Huapeng Road - Zhangjiang Road
Monday - Friday (Working Days)
AM peak	7:30–9:30	About 2 min and 30 sec	About 5 min
Off-peak	9:30–17:00	About 6 min
PM peak	17:00–19:30	About 3 min	About 6 min
Other hours	Before 7:30 After 19:30	About 6 – 10 min
Saturday and Sunday (Weekends)
Peak	8:30–20:30	About 5 min
Other hours	Before 8:30 After 20:30	About 6 - 10 min
Extended Operation Interval (Friday, Saturday)
	After 22:30	About 15 min ~ 20 min

== Technology ==
=== Rolling Stock ===
The trains of Line 13 are composed of 6-carriages Class A cars, with a design speed of 80 km/h (50 mph), VVVF AC drive, and a design life of 30 years and are China's first domestically developed trains. Trains have a capacity of about 1,860 people. Carriages are 23.54 metres (77 ft 3 in) in length, 3.0 metres (9 ft 10 in) in width, and 3.8 metres (12 ft 6 in) in height.

09A02 trains (numbers 0942–0945, 0948) were used on Line 13, only used during the 2010 Shanghai World Expo, which were reassigned from line 9 to line 13, all of which have now been transferred back to line 9.

Shanghai Metro Line 13 rolling stock
Fleet numbers	Manufacturer	Time of manufac- turing	Class	No of car	Assembly (Note: Tc: Trailer with cab; Mp: EMU with pantograph; M: EMU without pantograph.)	Rolling stock	Number	Notes
144	CRRC Nanjing Puzhen Co., Ltd.	2011-2014	A (Note: Class A carriage: 21-24m in length, 3.0m in width and 3.8m in height; Capacity: about 310 people.)	6	Tc+Mp+M+M+Mp+Tc	13A01	1301-1324 (130011-131441)	Original name: AC18.
228	CRRC Nanjing Puzhen Co., Ltd.	2016-2018	A	6	Tc+Mp+M+M+Mp+Tc	13A02	1325-1362 (131451-133721)
114	CRRC Nanjing Puzhen Co., Ltd.	2024-2026	A	6	Tc+Mp+M+M+Mp+Tc	13A03	13063-13071; 13083-13092 (133731-134261, 134931-135521)

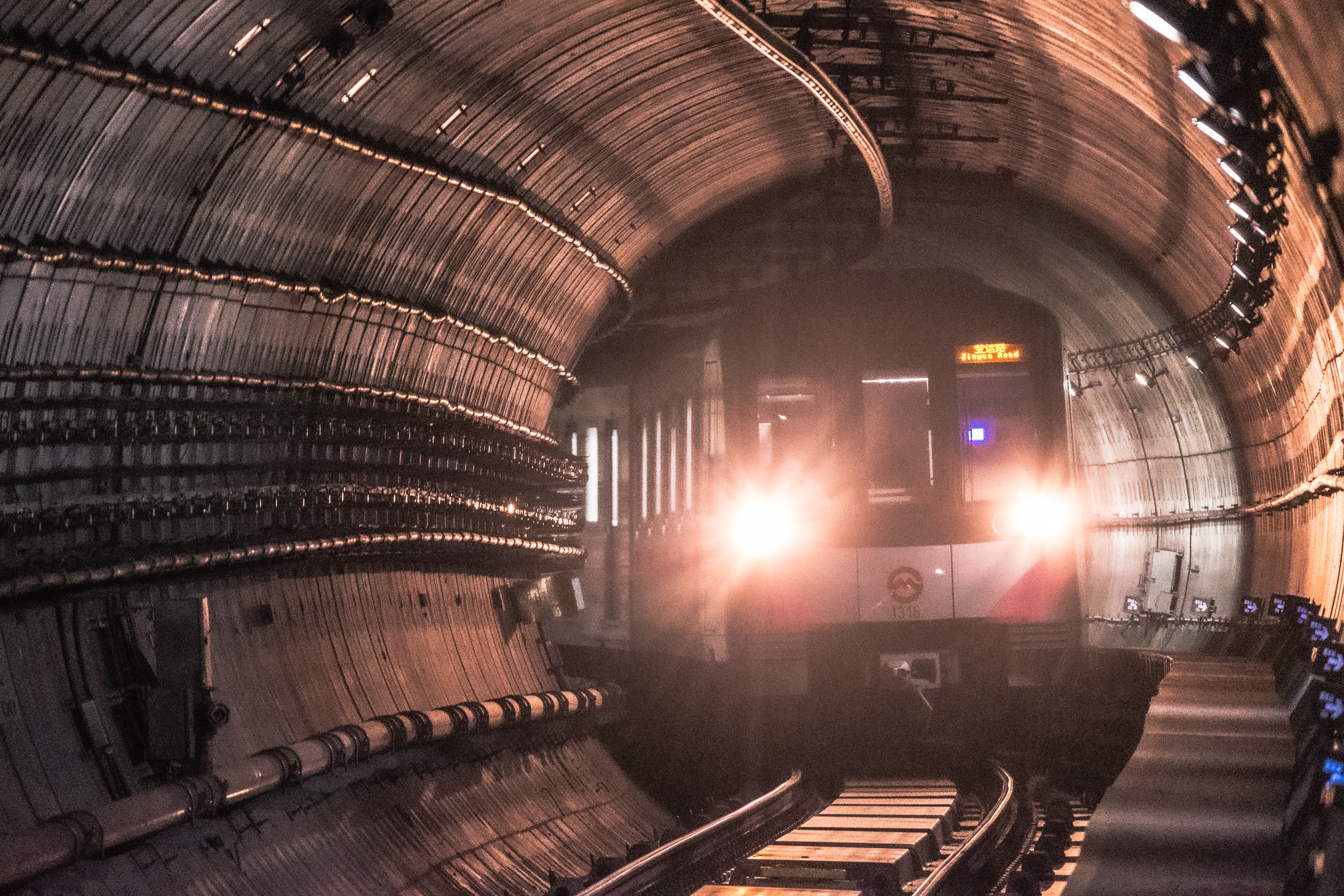
13A01 train

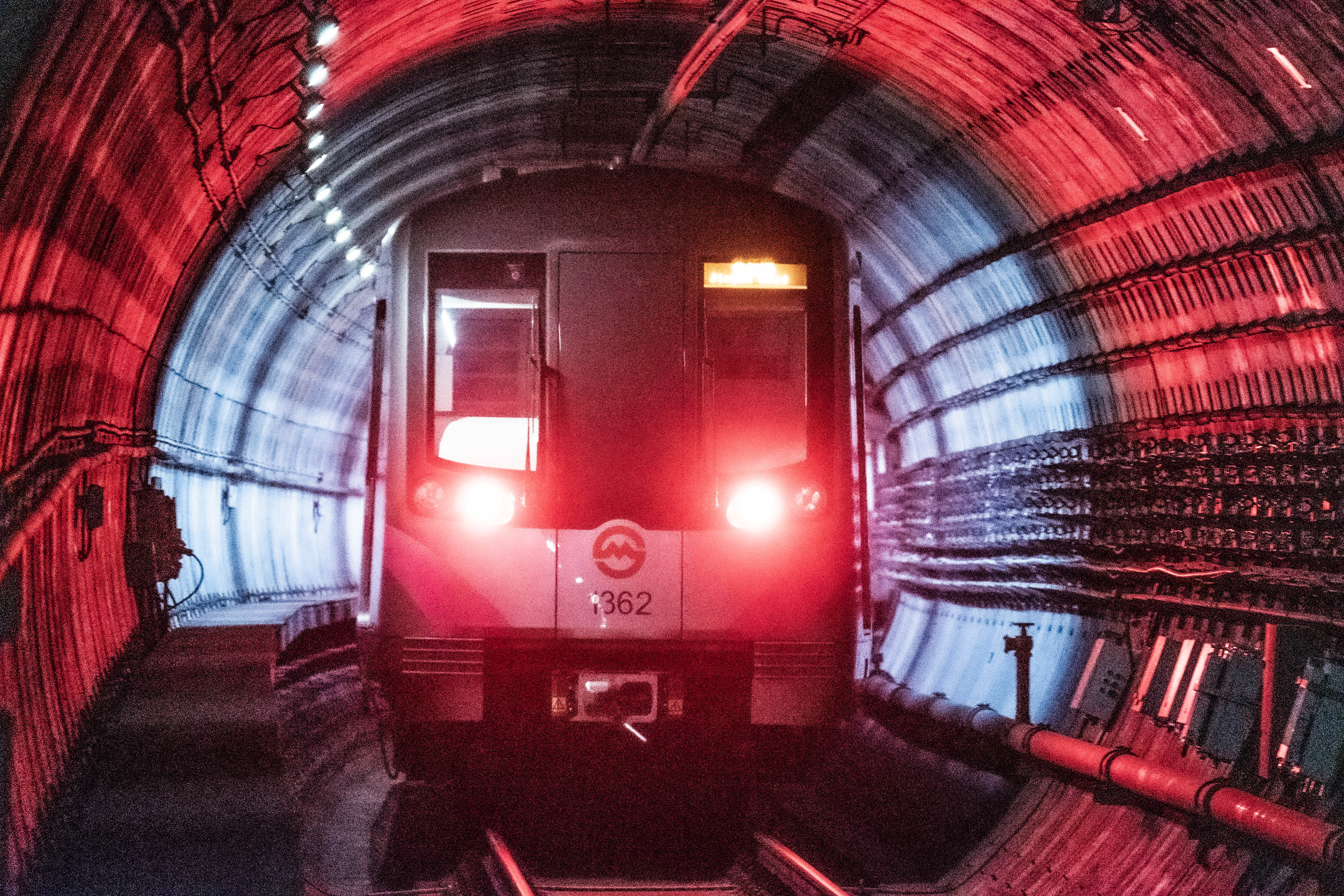
13A02 train
