= Jinyun Road station =

Shanghai Metro station

Jinyun Road 金运路
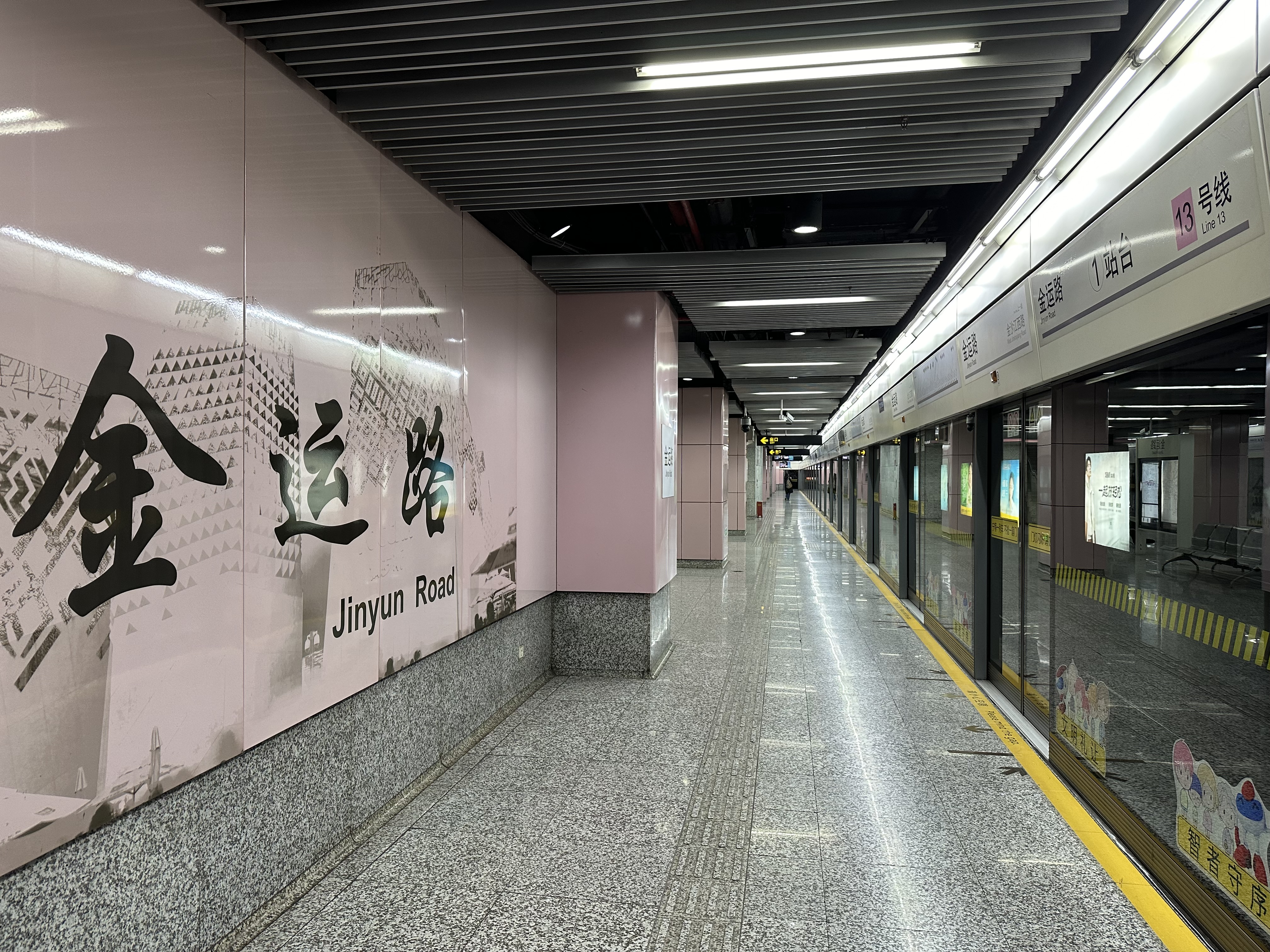
- Station platform

General information
- Location: West Jinshajiang Road (金沙江西路) and Jinyun Road (金运路); Jiangqiao, Jiading District, Shanghai; China
- Coordinates: 31°14′34.89″N 121°18′54.00″E
- Operated by: Shanghai No. 2 Metro Operation Co., Ltd.
- Line: Line 13
- Platforms: 2 (1 island platform)
- Tracks: 2

Construction
- Structure type: Underground
- Accessible: Yes

History
- Opened: 30 December 2012

Services
| Preceding station | Shanghai Metro | Following station |
|---|---|---|
| Terminus | Line 13 | West Jinshajiang Road towards Zhangjiang Road |
Location

Jinyun Road (simplified Chinese: 金运路; traditional Chinese: 金運路; pinyin: Jīnyùn Lù) is the current western terminus station on Line 13 of the Shanghai Metro. It is located in Jiading District, Shanghai.

On 30 December 2012, Line 13 began its test runs, providing service westbound towards Jinyun Road and eastbound to Jinshajiang Road. Although service did not include mobile or Wi-Fi signals, the metro did provide stops to five stations in Jiading District.
