= Zhangjiang Road station =

Metro station in Shanghai, China

Zhangjiang Road 张江路
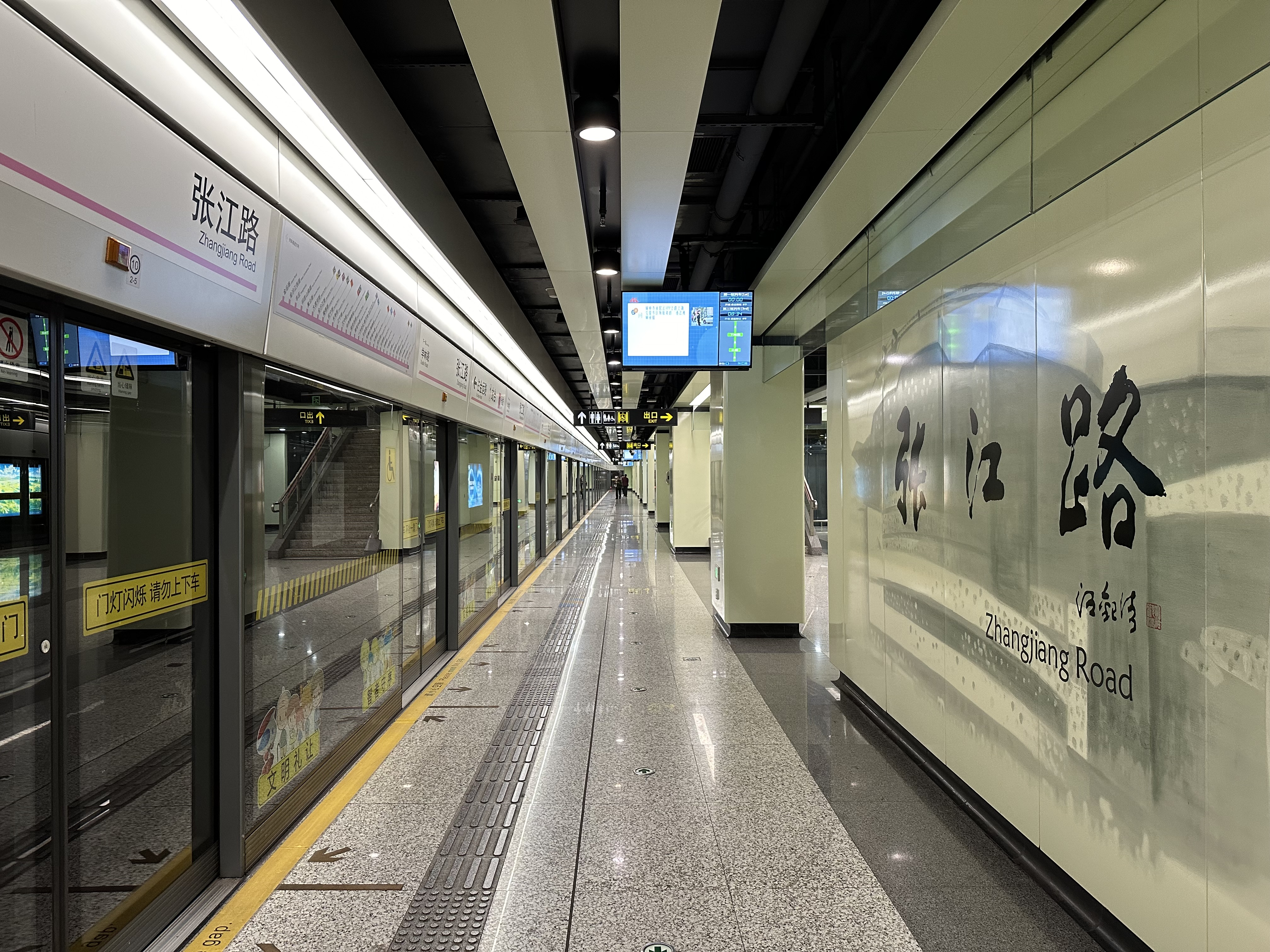
- Station platform

General information
- Location: Zhongke Road and Zhangjiang Road, Pudong, Shanghai; China
- Coordinates: 31.1914°N 121.6258°E
- Operated by: Shanghai No. 2 Metro Operation Co. Ltd.
- Line: Line 13
- Platforms: 2 (1 island platform)
- Tracks: 2

Construction
- Structure type: Underground
- Accessible: Yes

History
- Opened: 30 December 2018

Services
Preceding station	Shanghai Metro	Following station
Xuelin Road towards Jinyun Road	Line 13	Terminus
Location

Zhangjiang Road (simplified Chinese: 张江路; traditional Chinese: 張江路; pinyin: Zhāngjiāng Lù) is a station on Line 13 of the Shanghai Metro, and is the current eastern terminus of the line. Located at Zhongke Road and Zhangjiang Road in Pudong, Shanghai, the station opened with the phases 2 and 3 extensions of Line 13 on 30 December 2018.
