= Jinqiu Road station =

Metro station in Shanghai, China

Jinqiu Road 锦秋路
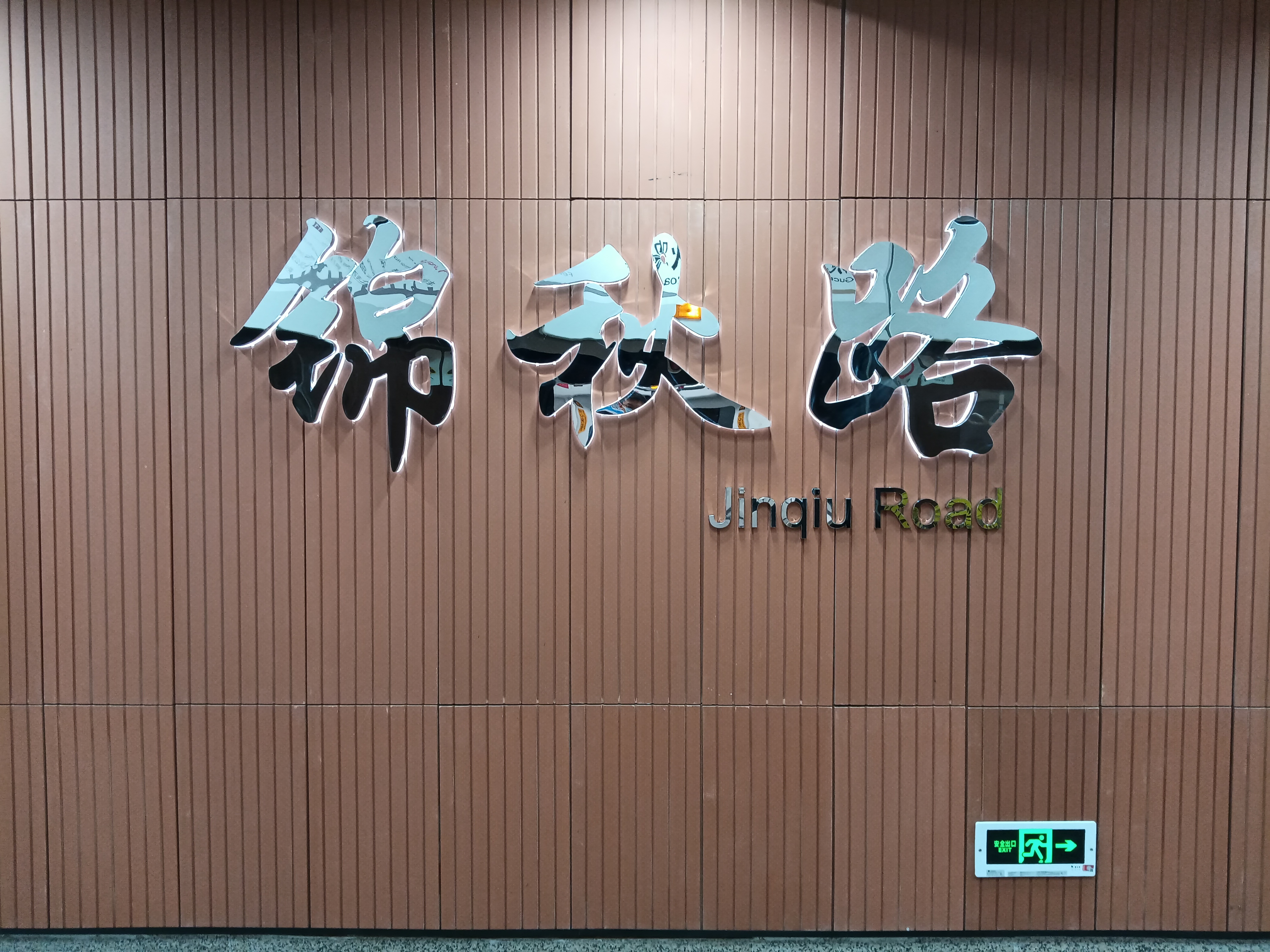
- Platform Sign

General information
- Location: Qilianshan Road and Jinqiu Road, Baoshan District, Shanghai; China
- Coordinates: 31.3226228°N 121.37745°E
- Line: Line 15
- Platforms: 2 (1 island platform)
- Tracks: 2

Construction
- Structure type: Underground
- Accessible: Yes

History
- Opened: 23 January 2021

Services
Preceding station	Shanghai Metro	Following station
Gucun Park Terminus	Line 15	Fengxiang Road towards Zizhu Hi-tech Park
Location

Jinqiu Road (simplified Chinese: 锦秋路; traditional Chinese: 錦秋路; pinyin: Jǐnqiū Lù) is a metro station on the Line 15 of the Shanghai Metro. Located at the intersection of Qilianshan Road and Jinqiu Road in Putuo District, Shanghai, the station was scheduled to open with the rest of Line 15 by the end of 2020. However, the station eventually opened on 23 January 2021 following a one-month postponement. It is located in between Gucun Park station to the north and Fengxiang Road station to the south.

Although Jinqiu Road station is situated on the spot where Shanghai Metro Line 7 intersects with Line 15 as the former travels underneath Jinqiu Road, there is no interchange available to Line 7 as it is located midway between two Line 7 stations, Qihua Road and Shanghai University. Originally, the northern terminus of Line 15 was intended to be at Qihua Road. However, on 28 December 2011, Line 15 was shifted to instead terminate at Jinqiu Road station, which would provide no direct connection to Line 7. This has stirred controversy among residents over Line 15's already lack of convenient connections with other major metro lines such as Line 2 and Line 10. Planners reconsidered and extended Line 15 north by one station in order to connect with Line 7 at Gucun Park. Passengers who wish to interchange between Lines 7 and 15 must use Gucun Park station, even though the closest Line 7 station from Jinqiu Road is Shanghai University. It remains to be seen whether an out-of-station transfer will be allowed between the two stations.
