= Fanghua Road station =

Shanghai Metro station

Fanghua Road 芳华路
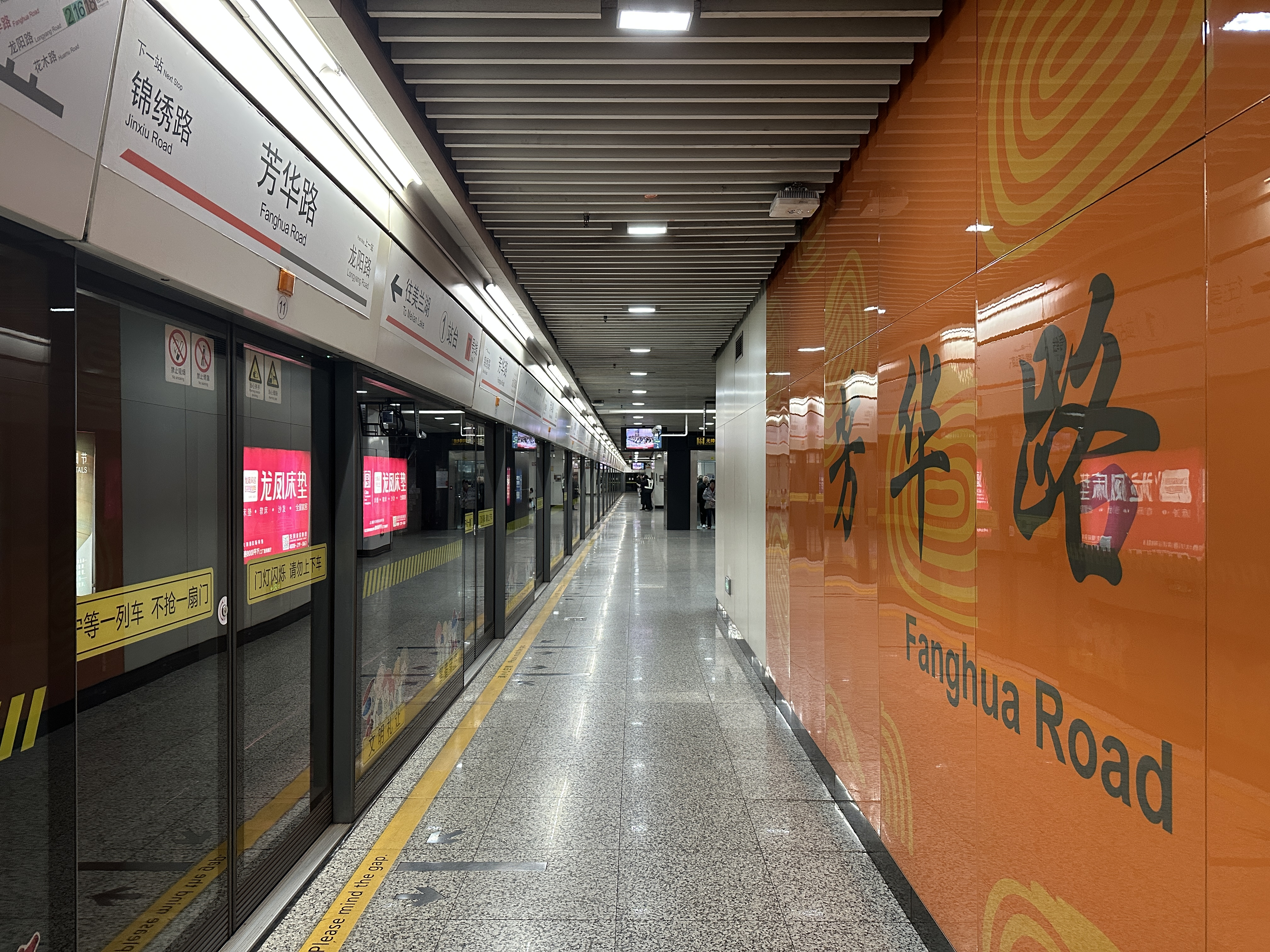
- Station platform

General information
- Location: Hunan Road (沪南路) and Fanghua Road (芳华路); Huamu Subdistrict, Pudong New Area, Shanghai; China
- Coordinates: 31°11′44″N 121°32′45″E
- Operated by: Shanghai No. 3 Metro Operation Co. Ltd.
- Line: Line 7
- Platforms: 2 (1 island platform)
- Tracks: 2

Construction
- Structure type: Underground
- Accessible: Yes

History
- Opened: December 5, 2009

Services
Preceding station	Shanghai Metro	Following station
Jinxiu Road towards Meilan Lake	Line 7	Longyang Road towards Huamu Road
Location

Fanghua Road (simplified Chinese: 芳华路; traditional Chinese: 芳華路; pinyin: Fānghuá Lù), formerly known as Hunan Road Station (沪南路; 滬南路; Hùnán Lù), is a station on Line 7 of the Shanghai Metro. It began operation on December 5, 2009. The station is located in Pudong New Area.
