= Liuhang station =

Metro station in Shanghai, China

Liuhang 刘行
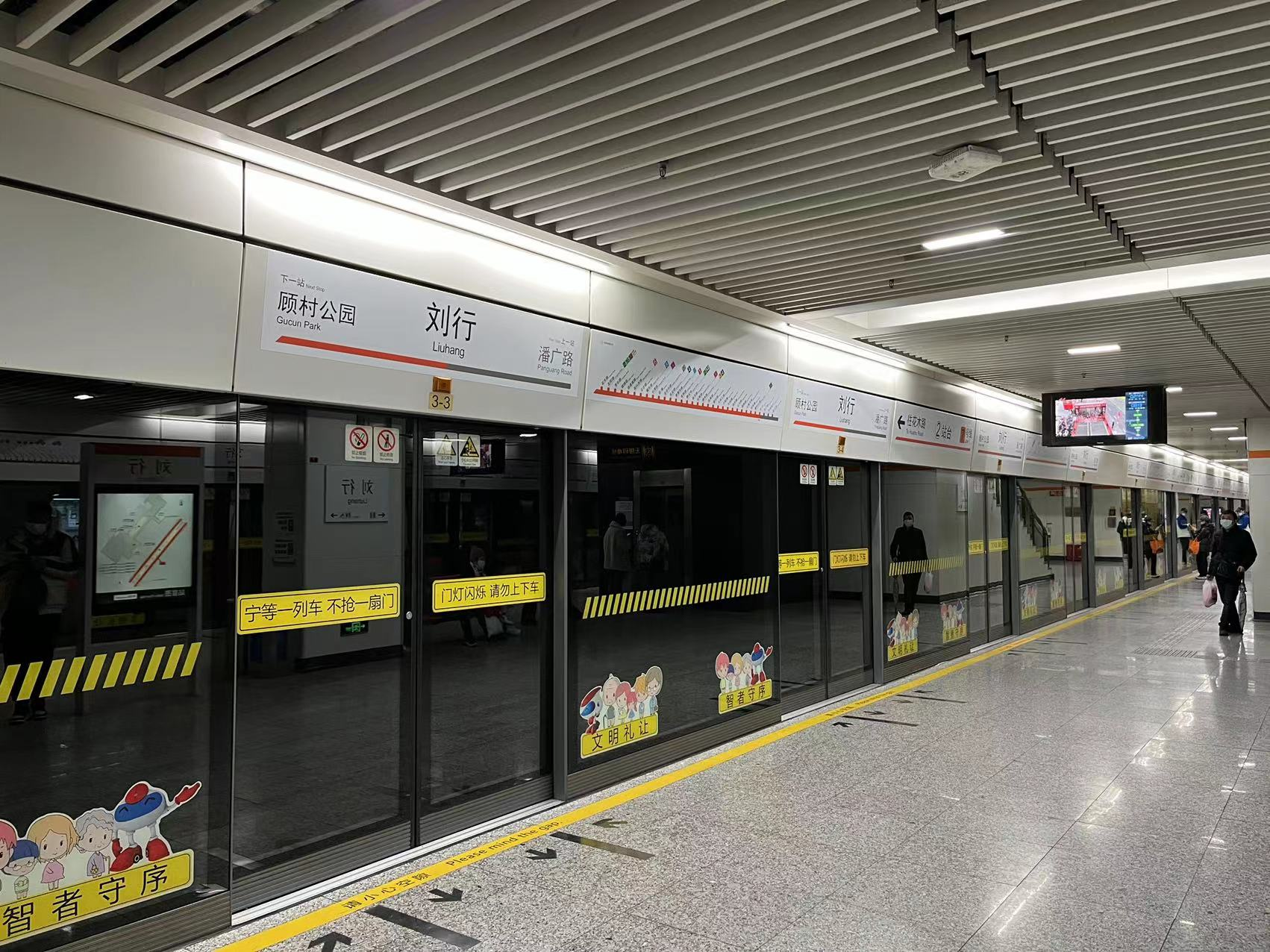

General information
- Location: Shanghai; China
- Coordinates: 31°21′32″N 121°21′28″E
- Line: Line 7
- Platforms: 2 (1 island platform)
- Tracks: 2

Construction
- Structure type: Underground
- Accessible: Yes

History
- Opened: 30 June 2011

Services
| Preceding station | Shanghai Metro | Following station |
|---|---|---|
| Panguang Road towards Meilan Lake | Line 7 | Gucun Park towards Huamu Road |
Location

Liuhang (Chinese: 刘行) is a station on Line 7 of the Shanghai Metro, located in Baoshan District. It opened on June 30, 2011, half a year later than the opening of the phase 2 northern extension of the line.
