= Houtan station =

Shanghai Metro station

Houtan 后滩
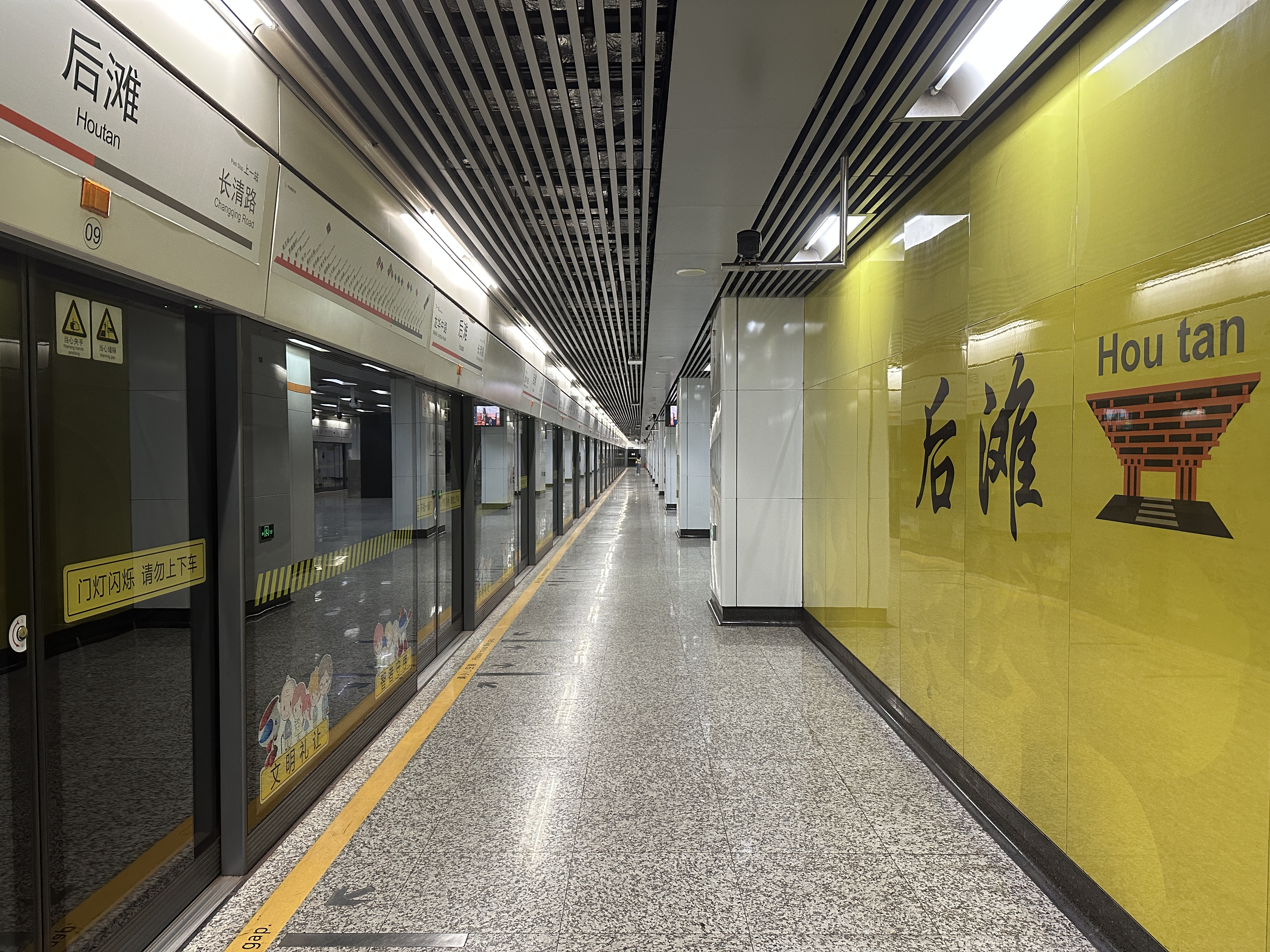
- Station platform

General information
- Location: Pudong New Area, Shanghai; China
- Coordinates: 31.1742°N 121.469°E
- Operated by: Shanghai No. 3 Metro Operation Co. Ltd.
- Line: Line 7
- Platforms: 2 (1 island platform)
- Tracks: 2

Construction
- Structure type: Underground
- Accessible: Yes

History
- Opened: 20 April 2010
- Previous names: Pujiang Yaohua

Services
Preceding station	Shanghai Metro	Following station
Middle Longhua Road towards Meilan Lake	Line 7	Changqing Road towards Huamu Road
Location

Houtan (simplified Chinese: 后滩; traditional Chinese: 後灘; pinyin: Hòutān), formerly Pujiang Yaohua Station, is a station on Line 7 of the Shanghai Metro. It opened in April 2010, 3 months later than the rest of the stations on the line.

The station is located in Pudong New Area and was one of the stations that was a part of the Expo 2010 zone.
