= Nanchen Road station =

Shanghai Metro station

Nanchen Road 南陈路
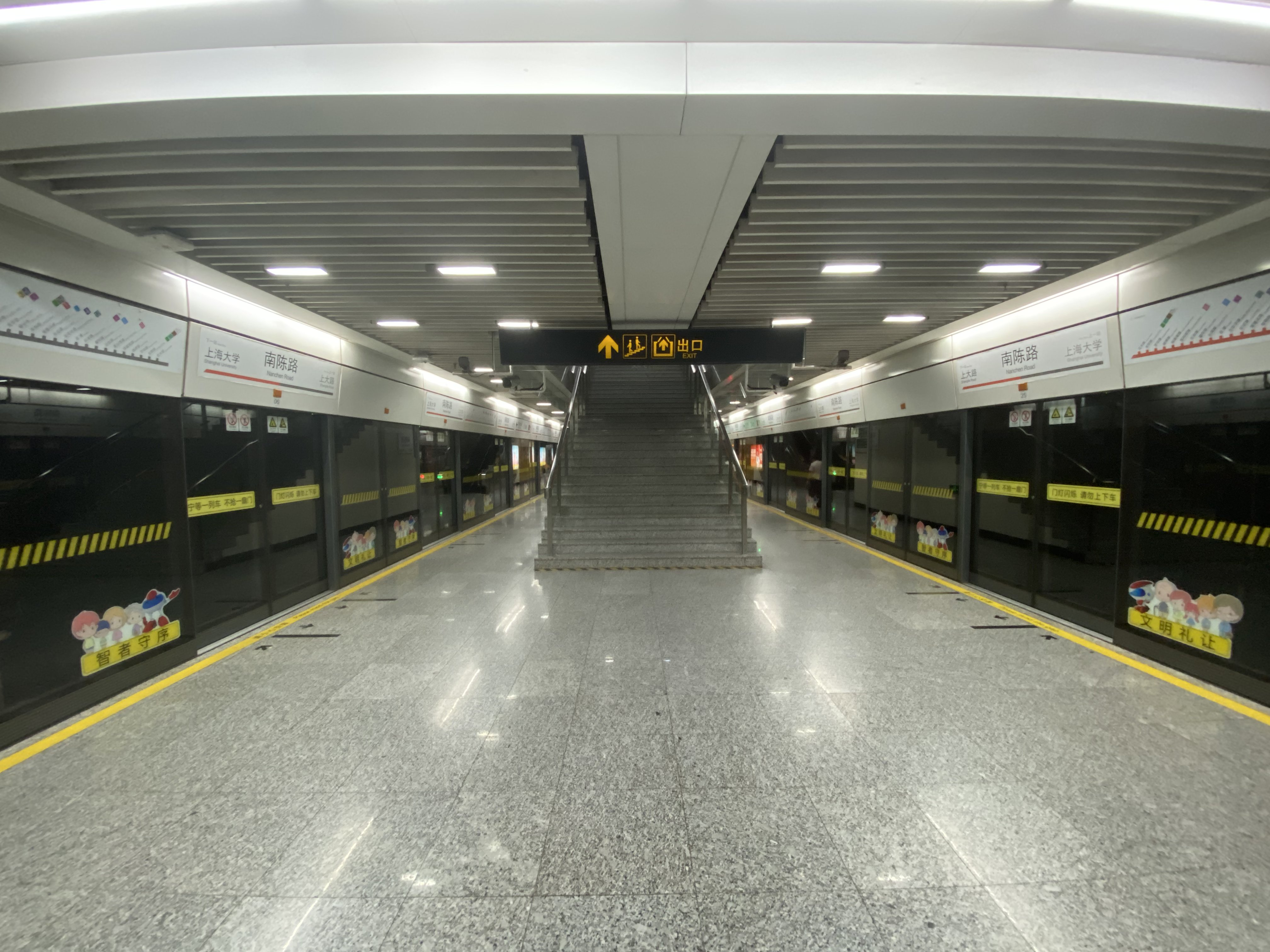
- Station platform

General information
- Location: Jinqiu Road (锦秋路) and Nanchen Road (南陈路); Baoshan District, Shanghai; China
- Coordinates: 31.32333°N 121.39306°E
- Operated by: Shanghai No. 3 Metro Operation Co. Ltd.
- Line: Line 7
- Platforms: 2 (1 island platform)
- Tracks: 2

Construction
- Structure type: Underground
- Accessible: Yes

History
- Opened: December 5, 2009

Services
Preceding station	Shanghai Metro	Following station
Shanghai University towards Meilan Lake	Line 7	Shangda Road towards Huamu Road
Location

Nanchen Road (simplified Chinese: 南陈路; traditional Chinese: 南陳路; pinyin: Nánchén Lù) is a station on Shanghai Metro Line 7. It began operation on December 5, 2009. The station serves Shanghai University's Baoshan campus.
