= Changqing Road station =

Shanghai Metro station

Changqing Road 长清路
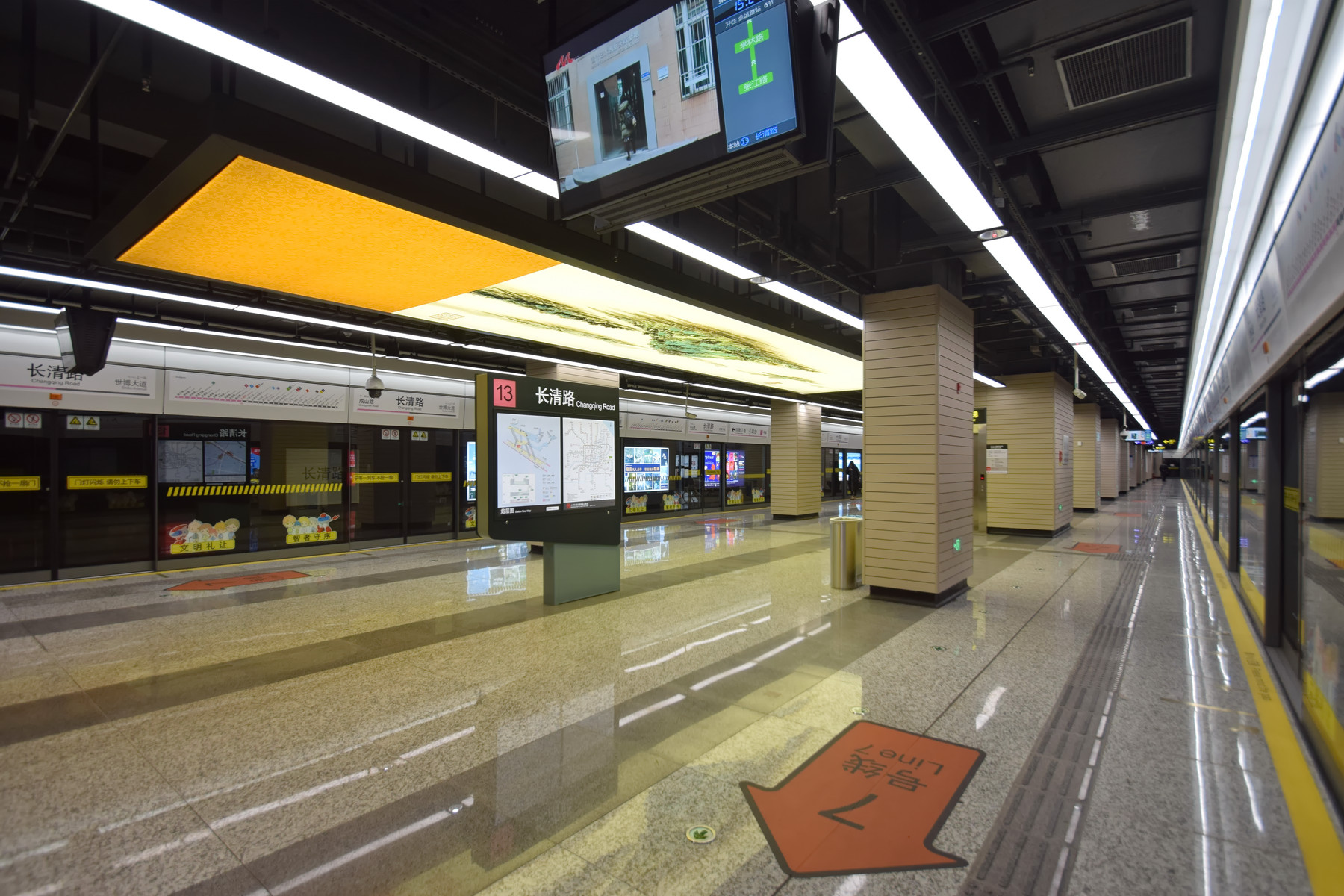
- Line 13 platform

General information
- Location: Pudong New Area, Shanghai; China
- Coordinates: 31.1772°N 121.483°E
- Operator: Shanghai No. 3 Metro Operation Co., Ltd. (Line 7); SHanghai No. 2 Metro Operation Co., Ltd. (Line 13)
- Lines: Line 7; Line 13
- Platforms: 4 (2 island platforms)
- Tracks: 4
- Connections: Bus routes 82, 83, 314, 338, 454, 572, 572区间, 604, 627, 734, 781, 786, 787, 818, 871, 974, 隧道一线, 隧道二线, 隧道七线, 隧道夜宵一线, 万周专线

Construction
- Structure type: Underground
- Accessible: Yes

History
- Opened: 5 December 2009 (Line 7); 30 December 2018 (Line 13)

Services
| Preceding station | Shanghai Metro | Following station |
|---|---|---|
| Houtan towards Meilan Lake | Line 7 | Yaohua Road towards Huamu Road |
| Shibo Avenue towards Jinyun Road | Line 13 | Chengshan Road towards Zhangjiang Road |
Location

Changqing Road (simplified Chinese: 长清路; traditional Chinese: 長清路; pinyin: Chángqīng Lù) is an interchange station on Lines 7 and 13 of the Shanghai Metro. It opened on 5 December 2009 as a Line 7 station. With the opening of phases two and three of Line 13 on 30 December 2018, it became a virtual interchange station between Lines 7 and 13. Passengers who hold the Shanghai Public Transportation Card and transfer within 30 minutes of exiting the station are able to transfer here to continue their journey.

The station is located near the junction of Changqing Road and Yaohua Road, just outside the Shanghai Expo 2010 zone.

== Station Layout ==
| G | Entrances and Exits | Exits 1-7 |
| B1 | Line 7 Concourse | Faregates, Station Agent |
| B1 | Line 13 Upper Concourse | Faregates, Station Agent |
| B2 | Line 13 Lower Concourse | Faregates, Station Agent |
| B2 | Northbound | ← Line 7 towards Meilan Lake (Houtan) |
| B2 | Island platform, doors open on the left |
| B2 | Southbound | Line 7 towards Huamu Road (Yaohua Road) → |
| B3 | Westbound | ← Line 13 towards Jinyun Road (Shibo Avenue) |
| B3 | Island platform, doors open on the left |
| B3 | Eastbound | Line 13 towards Zhangjiang Road (Chengshan Road) → |

== Gallery ==
Exit 2

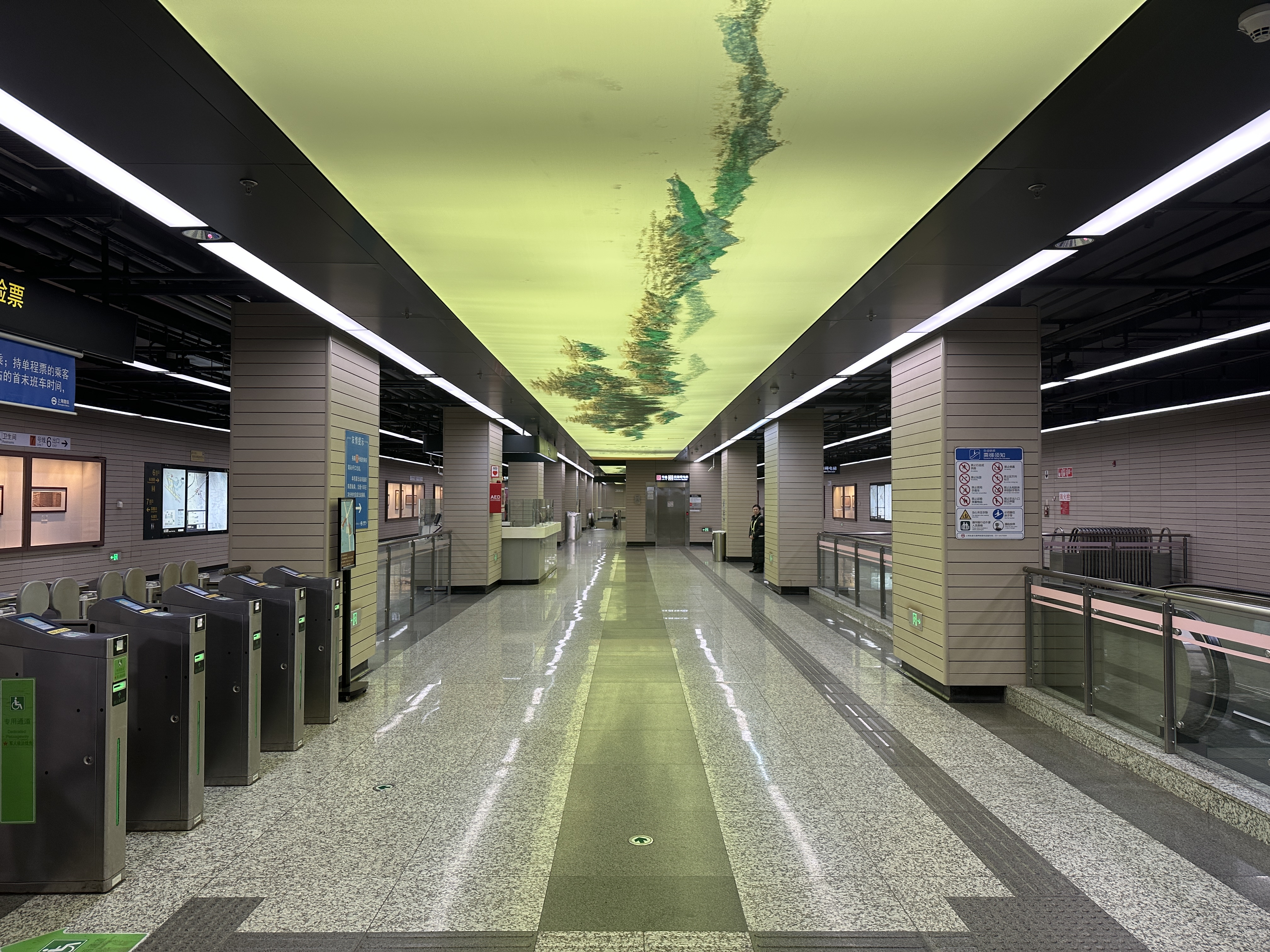
Line 13 concourse

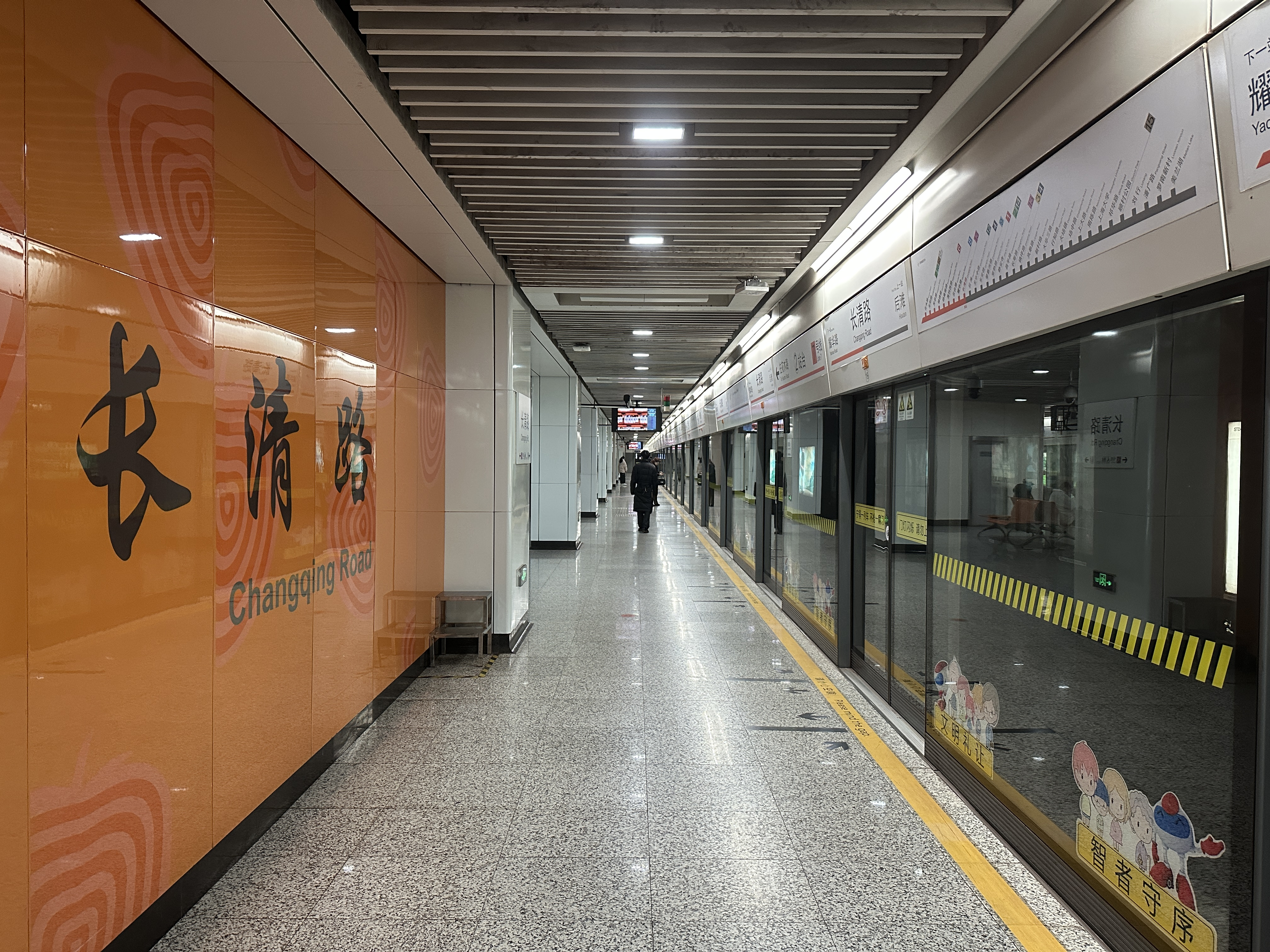
Line 7 platform

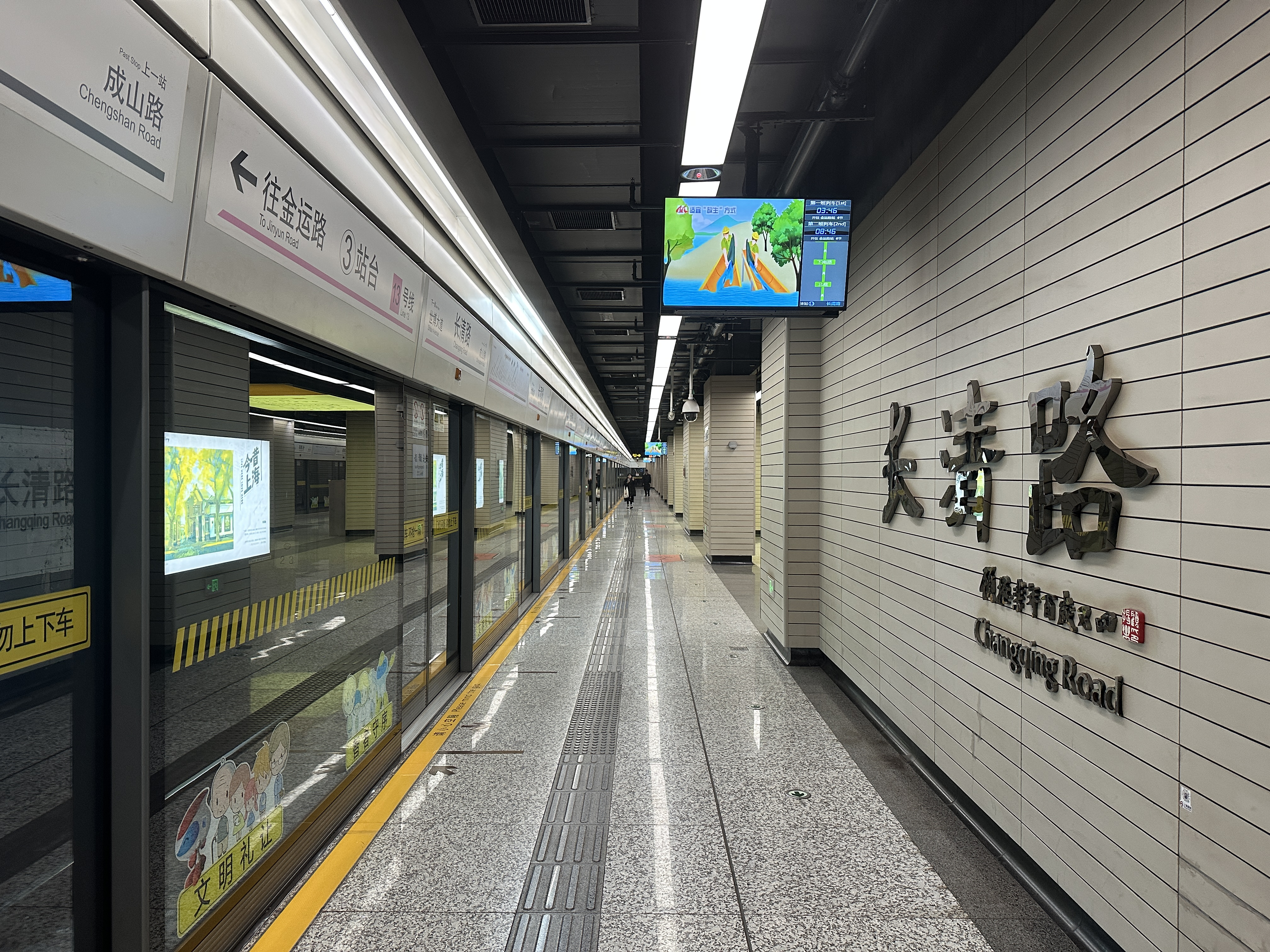
Line 13 platform
