= Yaohua Road station =

Shanghai Metro interchange station

Yaohua Road 耀华路
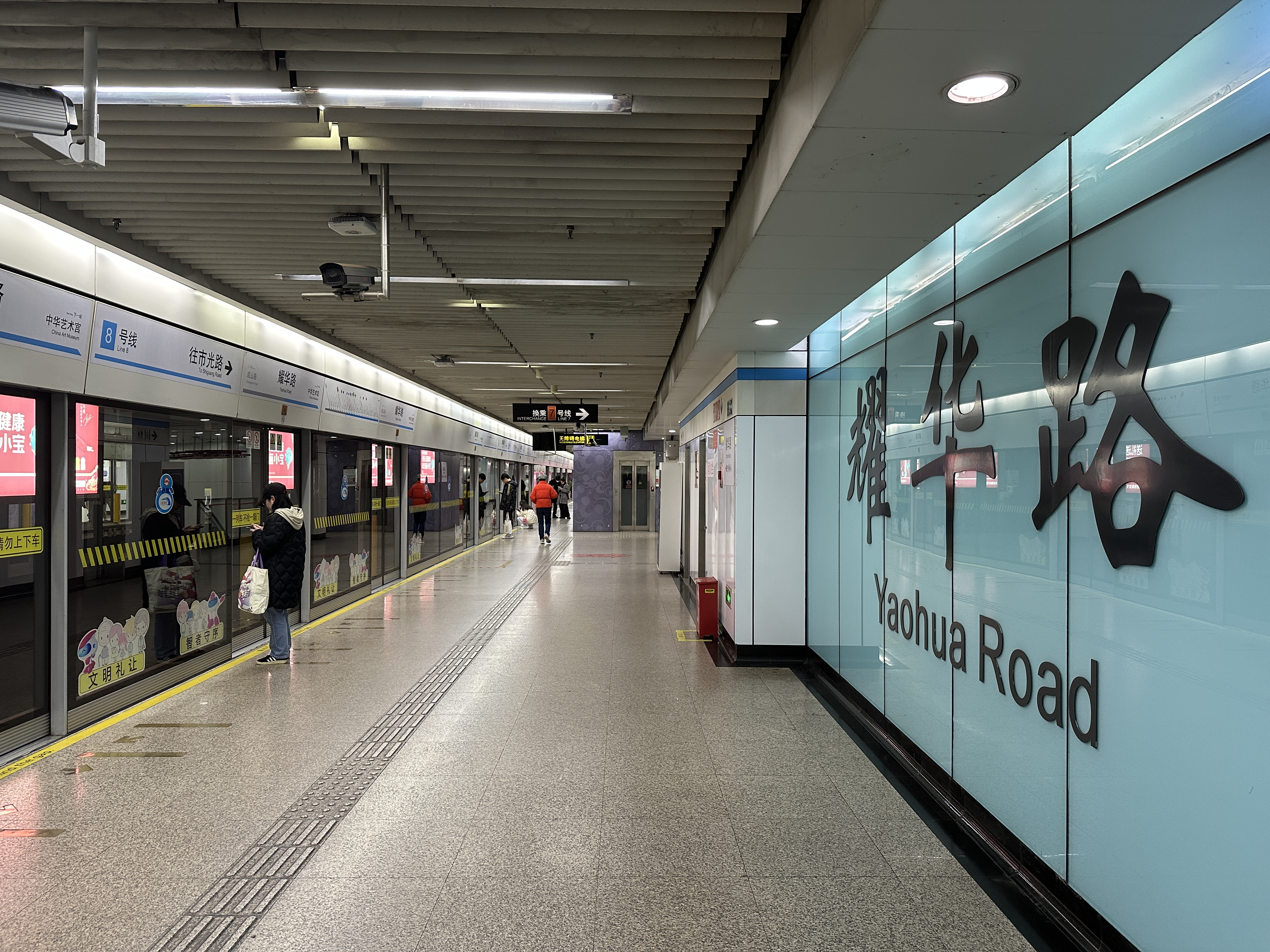
- Line 8 platform

General information
- Location: Shangnan Road and Yaohua Road (耀华路), Pudong, Shanghai; China
- Coordinates: 31.1803°N 121.489°E
- Operated by: Shanghai No. 3/4 Metro Operation Co. Ltd.
- Lines: Line 7; Line 8
- Platforms: 4 (1 island platform for Line 7 and 2 side platforms for Line 8)
- Tracks: 4

Construction
- Structure type: Underground
- Accessible: Yes

History
- Opened: 29 December 2007 (Line 8); 5 December 2009 (Line 7)

Services
Preceding station	Shanghai Metro	Following station
Changqing Road towards Meilan Lake	Line 7	Yuntai Road towards Huamu Road
China Art Museum towards Shiguang Road	Line 8	Chengshan Road towards Shendu Highway
Location

Yaohua Road (Chinese: 耀华路; pinyin: Yàohuá Lù) is an interchange station between Line 7 and Line 8 of the Shanghai Metro. It is located in the Shanghai Expo 2010 zone.

The station was closed temporarily between 22 January and 31 January 2008, for the construction of the South Xizang Road tunnel, which runs parallel underneath the subway line. On 24 October 2010 the station handled 311,000 entries and exits.

The station served as the southern terminus of Line 8 from 29 December 2007 until 5 July 2009, when the line's southern extension to the current terminus at Shendu Highway opened.

== Station Layout ==
G	Entrances and Exits	Exits 1-4
B1	Concourse	Faregates, Station Agent
B2	Side platform, doors open on the right
B2	Northbound	← Line 8 towards Shiguang Road (China Art Museum)
B2	Southbound	Line 8 towards Shendu Highway (Chengshan Road) →
B2	Side platform, doors open on the right
B3	Northbound	← Line 7 towards Meilan Lake (Changqing Road)
B3	Island platform, doors open on the left
B3	Southbound	Line 7 towards Huamu Road (Yuntai Road) →
