= Gucun Park station =

Metro station in Shanghai, China

Gucun Park 顾村公园
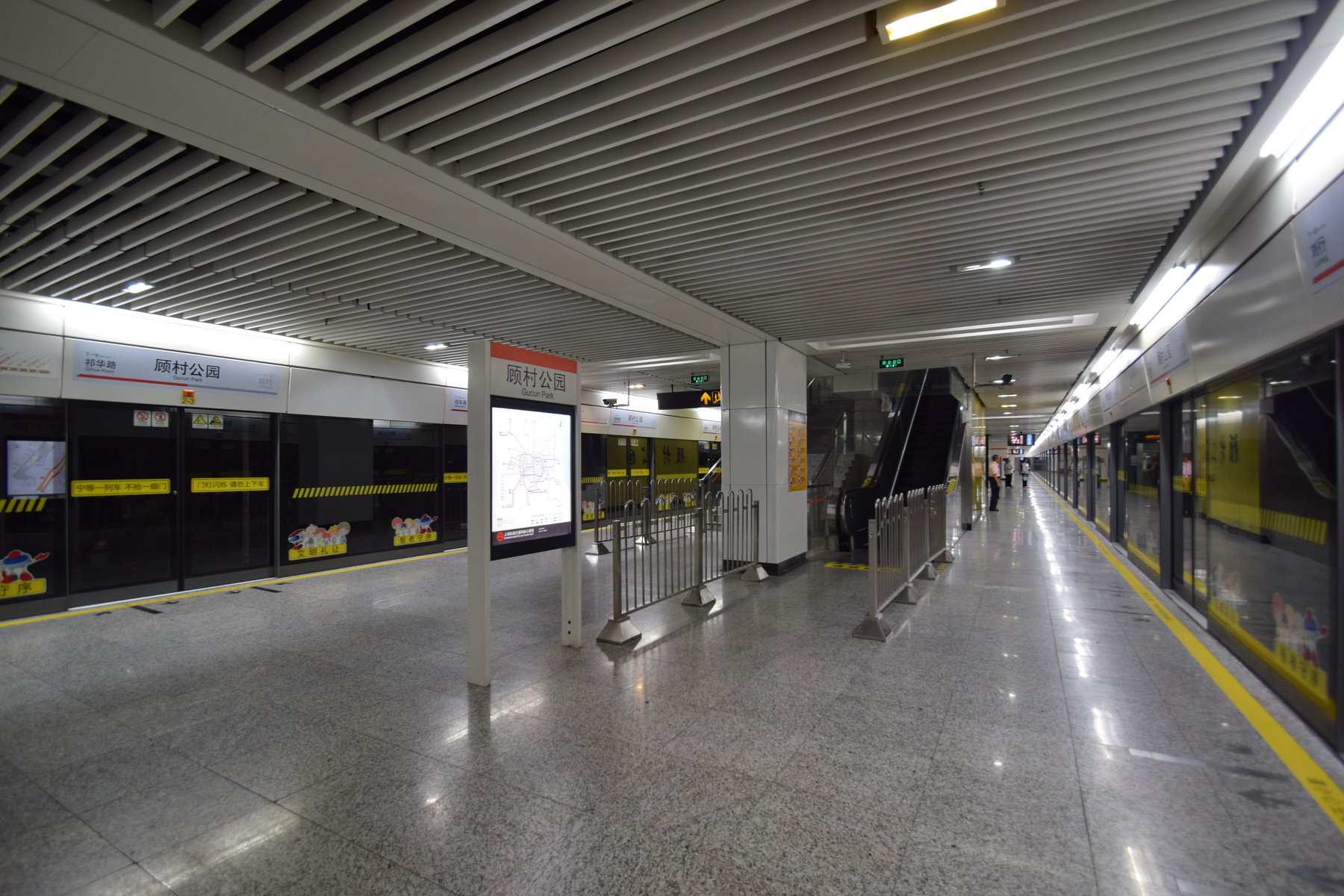
- Line 7 Platform

General information
- Location: Jingpohu Road near Qilianshan Road; Baoshan District, Shanghai; China
- Coordinates: 31.346389°N 121.368056°E
- Operator: Shanghai No. 3 Metro Operation Co. Ltd.
- Lines: Line 7 Line 15
- Platforms: 4 (2 island platforms)
- Tracks: 4

Construction
- Structure type: Underground
- Accessible: Yes

History
- Opened: 28 December 2010 (Line 7); 23 January 2021 (Line 15)
- Former names: Gucun

Services
Preceding station	Shanghai Metro	Following station
Liuhang towards Meilan Lake	Line 7	Qihua Road towards Huamu Road
Terminus	Line 15	Jinqiu Road towards Zizhu Hi-tech Park
Location

Gucun Park (simplified Chinese: 顾村公园; traditional Chinese: 顧村公園), formerly Gucun, is an interchange station between Line 7 and Line 15 on Shanghai Metro. It began operation on 28 December 2010. It became an interchange station with Line 15 when it opened on 23 January 2021, and serves as the northern terminus of Line 15.

The station is located in Gucun town, in Shanghai's Baoshan District.

== Station layout ==
G	Entrances and exits	Exits 1-6
B1	Concourse	Fare gates, station agent
B2	Northbound	← Line 7 towards Meilan Lake (Liuhang)
B2	Island platform, doors open on the left
B2	Southbound	Line 7 towards Huamu Road (Qihua Road) →
B2	Northbound	← Line 15 termination track
B2	Island platform, doors open on the left
B2	Southbound	Line 15 towards Zizhu Hi-tech Park (Jinqiu Road) →

== Gallery ==
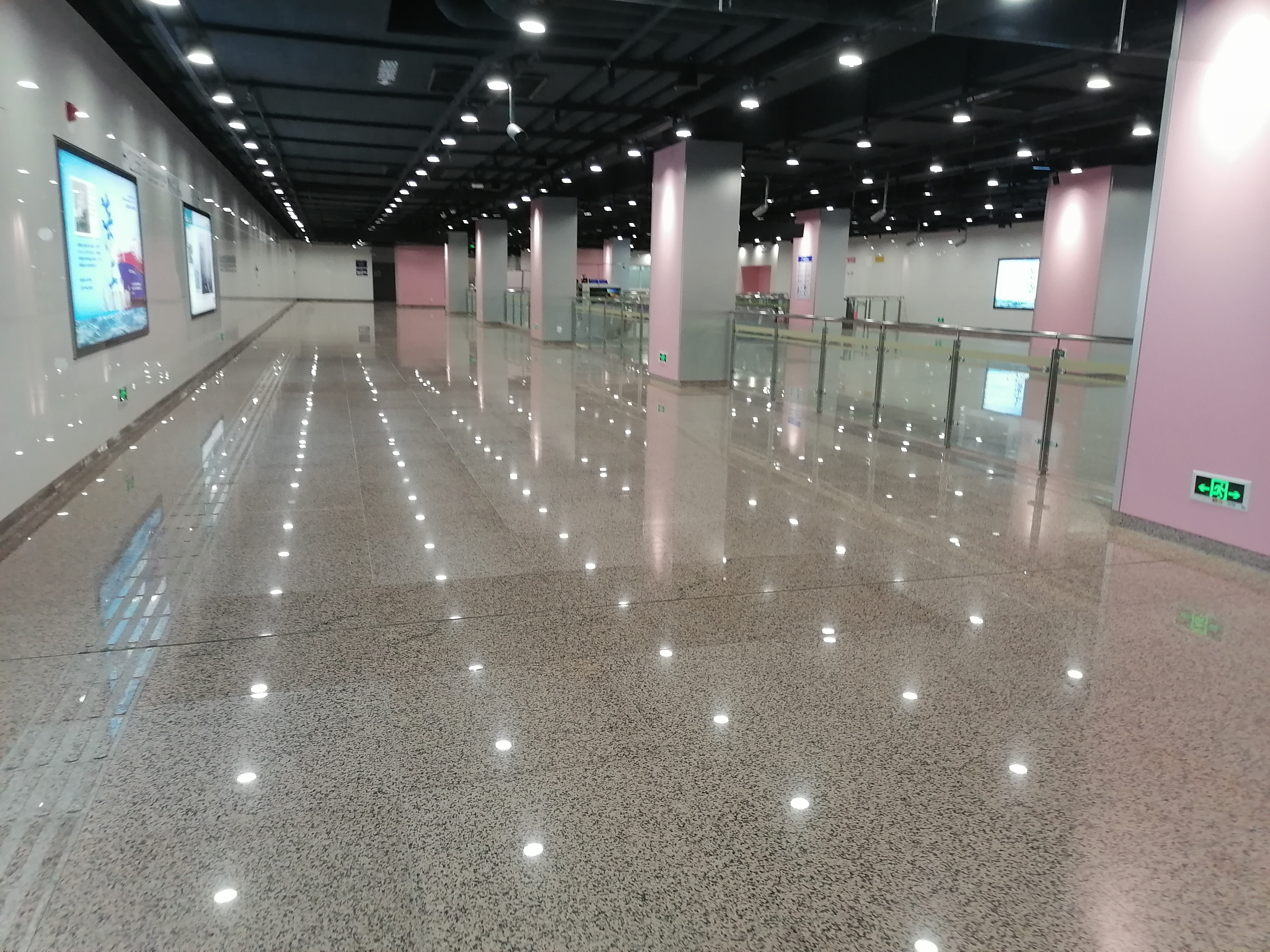
Line 15 Concourse

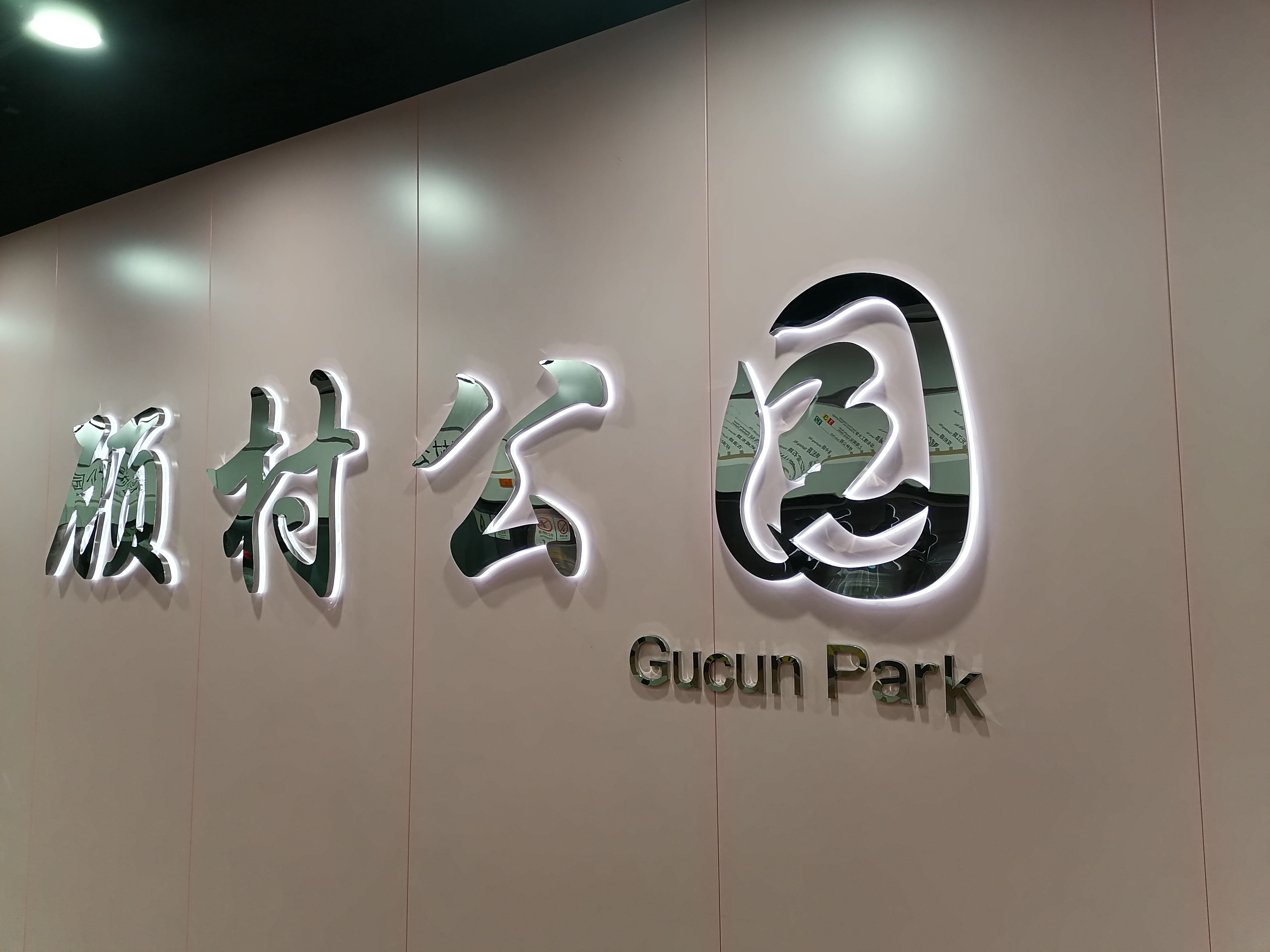
Line 15 Platform Sign

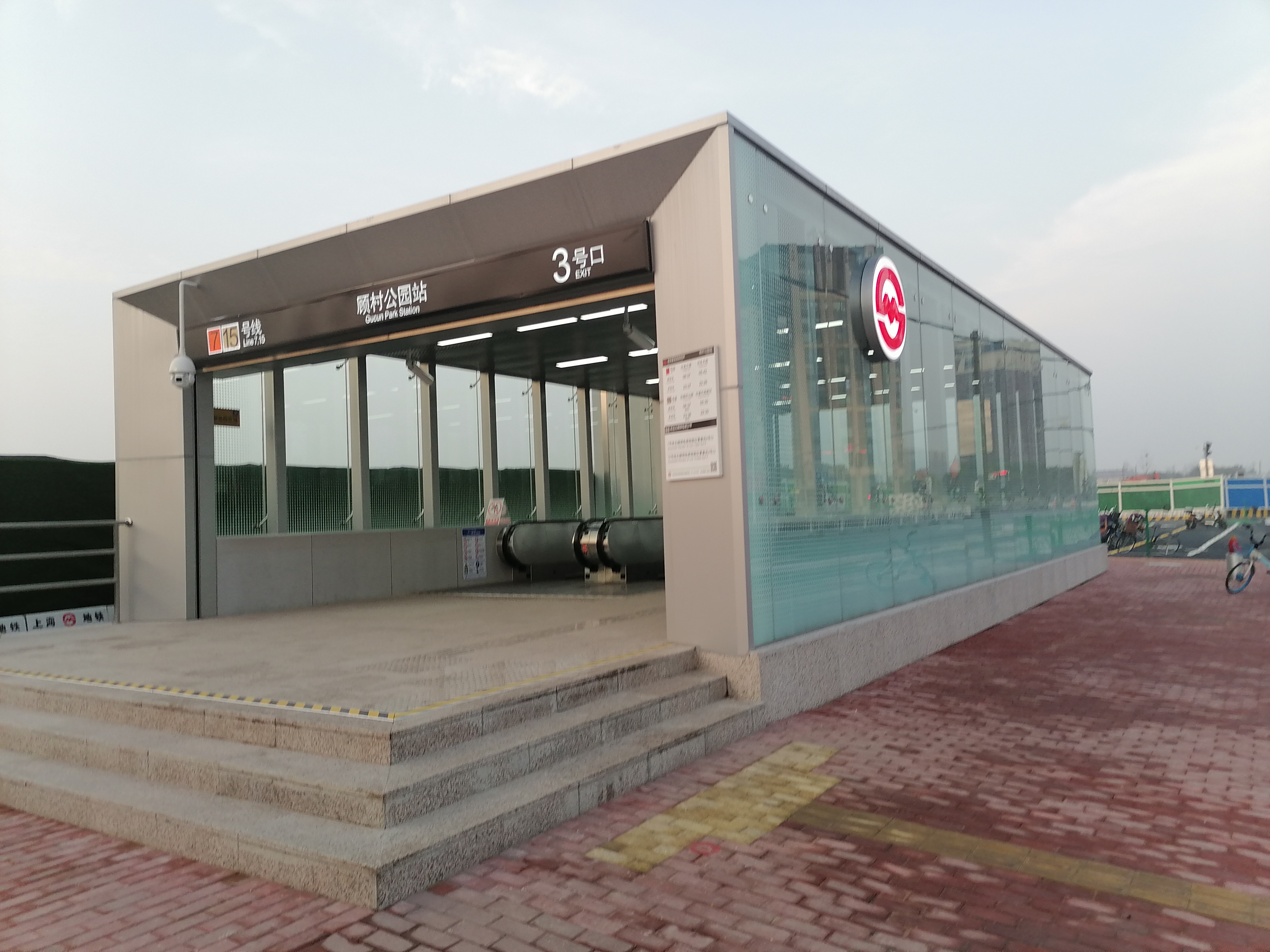
Exit 3
