= Jinxiu Road station =

Shanghai Metro station

Jinxiu Road 锦绣路
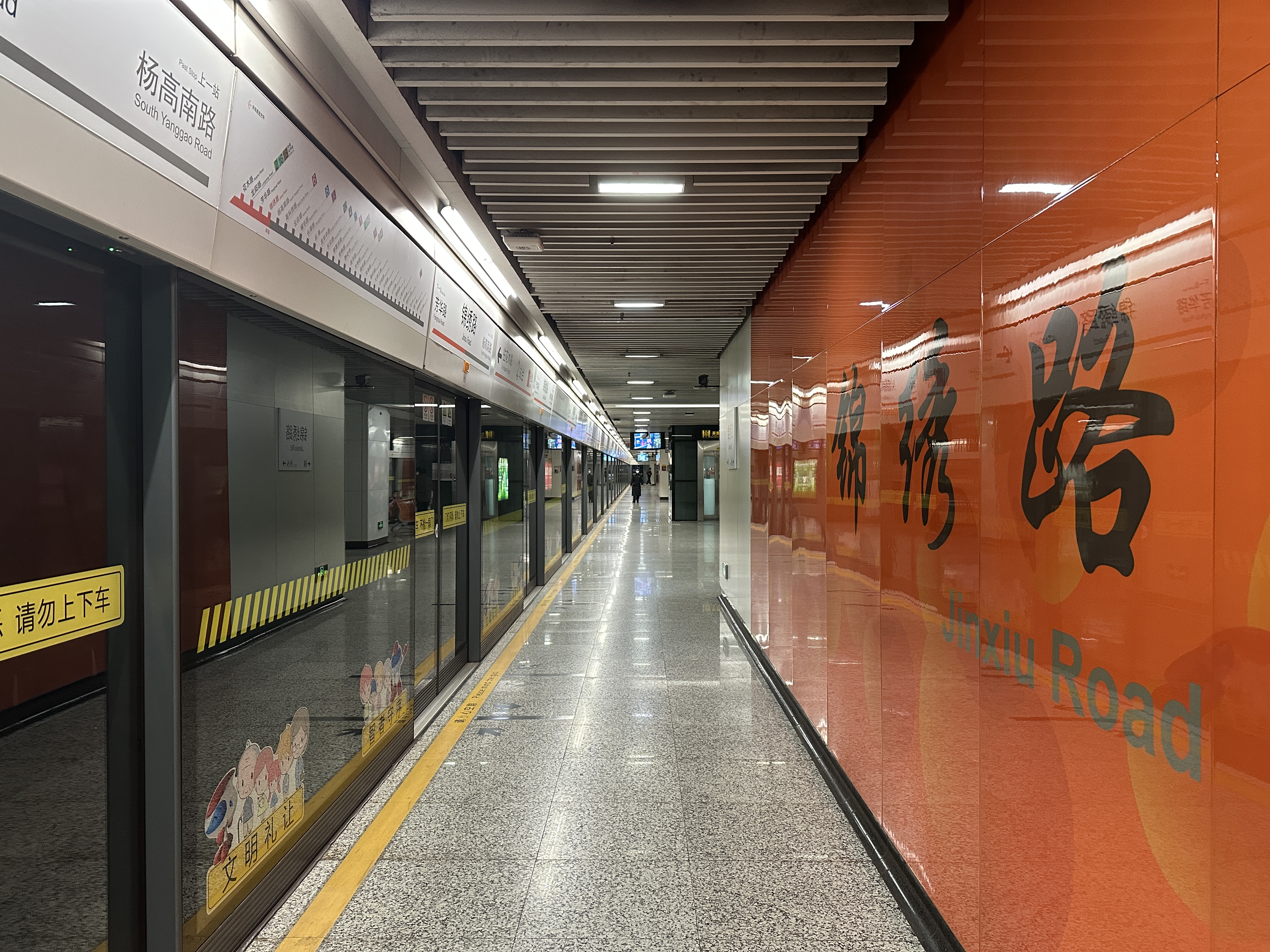
- Station platform

General information
- Location: West Gaoke Road (高科西路) and Jinxiu Road, Pudong New Area, Shanghai; China
- Coordinates: 31.1897°N 121.5347°E
- Operated by: Shanghai No. 3 Metro Operation Co. Ltd.
- Line: Line 7
- Platforms: 2 (1 island platform)
- Tracks: 2

Construction
- Structure type: Underground
- Accessible: Yes

History
- Opened: December 5, 2009

Services
Preceding station	Shanghai Metro	Following station
South Yanggao Road towards Meilan Lake	Line 7	Fanghua Road towards Huamu Road
Location

Jinxiu Road (simplified Chinese: 锦绣路; traditional Chinese: 錦繡路; pinyin: Jǐnxiù Lù) is a station on Line 7 of the Shanghai Metro. The station opened on 5 December 2009. The station is located in Shanghai's Pudong District.
