= Yanggao Road station =

Yanggao Road station may refer to the following metro stations located in Shanghai, all part of the Shanghai Metro:

- North Yanggao Road station, on Line 12
- Middle Yanggao Road station, on Line 9 and Line 18
- South Yanggao Road station, on Line 7
