= Xingzhi Road station =

Shanghai Metro station

Xingzhi Road 行知路
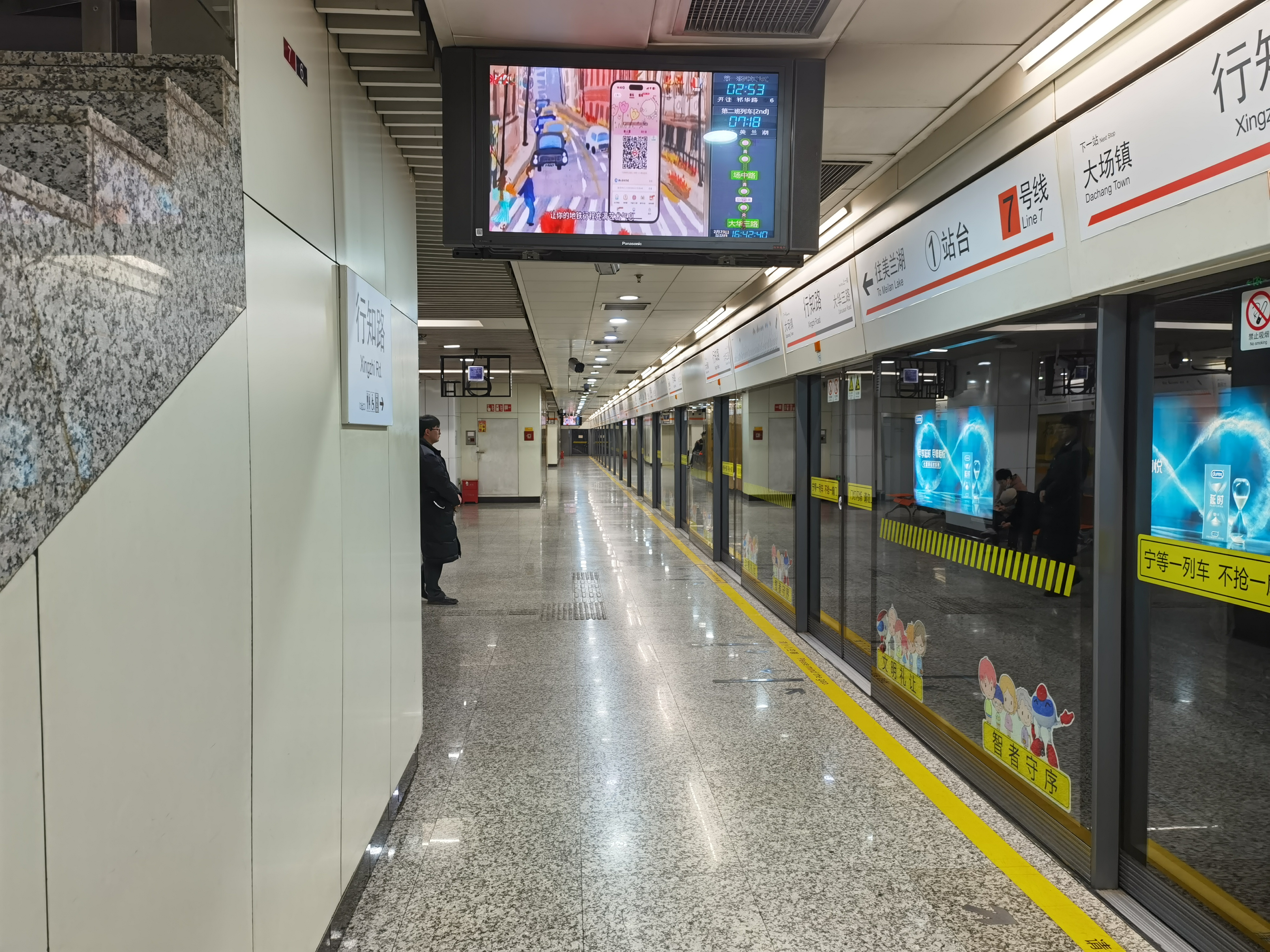
- Station platform

General information
- Location: Hutai Road (沪太路) and Xingzhi Road (行知路); Baoshan District, Shanghai; China
- Coordinates: 31°17′10″N 121°25′00″E
- Line: Line 7
- Platforms: 2 (1 island platform)
- Tracks: 2

Construction
- Structure type: Underground
- Accessible: Yes

History
- Opened: 5 December 2009

Services
Preceding station	Shanghai Metro	Following station
Dachang Town towards Meilan Lake	Line 7	Dahuasan Road towards Huamu Road
Location

Xingzhi Road (Chinese: 行知路; pinyin: Xíngzhī Lù) is a station on Line 7 of the Shanghai Metro, located in Baoshan District. It opened in 2009.
