= Middle Longhua Road station =

Shanghai Metro interchange station

Middle Longhua Road 龙华中路
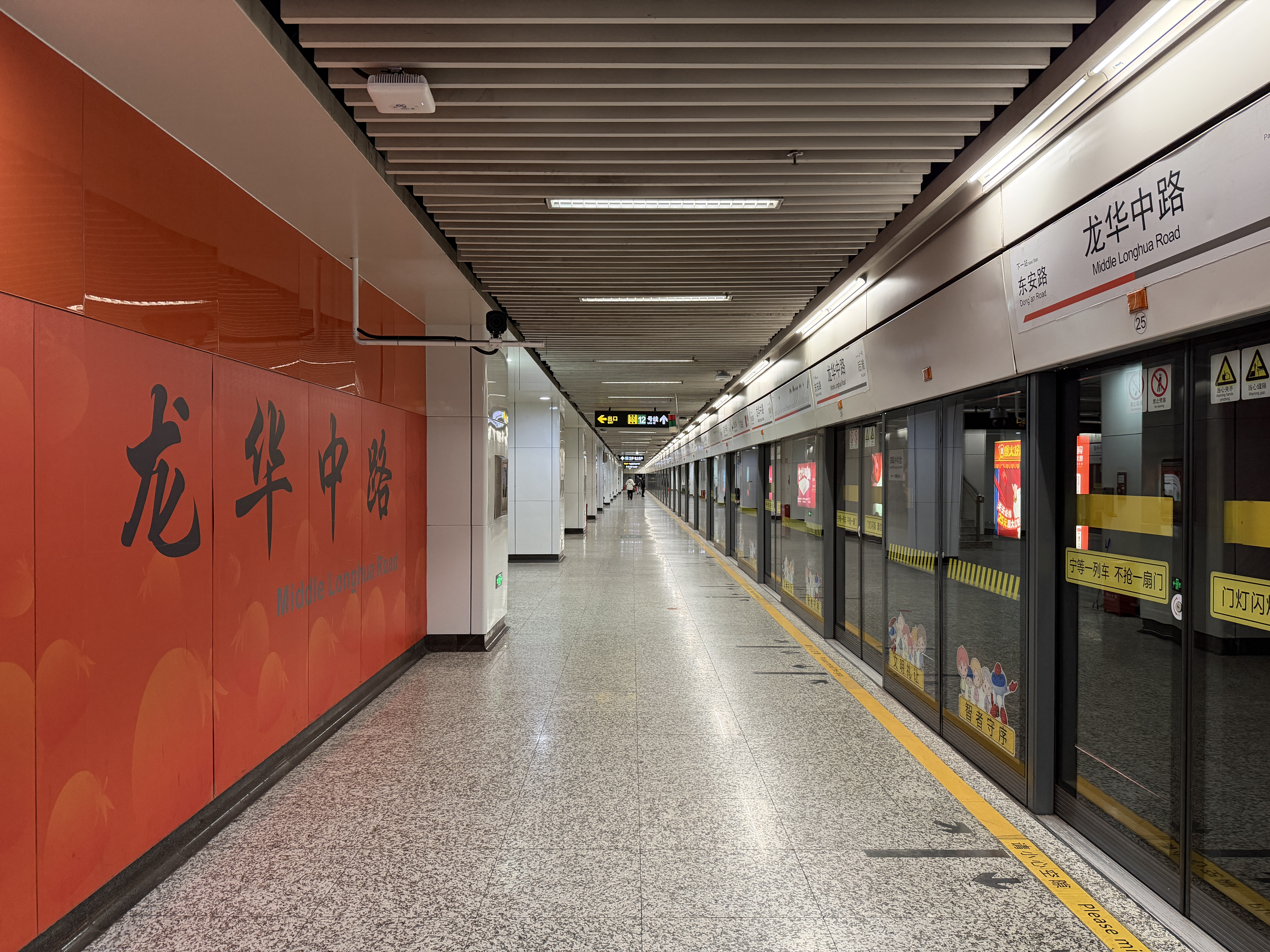

General information
- Location: Longhua Road (龙华路) and Dong'an Road; Longhua Subdistrict, Xuhui District, Shanghai; China
- Coordinates: 31.185°N 121.453°E
- Operated by: Shanghai No. 3/4 Metro Operation Co. Ltd.
- Lines: Line 7; Line 12
- Platforms: 4 (1 island platform for Line 7 and 2 side platforms for Line 12)
- Tracks: 4

Construction
- Structure type: Underground
- Accessible: Yes

History
- Opened: 5 December 2009 (Line 7); 19 December 2015 (Line 12)
- Previous names: Chuanchang Road (up to 6 June 2012)

Services
Preceding station	Shanghai Metro	Following station
Dong'an Road towards Meilan Lake	Line 7	Houtan towards Huamu Road
Longhua towards Qixin Road	Line 12	Damuqiao Road towards Jinhai Road
Location

Middle Longhua Road station
- Simplified Chinese: 龙华中路
- Traditional Chinese: 龍華中路
Transcriptions
Standard Mandarin
- Hanyu Pinyin: Lónghuá Zhōng Lù

Middle Longhua Road (Chinese: 龙华中路), formerly Chuanchang Road, is an interchange station between Line 7 and Line 12 of the Shanghai Metro located in Xuhui District. During construction it was known as Pujiang Nanpu Station. It began operation on 5 December 2009 with the official name Chuanchang Road station. In December 2012, it was officially renamed Middle Longhua Road Station. Line 12 services started on 19 December 2015, at which point it became an interchange station.

== Station Layout ==
G	Entrances and Exits	Exits 1-14
B1	Line 7 Concourse	Faregates, Station Agent
B2	Line 12 Concourse	Faregates, Station Agent
B2	Northbound	← Line 7 towards Meilan Lake (Dong'an Road)
B2	Island platform, doors open on the left
B2	Southbound	Line 7 towards Huamu Road (Houtan) →
B3	Side platform, doors open on the right
B3	Westbound	← Line 12 towards Qixin Road (Longhua)
B3	Eastbound	Line 12 towards Jinhai Road (Damuqiao Road) →
B3	Side platform, doors open on the right
