= Shangda Road station =

Shanghai Metro station

Shangda Road 上大路
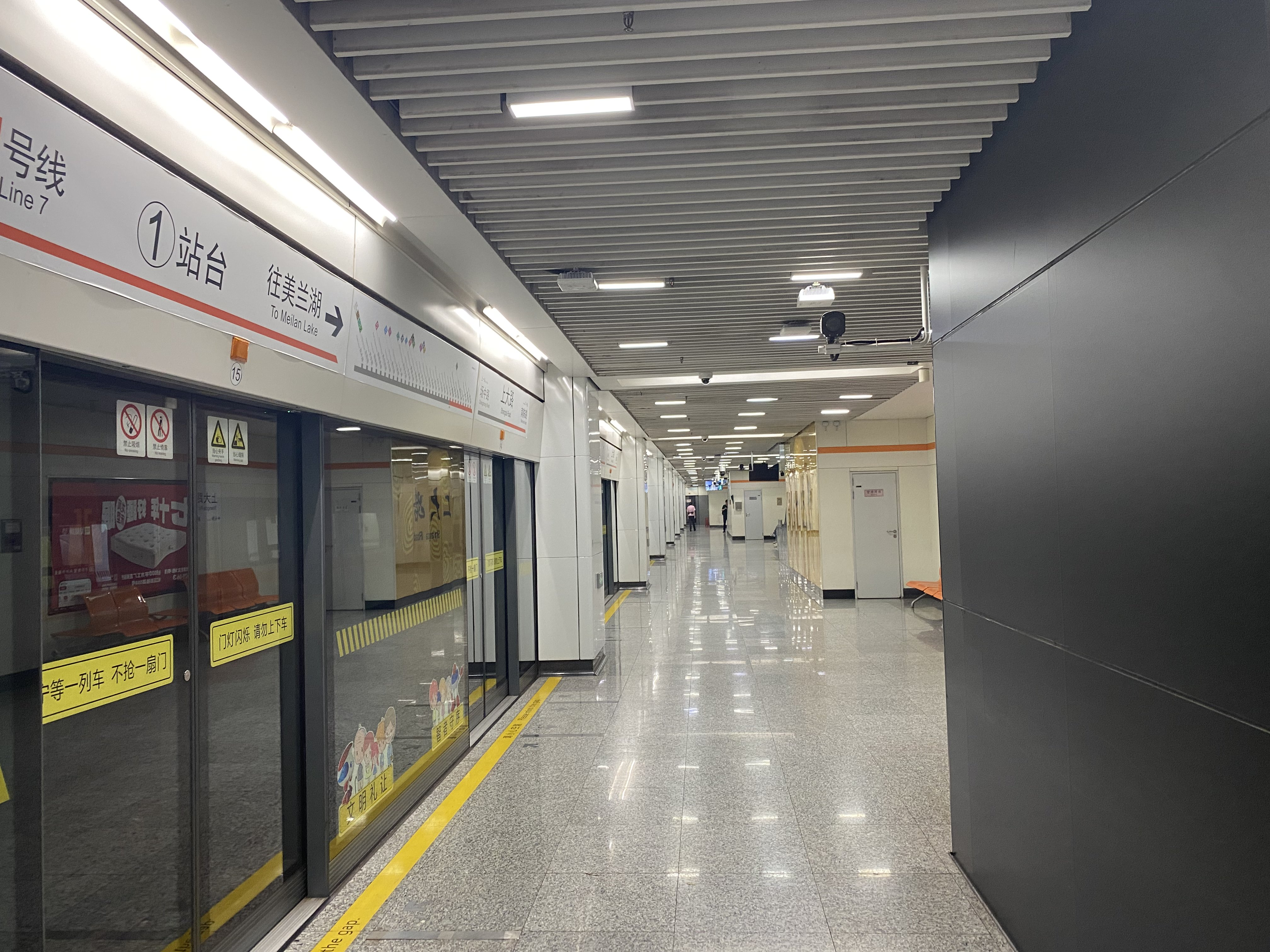
- Station platform

General information
- Location: Hutai Road (沪太路) and Shangda Road (上大路); Dachang, Baoshan District, Shanghai; China
- Coordinates: 31.3153°N 121.404°E
- Operated by: Shanghai No. 3 Metro Operation Co. Ltd.
- Line: Line 7
- Platforms: 3 (1 island platform and 1 side platform)
- Tracks: 3

Construction
- Structure type: Underground
- Accessible: Yes

History
- Opened: December 5, 2009

Services
Preceding station	Shanghai Metro	Following station
Nanchen Road towards Meilan Lake	Line 7	Changzhong Road towards Huamu Road
Location

Shangda Road (Chinese: 上大路; pinyin: Shàngdà Lù), previously named Hutai Road, is a metro station on Line 7 of the Shanghai Metro in Baoshan District, Shanghai. It began operation on December 5, 2009.

The station has 3 platforms, but only the outer island platform and the side platform are in regular service.

== Nearby ==
- Shanghai University, Baoshan Campus

== Exits ==
There are 4 exits/entrance to the station, all located on different sides of Shangda Road.
