= Dachang Town station =

Shanghai Metro station

Dachang Town 大场镇
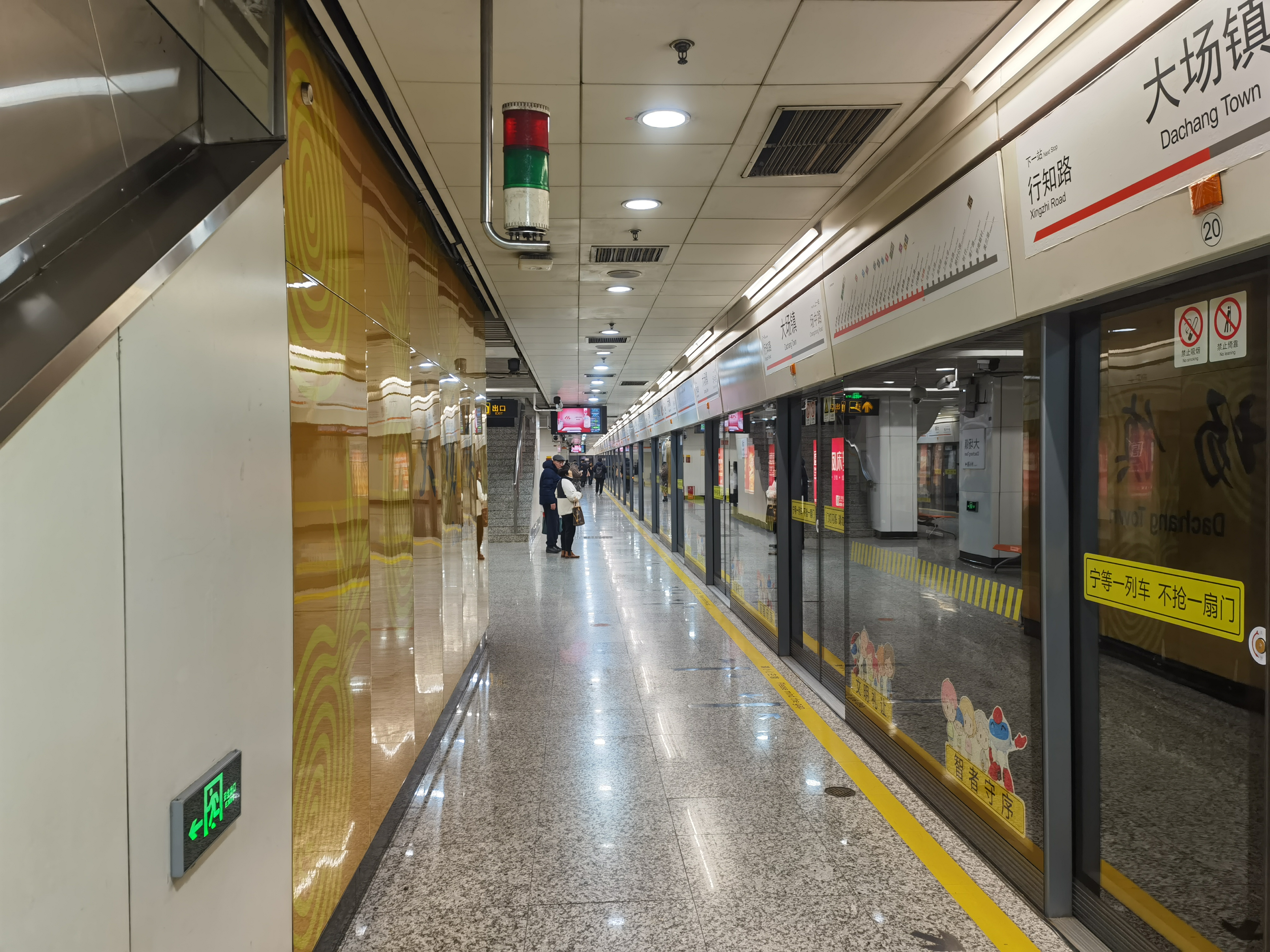
- Station platform

General information
- Location: Hutai Road (沪太路) and Wenshui Road (汶水路); Dachang, Baoshan District, Shanghai; China
- Coordinates: 31°17′42″N 121°24′41″E
- Line: Line 7
- Platforms: 2 (1 island platform)
- Tracks: 2

Construction
- Structure type: Underground
- Accessible: Yes

History
- Opened: 5 December 2009

Services
Preceding station	Shanghai Metro	Following station
Changzhong Road towards Meilan Lake	Line 7	Xingzhi Road towards Huamu Road
Location

Dachang Town (simplified Chinese: 大场镇; traditional Chinese: 大場鎮; pinyin: Dàcháng Zhèn) is a station on Line 7 of the Shanghai Metro located in Baoshan District, Shanghai, People's Republic of China. It opened in 2009.
