= Xincun Road station =

Shanghai Metro station

Xincun Road 新村路
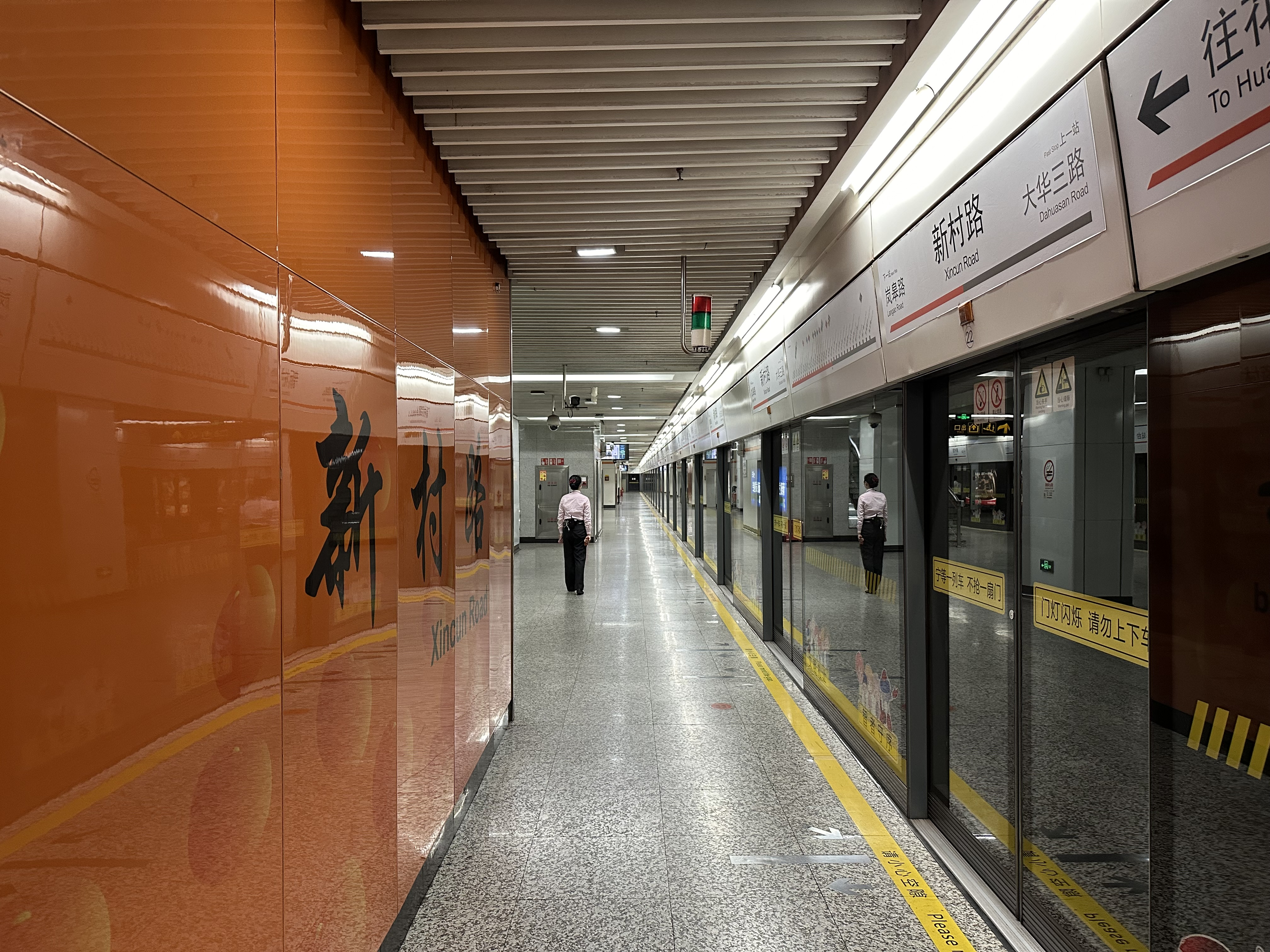
- Station platform

General information
- Location: Lingshi Road (灵石路) and Xincun Road (新村路), Putuo District, Shanghai; China
- Coordinates: 31°15′57″N 121°25′03″E
- Line: Line 7
- Platforms: 2 (1 island platform)
- Tracks: 2

Construction
- Structure type: Underground
- Accessible: Yes

History
- Opened: 5 December 2009

Services
Preceding station	Shanghai Metro	Following station
Dahuasan Road towards Meilan Lake	Line 7	Langao Road towards Huamu Road
Location

Xincun Road (Chinese: 新村路; pinyin: Xīncūn Lù) is a station on Line 7 of the Shanghai Metro, located in Putuo District. It opened in 2009.
