= South Yanggao Road station =

Shanghai Metro station

South Yanggao Road 杨高南路
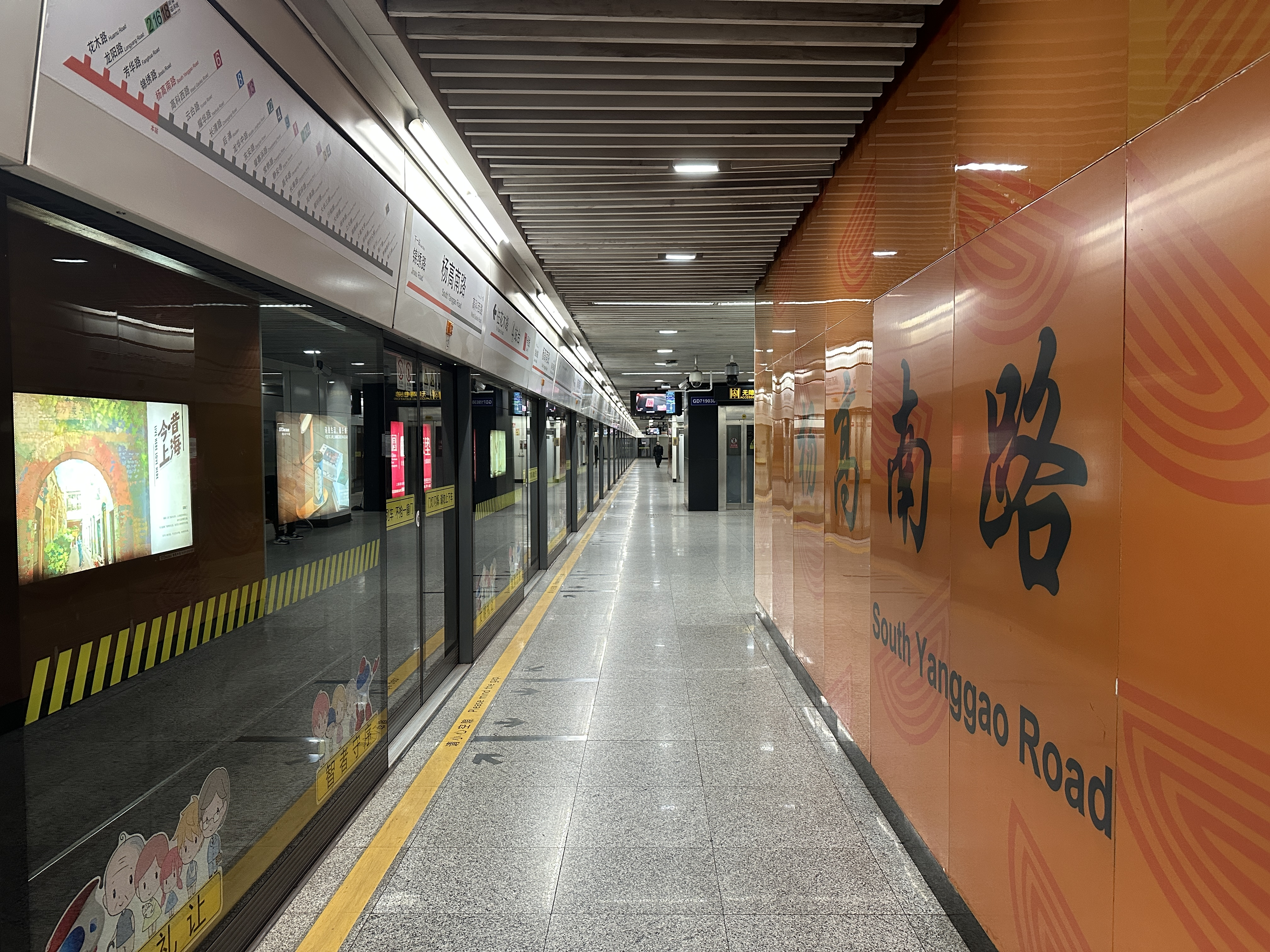
- Station platform

General information
- Location: West Gaoke Road (高科西路) and South Yanggao Road, Pudong, Shanghai; China
- Coordinates: 31°11′24″N 121°31′07″E
- Line: Line 7
- Platforms: 4 (2 island platforms)
- Tracks: 3

Construction
- Structure type: Underground
- Accessible: Yes

History
- Opened: 5 December 2009

Services
Preceding station	Shanghai Metro	Following station
West Gaoke Road towards Meilan Lake	Line 7	Jinxiu Road towards Huamu Road
Location

South Yanggao Road (simplified Chinese: 杨高南路; traditional Chinese: 楊高南路; pinyin: Yánggāo Nán Lù) is a station on Line 7 of the Shanghai Metro, located in Pudong District. It opened in 2009.

The station has 4 platforms, but only the 2 outer platforms are in regular service.
