= Shanghai University station =

Shanghai Metro station

Shanghai University 上海大学
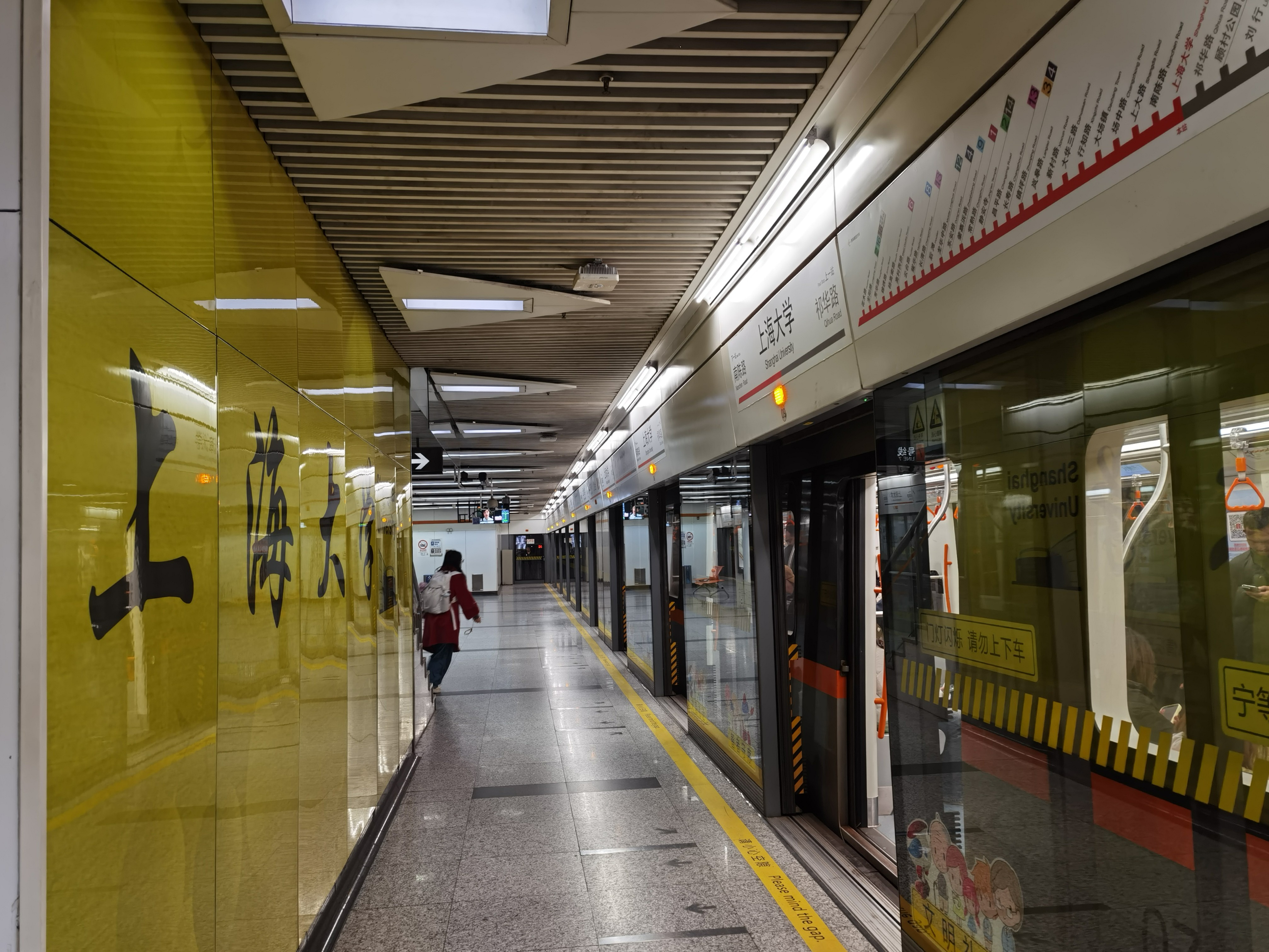
- Station platform

General information
- Location: Jinqiu Road (锦秋路) and Qilianshan Road (祁连山路); Baoshan District, Shanghai; China
- Coordinates: 31.3219°N 121.382°E
- Operator: Shanghai No. 3 Metro Operation Co. Ltd.
- Line: Line 7
- Platforms: 2 (1 island platform)
- Tracks: 2

Construction
- Structure type: Underground
- Accessible: Yes

History
- Opened: 5 December 2009

Services
Preceding station	Shanghai Metro	Following station
Qihua Road towards Meilan Lake	Line 7	Nanchen Road towards Huamu Road
Location

Shanghai University (simplified Chinese: 上海大学; traditional Chinese: 上海大學; pinyin: Shànghǎi Dàxué) is a metro station at Shanghai University in Baoshan District, Shanghai.

This station is part of Line 7^{1} and opened on December 5, 2009. It was the northern terminus of the line until the phase 2 extension to Meilan Lake, which opened on December 28, 2010.

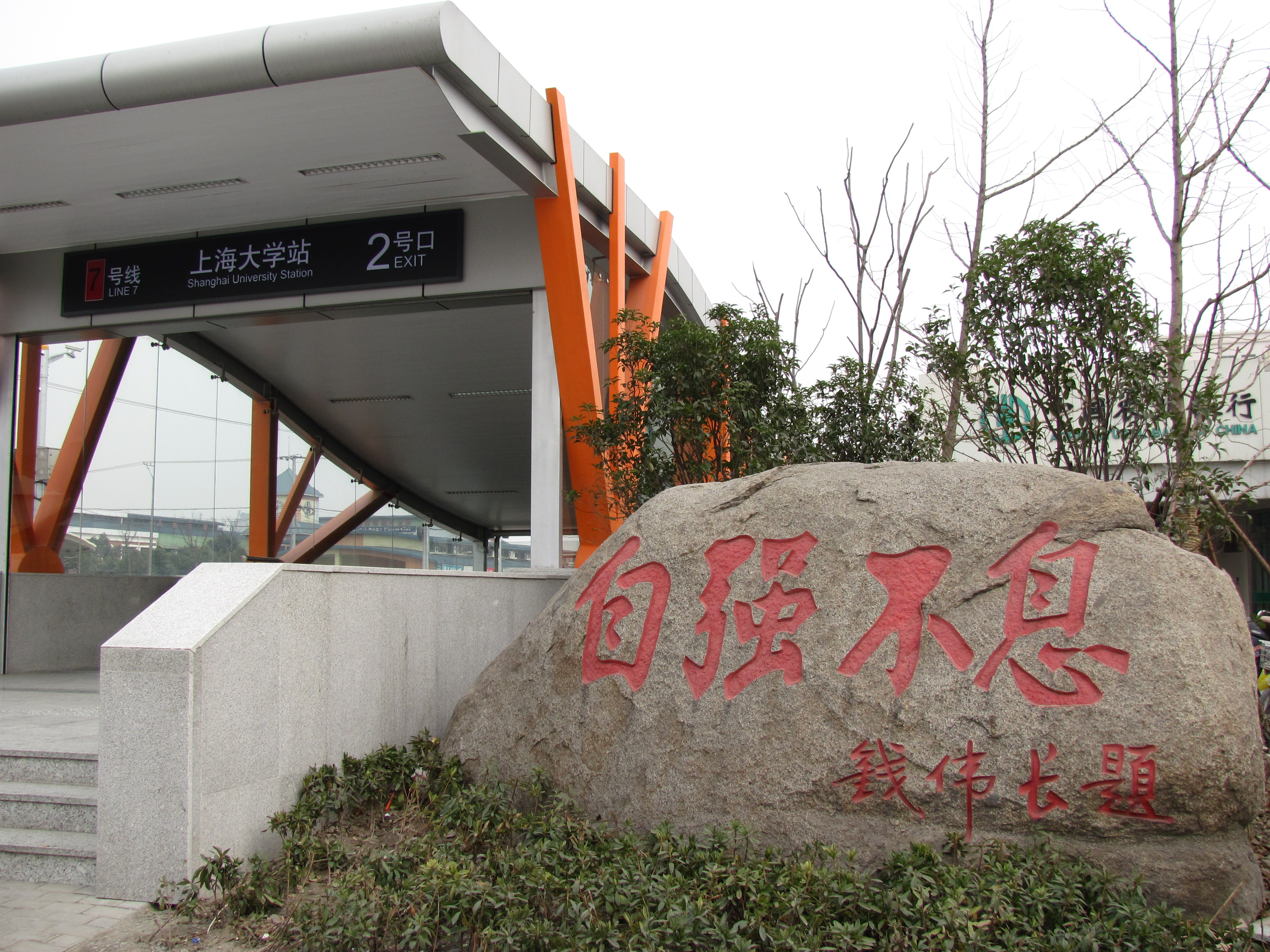
Exit number 2 of the station.

== Nearby ==
- Shanghai University, Baoshan Campus
