= Qihua Road station =

Metro station in Shanghai, China

Qihua Road 祁华路
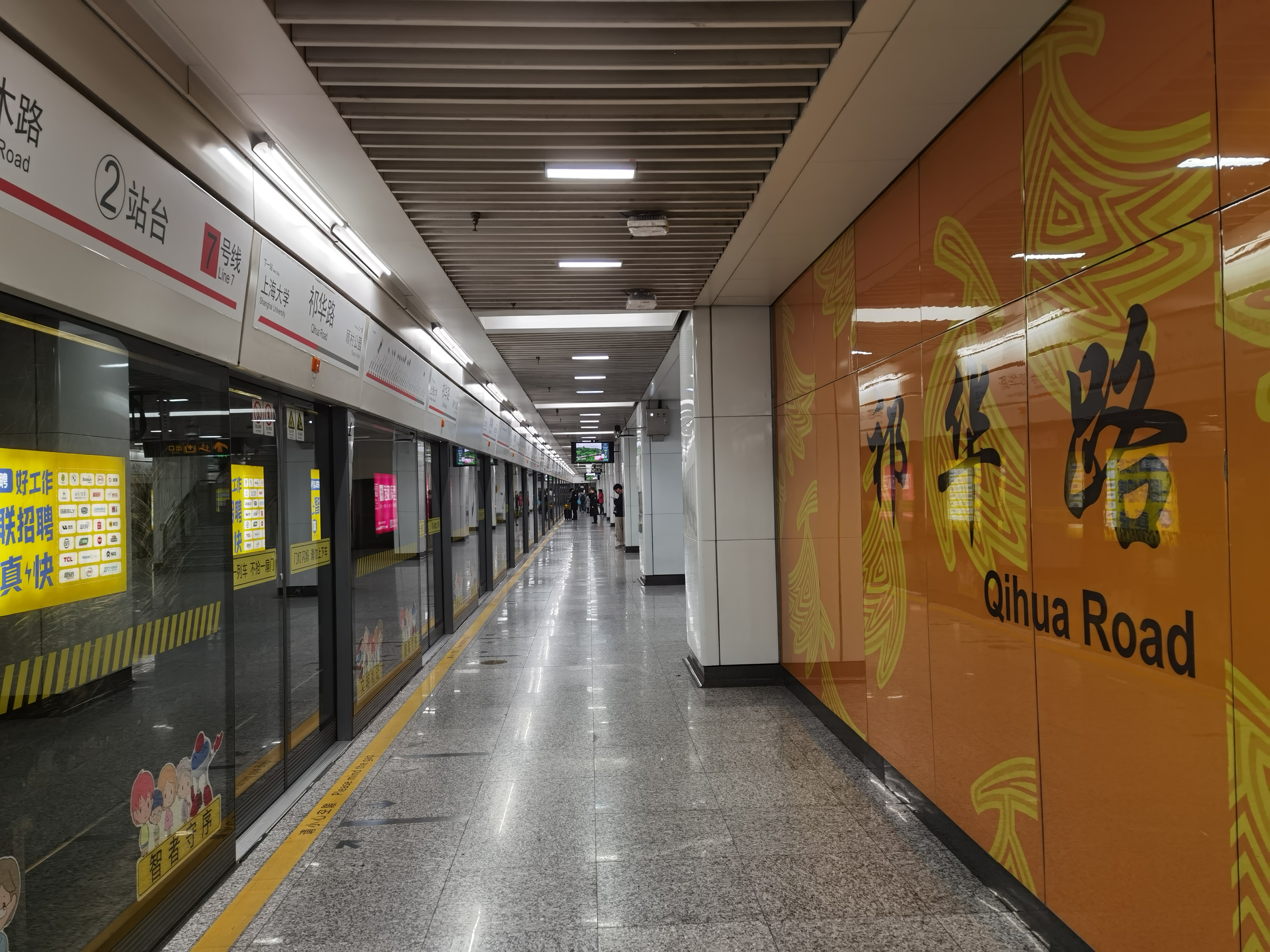
- Station platform

General information
- Location: Shanghai; China
- Coordinates: 31°19′27″N 121°22′07″E
- Operated by: Shanghai No. 3 Metro Operation Co. Ltd.
- Line: Line 7
- Platforms: 2 (1 island platform)
- Tracks: 2

Construction
- Structure type: Underground
- Accessible: Yes

History
- Opened: 22 July 2014

Services
Preceding station	Shanghai Metro	Following station
Gucun Park towards Meilan Lake	Line 7	Shanghai University towards Huamu Road
Location

Qihua Road (Chinese: 祁华路; pinyin: Qíhuá Lù) is a metro station in Baoshan District, Shanghai. It is on Line 7.

Due to station complexities, the station is the last to open on the line; it began operation on 22 July 2014, more than 4 years after the line initially opened.

== Nearby ==
- Shanghai University, Baoshan Campus
