= Line 7 (Shanghai Metro) =

Metro line of the Shanghai Metro

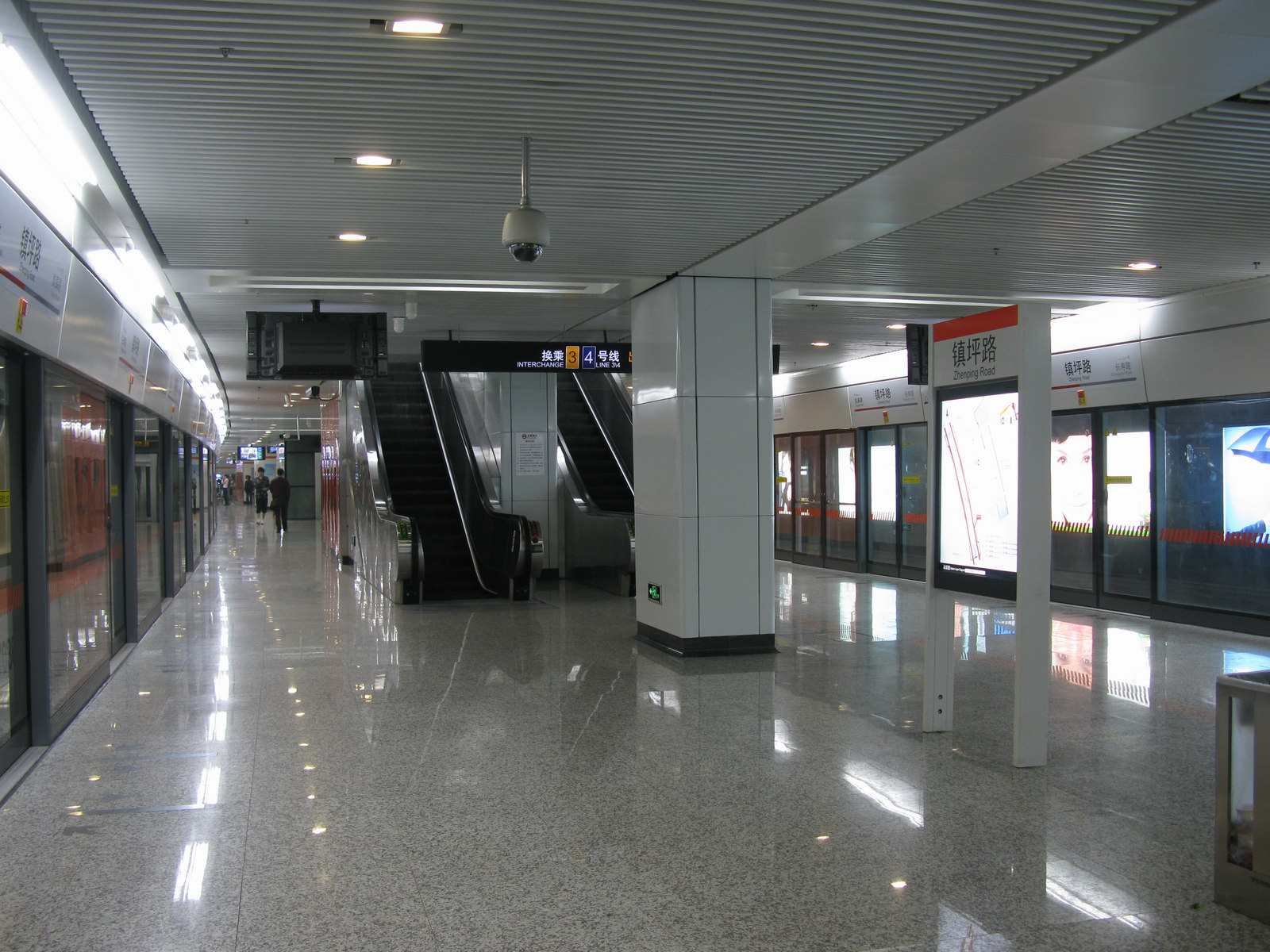
- A view of station Zhenping Road

Overview
- Other name: M7 (planned name)
- Native name: 上海地铁7号线
- Status: Operational
- Owner: Shanghai Rail Transit Line 7 Development Co., Ltd.
- Locale: Pudong; Xuhui, Jing'an, Putuo, and Baoshan districts, Shanghai, China
- Termini: Meilan Lake; Huamu Road
- Stations: 33

Service
- Type: Rapid transit
- System: Shanghai Metro
- Operator: Shanghai No. 3 Metro Operation Co. Ltd.
- Depot(s): Chentai Road Depot; Longyang Road Yard
- Rolling stock: 07A01; 07A02; 07A03
- Daily ridership: 958,000 (2019 Peak)

History
- Work began: November 24, 2005; 20 years ago
- Opened: December 5, 2009; 16 years ago
- Last extension: December 28, 2010; 15 years ago

Technical
- Line length: 44.2 km (27.5 mi)
- Number of tracks: 2
- Character: Underground; Elevated (Luonan Xincun and Meilan Lake)
- Track gauge: 1,435 mm (4 ft 8 1/2 in)
- Electrification: Overhead lines (1500 volts)
- Operating speed: 80 km/h (50 mph); Average speed: 30.3 km/h (19 mph)
- Signalling: Thales’ SelTracTM CBTC
Route map
Route on the Shanghai map:
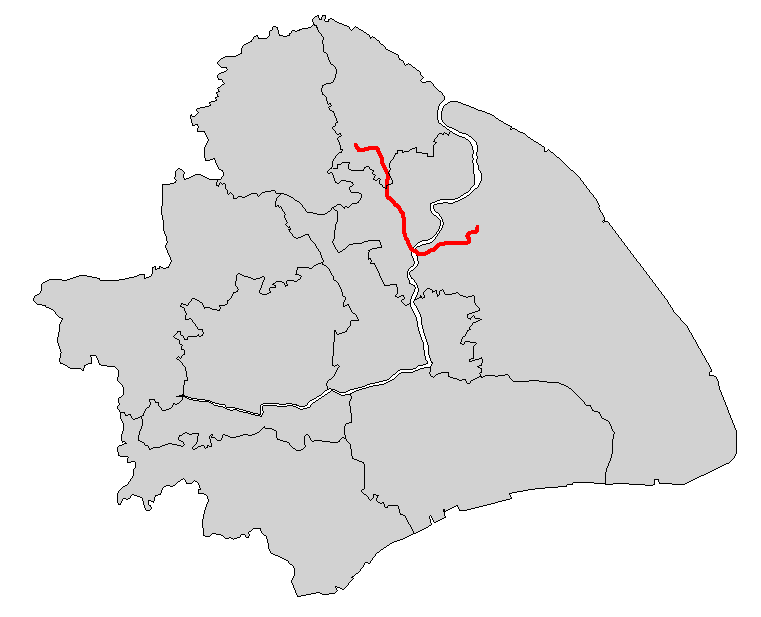
To scale geographic map:

Line 7 is a northwest–southeast line of the Shanghai Metro network. It connects the Baoshan District of Shanghai with the downtown core as well as the Pudong New Area and the Expo 2010 site. It currently runs from Meilan Lake in Baoshan District to Huamu Road in Pudong, which is near Shanghai New International Expo Center. Qihua Road serves as a terminus for trains returning to Chentai Road Depot. The line is colored orange on system maps.

== History ==
- Construction began on November 24, 2005.
- The first section of the line from Huamu Road to Shanghai University opened to the public on December 5, 2009.
  - In the first few months of operation, the trains only operated from 9AM-4PM to allow for extended testing of the line.
  - On February 20, 2010, operating hours have been extended to fall in line with the rest of the metro system afterwards.
- On April 20, 2010, Houtan station entered operation.
- In December 2010, three stations on the northern extension of the line opens.
- In June 2011, two more stations on the northern extension of the line opens.
- In July 2014, Qihua Road station entered operation.

Shanghai Metro Line 7 opening history
Segment	Commencement	Opened	Length	Station(s)	Name	Investment
Shanghai University — Huamu Road	24 Nov 2005	5 Dec 2009	34.4 km (21.38 mi)	26	Initial phase	¥18.7 billion
Houtan		20 Apr 2010	Infill station	1
Meilan Lake — Shanghai University	24 Nov 2005	28 Dec 2010	9.8 km (6.09 mi)	3	Northern extension	¥3.157 billion
Panguang Road, Liuhang		30 Jun 2011	Infill stations	2
Qihua Road		22 Jul 2014	Infill station	1

== Stations ==
=== Service routes ===
Shanghai Metro Line 7 service routes
M - Mainline: Meilan Lake ↔ Huamu Road; P - Partial Mainline: Qihua Road ↔ Huamu Road
Routes		Station name		Connections	Distance			Location	Open- ing	Plat- form
M	P	English	Chinese	Connections	km		min	Location	Open- ing	Plat- form
●		Meilan Lake	美兰湖		0.00	0.00	0	Baoshan	28 Dec 2010	Elevated Side
●		Luonan Xincun	罗南新村		1.65	1.65	4	Baoshan	28 Dec 2010	Elevated Side
●		Panguang Road	潘广路		2.98	4.63	8	Baoshan	30 June 2011	Underground Island
●		Liuhang	刘行		0.97	5.60	10	Baoshan	30 June 2011	Underground Island
●		Gucun Park	顾村公园	15	1.72	7.32	13	Baoshan	28 Dec 2010	Underground Island
●	●	Qihua Road	祁华路		2.74	10.06	17	Baoshan	22 July 2014	Underground Island
●	●	Shanghai University	上海大学		1.68	11.74	20	Baoshan	5 Dec 2009	Underground Island
●	●	Nanchen Road	南陈路		0.95	12.69	22	Baoshan	5 Dec 2009	Underground Island
●	●	Shangda Road	上大路		1.42	14.11	25	Baoshan	5 Dec 2009	Underground Island & Side
●	●	Changzhong Road	场中路		1.41	15.52	27	Baoshan	5 Dec 2009	Underground Island
●	●	Dachang Town	大场镇		1.24	16.76	30	Baoshan	5 Dec 2009	Underground Island
●	●	Xingzhi Road	行知路		1.04	17.80	32	Baoshan	5 Dec 2009	Underground Island
●	●	Dahuasan Road	大华三路		1.25	19.05	35	Baoshan	5 Dec 2009	Underground Island
●	●	Xincun Road	新村路		1.06	20.11	37	Putuo	5 Dec 2009	Underground Island
●	●	Langao Road	岚皋路		0.81	20.92	39	Putuo	5 Dec 2009	Underground Island
●	●	Zhenping Road	镇坪路	3 4	1.53	22.45	42	Putuo	5 Dec 2009	Underground Island
●	●	Changshou Road	长寿路	13	1.03	23.48	45	Putuo	5 Dec 2009	Underground Island
●	●	Changping Road	昌平路		0.75	24.23	47	Jing'an	5 Dec 2009	Underground Side
●	●	Jing'an Temple	静安寺	2 14 Yan'an BRT	1.38	25.61	50	Jing'an	5 Dec 2009	Underground Island
●	●	Changshu Road	常熟路	1	1.09	26.7	52	Xuhui	5 Dec 2009	Underground Island
●	●	Zhaojiabang Road	肇嘉浜路	9	1.66	28.36	55	Xuhui	5 Dec 2009	Underground Island
●	●	Dong'an Road	东安路	4	0.96	29.32	57	Xuhui	5 Dec 2009	Underground Island
●	●	Middle Longhua Road	龙华中路	12	0.75	30.07	59	Xuhui	5 Dec 2009	Underground Island
●	●	Houtan	后滩		2.21	32.28	63	Pudong	20 April 2010	Underground Island
●	●	Changqing Road	长清路	13 (Note: Virtual transfer with line 13 – passengers who hold the Shanghai Public Transportation Card and transfer within 30 minutes of exiting the station are able to transfer to other lines without exiting the system.)	1.28	33.56	65	Pudong	5 Dec 2009	Underground Island
●	●	Yaohua Road	耀华路	8	0.94	34.50	67	Pudong	5 Dec 2009	Underground Island
●	●	Yuntai Road	云台路		0.73	35.23	69	Pudong	5 Dec 2009	Underground Island
●	●	West Gaoke Road	高科西路	6	0.97	36.20	72	Pudong	5 Dec 2009	Underground Island
●	●	South Yanggao Road	杨高南路		1.48	37.68	74	Pudong	5 Dec 2009	Underground Double Island
●	●	Jinxiu Road	锦绣路		1.44	39.12	77	Pudong	5 Dec 2009	Underground Island
●	●	Fanghua Road	芳华路		1.45	40.57	80	Pudong	5 Dec 2009	Underground Island
●	●	Longyang Road	龙阳路	2 16 18 Maglev (Note: Out of system transfer with Shanghai Maglev Train.)	1.69	42.26	83	Pudong	5 Dec 2009	Underground Island
●	●	Huamu Road	花木路		1.14	43.40	86	Pudong	5 Dec 2009	Underground Island

=== Important stations ===
- Shanghai University station, which serves the Shanghai University.
- Zhenping Road station is a station where line 7 crosses lines 3 and 4.
- Jing'an Temple station, located under the busy Nanjing Road, is an interchange with line 2.

=== Future expansions ===
There are no current extensions planned.

=== Station name change ===
- On June 6, 2012, Chuanchang Road was renamed Middle Longhua Road.

== Headways ==
Shanghai Metro Line 7 headway
Time		Meilan Lake - Qihua Road	Qihua Road - South Yanggao Road	South Yanggao Road - Huamu Road
Monday - Friday (Working Days)
AM peak	7:30–9:00	About 3 min and 30 sec	Southbound: (Note: Southbound to South Yanggao Road.) Average 1 min and 55 sec Northbound: (Note: Northbound to Qihua Road.) Average 3 min	Southbound: (Note: Southbound to Huamu Road.) Average 4 min Northbound: (Note: Northbound to South Yanggao Road.) Average 3 – 6 min
Off-peak	9:00–17:30	About 11 min	About 5 min and 30 sec
PM peak	17:30–20:30	Southbound: (Note: Southbound to Qihua Road.) Average 6 min and 55 sec	Southbound: Average 4 min and 40 sec
PM peak	17:30–20:30	Northbound: (Note: Northbound to Meilan Lake.) Average 3 min and 30 sec	Northbound: About 2 min and 44 sec	Northbound: Average 5 min and 30 sec
Other hours	Before 7:30 After 19:00	10 – 11 min	5 – 8 min
Saturday and Sunday (Weekends)
Peak	8:00–20:00	About 10 min	About 5 min
Other hours	Before 8:00 After 20:00	10 – 11 min	5 – 8 min
Extended operation (Friday and Saturday)
	After 22:30		Average 20 min

=== Rolling stock ===
Shanghai Metro Line 7 rolling stock
Fleet numbers	Manufacturer	Time of manufac- turing	Class	No of car	Assembly (Note: Tc: Trailer with cab; Mp: EMU with pantograph; M: EMU without pantograph.)	Rolling stock	Number	Notes
252	Bombardier	2008–2010	A (Note: Class A carriage: 21-24m in length, 3.0m in width and 3.8m in height; Capacity: about 310 people.)	6	Tc+Mp+M+M+Mp+Tc	07A01	0701-0742 (070011-072521)	Original name: AC10. Same as 09A02 and 12A01 (but different painting).
180	CRRC Changchun Railway Vehicles Co., Ltd.	2016-2018	A	6	Tc+Mp+M+M+Mp+Tc	07A02	0743-0772 (072531-074321)	Same as 09A03 (but different painting).
42	CRRC Changchun Railway Vehicles Co., Ltd.	2019-2020	A	6	Tc+Mp+M+M+Mp+Tc	07A03	07073-07079 (074331-074741)

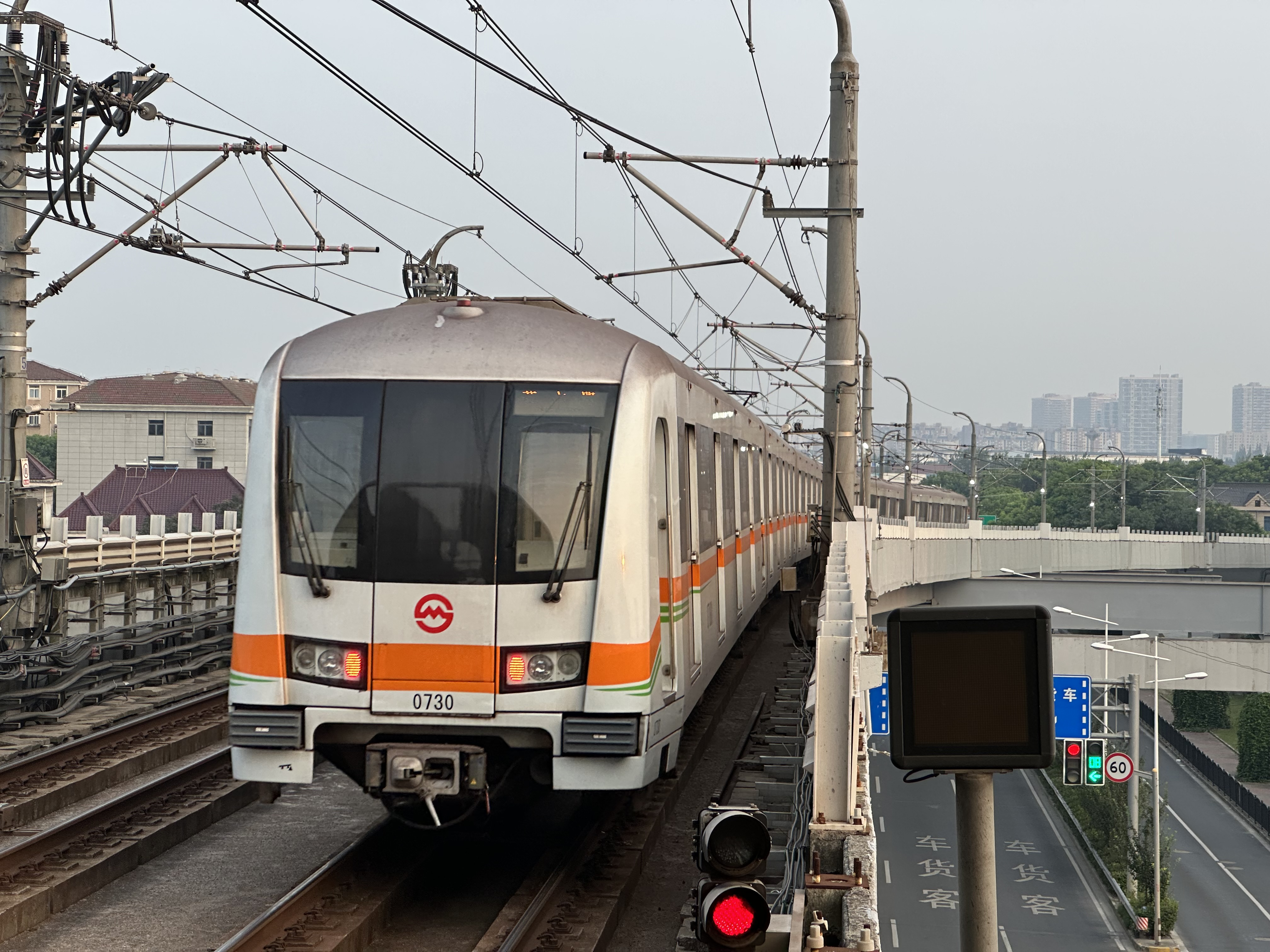
07A01 train

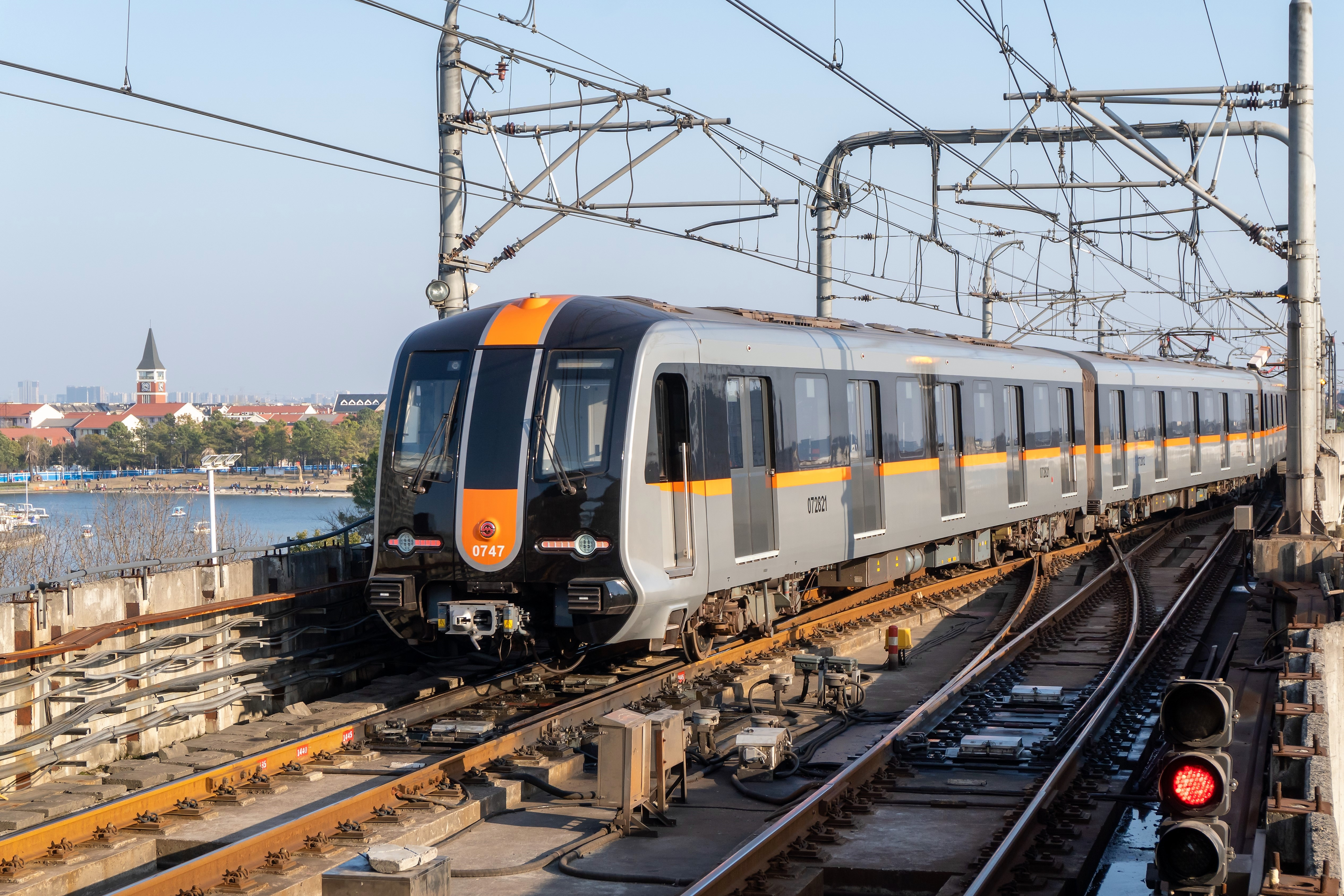
07A02 train
