= Huamu Road station =

Shanghai Metro station

Huamu Road 花木路
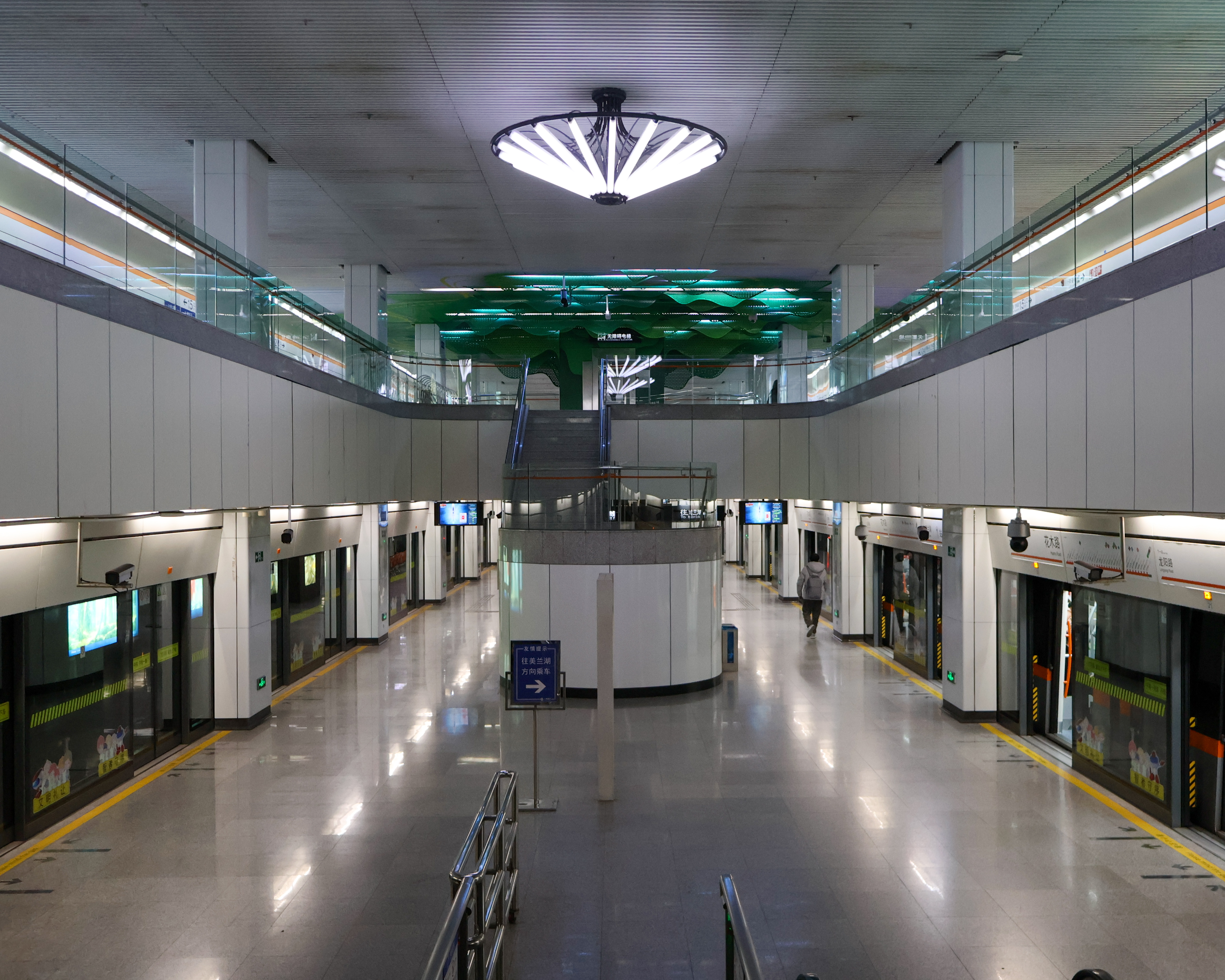
- Station platform

General information
- Location: Pudong New Area, Shanghai; China
- Coordinates: 31°12′44″N 121°33′31″E
- Operator: Shanghai No. 3 Metro Operation Co. Ltd.
- Line: Line 7
- Platforms: 2 (1 island platform)
- Tracks: 2

Construction
- Structure type: Underground
- Accessible: Yes

History
- Opened: December 5, 2009; 16 years ago

Services
Preceding station	Shanghai Metro	Following station
Longyang Road towards Meilan Lake	Line 7	Terminus
Location

Huamu Road (Chinese: 花木路; pinyin: Huāmù Lù) is a station on Line 7 of the Shanghai Metro.

This station is the eastern terminus of Line 7, and entered operation on December 5, 2009. It is part of the first phase of Line 7. The station was originally named Fangdian Road.

The station is located in the Pudong New Area.

== Gallery ==
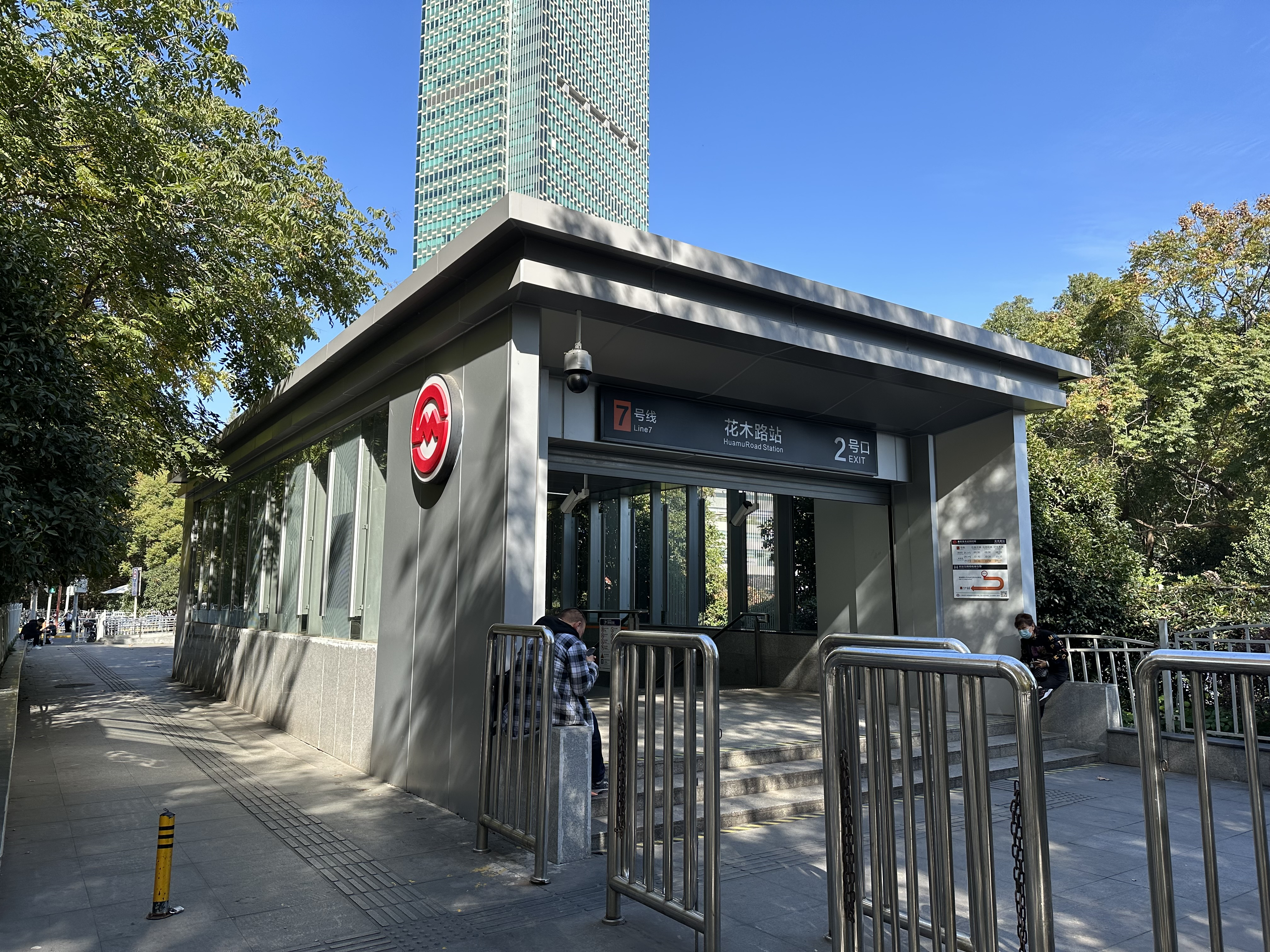
Exit 2

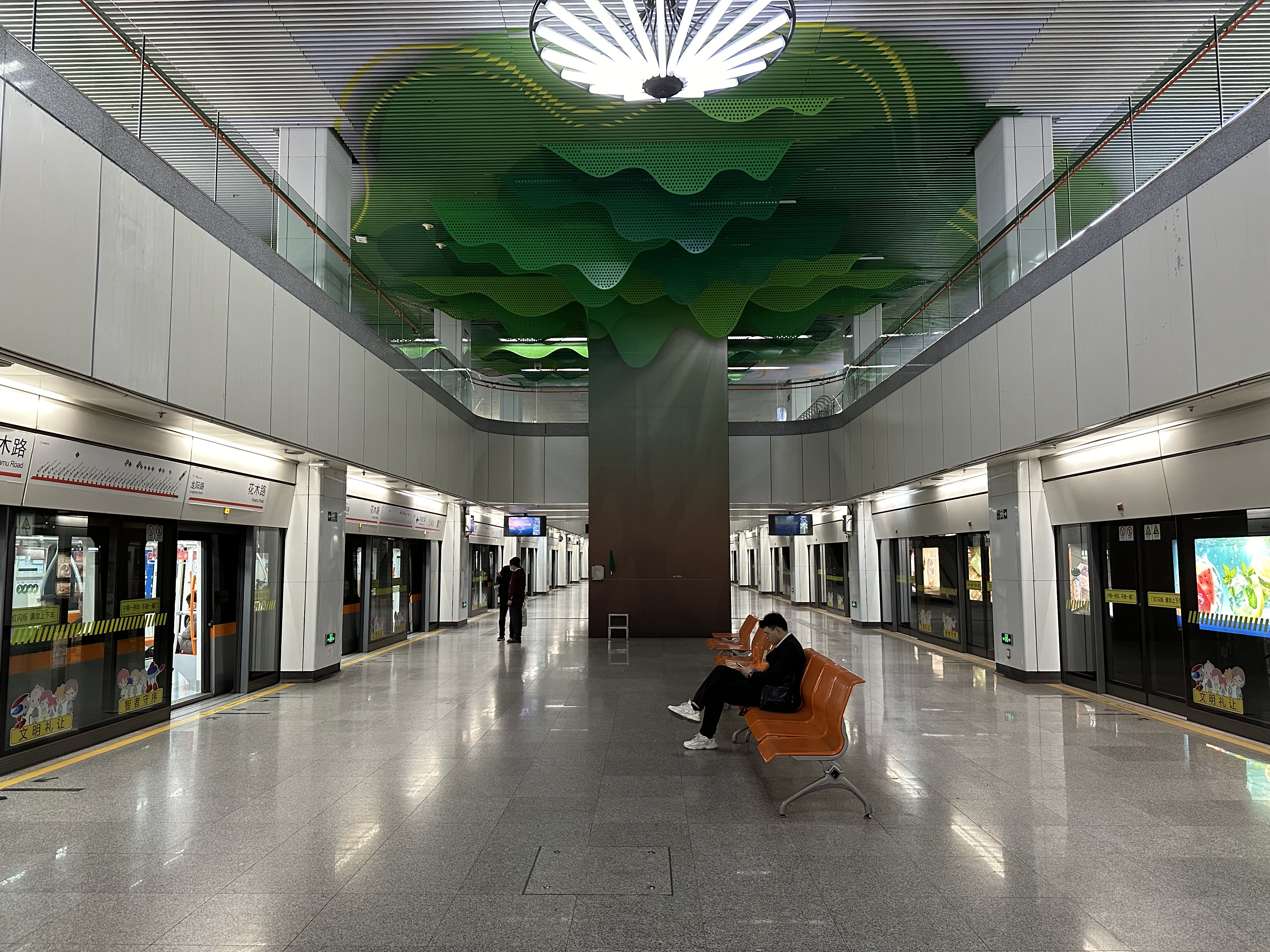
Platform
