= Meilan Lake station =

Metro station in Shanghai, China

Meilan Lake 美兰湖
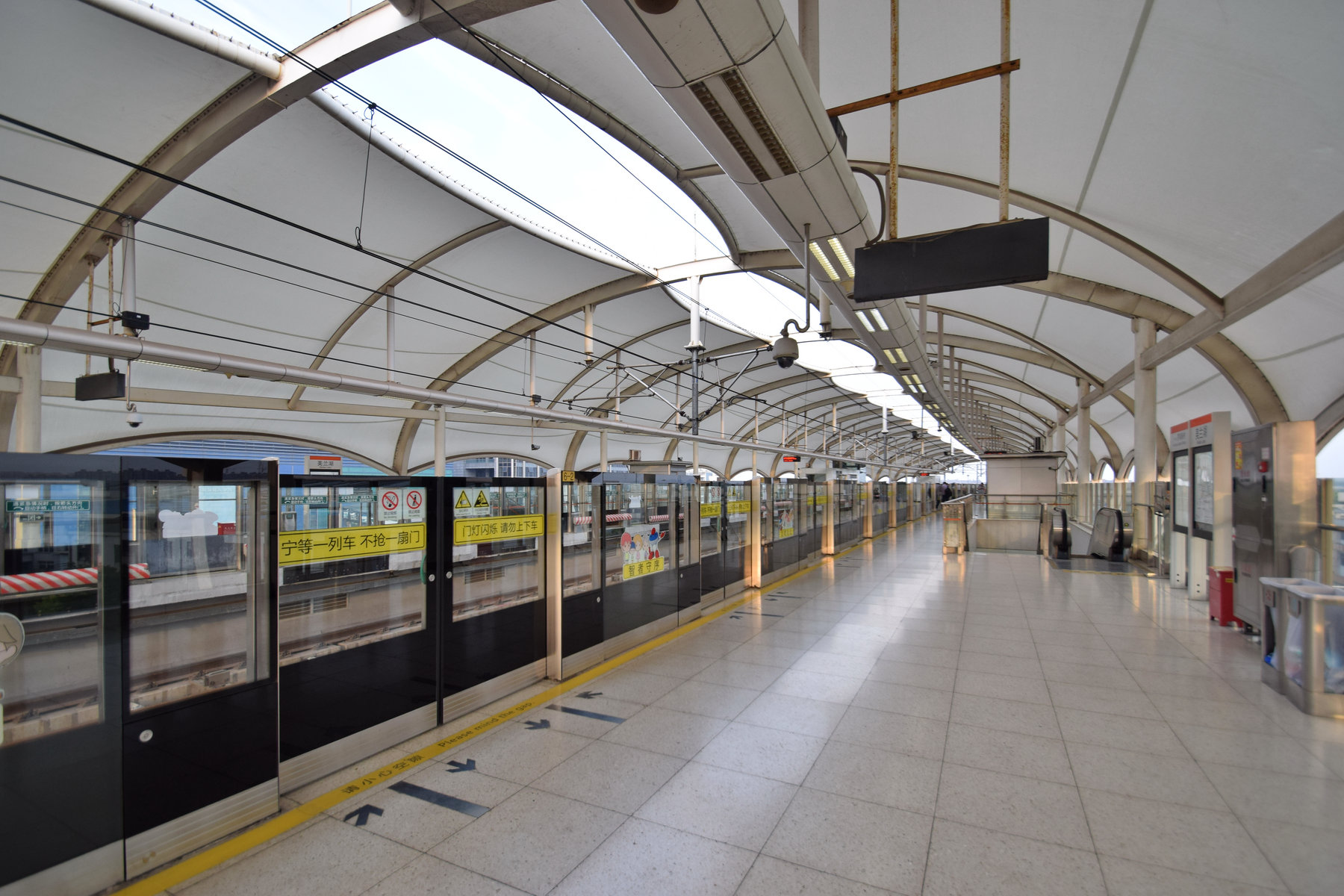
- Station platform

General information
- Location: Luodian, Baoshan District, Shanghai; China
- Coordinates: 31.4036°N 121.345°E
- Operated by: Shanghai No. 3 Metro Operation Co. Ltd.
- Line: Line 7
- Platforms: 2 (2 side platforms)
- Tracks: 2

Construction
- Structure type: Elevated
- Accessible: Yes

History
- Opened: 28 December 2009

Services
Preceding station	Shanghai Metro	Following station
Terminus	Line 7	Luonan Xincun towards Huamu Road
Location

Meilan Lake (simplified Chinese: 美兰湖; traditional Chinese: 美蘭湖; pinyin: Měilánhú) is a station on Shanghai Metro Line 7.

This station is the northern terminus of Line 7, and was opened on December 28, 2009. It is part of the second phase of Line 7. The station is located in the town of Luodian, in Shanghai's Baoshan District.
