= List of members of the 14th National People's Congress =

Deputies to Chinese legislature since 2023

The 14th National People's Congress (NPC) is the sitting electoral term of the "supreme organ of state power" of the People's Republic of China. It convened in Beijing, on 5 March 2023, and is scheduled to continue until March 2028. Elections took place from October 2022 to February 2023 across each Chinese province to choose the new Congress.

The following is a list of deputies to the 14th National People's Congress, with changes in deputies at the end.

== Makeup ==
=== Seat distribution ===
| Major party | General Secretary | Seats |
|---|---|---|
| Chinese Communist Party | Xi Jinping | ? |
| Other Parties | Chairperson | Seats |
| Chinese Peasants' and Workers' Democratic Party | He Wei | 60 |
| Jiusan Society | Wu Weihua | 56 |
| China Democratic League | Ding Zhongli | 56 |
| China Association for Promoting Democracy | Cai Dafeng | 54 |
| China National Democratic Construction Association | Hao Mingjin | 44 |
| Revolutionary Committee of the Chinese Kuomintang | Zheng Jianbang | 41 |
| Taiwan Democratic Self-Government League | Su Hui | 14 |
| China Zhi Gong Party | Jiang Zuojun | 39 |
| Independents | N/A | ? |

=== Standing Committee ===
| Major party | Seats |
|---|---|
| Chinese Communist Party | 117 |
| Other Parties | Seats |
| China Democratic League | 9 |
| China Association for Promoting Democracy | 7 |
| Revolutionary Committee of the Chinese Kuomintang | 6 |
| Jiusan Society | 5 |
| Chinese Peasants' and Workers' Democratic Party | 5 |
| China National Democratic Construction Association | 4 |
| Taiwan Democratic Self-Government League | 4 |
| China Zhi Gong Party | 3 |
| Independents | 13 |

== List ==
=== Beijing (54) ===
On January 19, 2023, the first session of the 16th Beijing Municipal People's Congress elected 53 deputies to the National People's Congress.

Beijing
| Name | Party | Gender | Ethnicity | Birth Month | Position | Notes |
|---|---|---|---|---|---|---|
| Ma Yide | China Zhi Gong Party | Male | Han | March 1967 | Intellectual Property scholar, Professor of Public Policy at University of Chinese Academy of Sciences Vice chairman of the China Intellectual Property Law Society | |
| Ma Xu | China National Democratic Construction Association | Male | Manchu | September 1963 | Director of the National Health Commission Institute of Science and Technology | |
| Wang Shaofeng | Chinese Communist Party | Male | Han | June 1963 | Vice Minister of Human Resources and Social Security and Vice Chairman of the All-China Federation of Trade Unions | |
| Wang Zheng | Chinese Communist Party | Female | Han | February 1995 | Leader of Yufa Toll Management Office at the Beijing-Kaifeng Expressway | |
| Wang Hong | Revolutionary Committee of the Chinese Kuomintang | Female | Manchu | May 1962 | Director of the State Oceanic Administration | Member of the Standing Committee of the National People's Congress |
| Wang Zugang | Chinese Communist Party | Male | Han | 1988 | Deputy Manager of Shijiazhuang Project Department of Fengqiao Company of China Railway Sixth Bureau Group | |
| Wang Xiqin | Chinese Communist Party | Male | Han | June 1968 | Former President of Tsinghua University | Member of the Standing Committee of the National People's Congress |
| Wang Chunfa | Chinese Communist Party | Male | Han | November 1963 | Director of the National Museum of China | |
| Qi Yanjun | Chinese Communist Party | Male | Han | October 1964 | Deputy Mayor of Beijing Municipal Government | |
| 创建“文献 | Chinese Communist Party | Male | Han | April 1969 | Chinese Communist Party Committee Secretary of Chaoyang District | |
| Fang Fuquan | China Association for Promoting Democracy | Male | Han | October 1964 | President of Capital Normal University | |
| Yin Li | Chinese Communist Party | Male | Han | August 1962 | Communist Party Secretary of Beijing, former Governor of Sichuan Province | Member of the Poliburo of the Chinese Communist Party |
| Xing Weibing | Chinese Communist Party | Male | Han | February 1963 | Secretary of the Miaofengshan branch of the Communist Party | |
| Zhu Yapin | Chinese Communist Party | Male | Han | March 1966 | Chief Prosecutor of Beijing Municipal People's Procuratorate | |
| Yi Tong | Independent | Female | Manchu | February 1967 | Director of Innovation at the Beijing Academy of Science and Technology | |
| Liu Wei | Chinese Communist Party | Male | Han | June 1965 | President of Beijing People's Association for Friendship with Foreign Countries | |
| Liu Mingqun | Chinese Communist Party | Female | Han | May 1972 | Sanitation worker at Shijingshan District Sanitation Center | |
| Qi Jing | Chinese Communist Party | Female | Han | August 1963 | Director of the Party Leadership Group of the Beijing Municipal People's Congress Standing Committee | |
| Yan Aoshuang | China Zhi Gong Party | Female | Han | August 1963 | Vice Chairman of the Zhi Gong Party, Vice Chairman of the Western Returned Scholars Association | Member of the Standing Committee of the National People's Congress |
| Ruan Xiangyan | Chinese Communist Party | Female | Han | July 1965 | Director of the Department of Gynecological Endocrinology at the Beijing Obstetrics and Gynecology Hospital, Capital Medical University | |
| Sun Zezhou | Chinese Communist Party | Male | Han | November 1970 | Chief Designer of Chang'e-3, Chang'e-4 and Tianwen-1 | |
| Li Chenggui | China Democratic League | Male | Han | September 1966 | President of Beijing Academy of Agricultural and Forestry Sciences | |
| Li Xiuling | Chinese Communist Party | Male | Han | December 1962 | Secretary of the Party Leadership Group and Chairman of the Standing Committee of Beijing Municipal Congress | |
| Li Shushen | Chinese Communist Party | Male | Han | March 1963 | Vice President of the Chinese Academy of Sciences, President of the University of Chinese Academy of Sciences | |
| Wu Huaxia | Chinese Communist Party | Female | Han | October 1983 | Deputy General Manager of Beijing Qianmen Duyichu Catering Company | |
| Wu Chen | Independent | Male | Han | August 1967 | Chief Architect at the Beijing Institute of Architectural Design and the Shougang Group | |
| He Shaohua | Chinese Communist Party | Female | Hui | | Tram Driver | |
| Zhang Jiandong | Chinese Communist Party | Male | Han | July 1962 | Vice Chairman of Beijing Municipal People's Congress Standing Committee | |
| Zhang Haiou | Independent | Female | Han | September 1980 | Pharmacist | |
| Chen Jian | Chinese Communist Party | Male | Han | April 1964 | Director of the Beijing Municipal Supervisory Commission and the Beijing Municipal Commission for Discipline | |
| Wu Zeng | Chinese Communist Party | Female | Han | | Director of Legislative Affairs | Member of the Standing Committee of the National People's Congress |
| Lin Shangli | Chinese Communist Party | Male | Han | November 1963 | President of Renmin University of China | |
| Yue Qiaoyun | Independent | Female | Han | May 1983 | Marketing Executive from Pinggu District | |
| Pang Lijuan | China Association for Promoting Democracy | Female | Han | August 1962 | Academic, former University professor at Beijing Normal University, University of California, Berkeley, and Stanford University | Member of the Standing Committee of the National People's Congress |
| Zheng Zhajie | Chinese Communist Party | Male | Han | November 1961 | Director of the National Development and Reform Commission | Transferred from Anhui Provincial Delegation |
| Zhao Minge | Chinese Communist Party | Male | Han | June 1966 | General Manager of Shougang Group | |
| Hao Ping | Chinese Communist Party | Male | Han | September 1959 | Communist Party Secretary of Peking University, former President of Peking University and Beijing Foreign Studies University | Member of the Standing Committee of the National People's Congress |
| Yao Ming | Independent | Male | Han | September 1980 | Former Basketball player, Chairman of the Chinese Basketball Association | |
| He Hong | Chinese Peasants' and Workers' Democratic Party | Male | Han | January 1965 | Researcher at the Chinese Academy of Sciences's Research Center for Eco-Environmental Sciences, deputy director of Institute of Urban Environment, and academician of the Chinese Academy of Engineering. | |
| Jia Wenqin | China Zhi Gong Party | Female | Han | August 1965 | Director of Beijing Regulatory Bureau of China Securities Regulatory Commission | |
| Xia Linmao | Chinese Communist Party | Male | Han | May 1970 | Deputy Secretary of the Party Leadership Group of Beijing Municipal Government | |
| Gu Weiying | China Democratic League | Female | Han | | Actress at the Northern Kunqu Opera Theater | |
| Yin Yong | Chinese Communist Party | Male | Han | August 1969 | Mayor of Beijing | |
| Gao Zicheng | Chinese Communist Party | Male | Han | February 1962 | Lawyer, President of the All-China Lawyers Association, President of the Beijing Lawyers Association | |
| Guo Lei | Independent | Male | Han | April 1966 | Professor of Beijing University of Aeronautics and Astronautics | |
| Yan Jianguo | Jiusan Society | Male | Han | July 1960 | Lawyer at Beijing Xinli Law Firm | |
| Kou Fang | Chinese Communist Party | Male | Han | October 1963 | President of Beijing High People's Court | |
| Ge Haijiao | Chinese Communist Party | Male | Han | December 1971 | Bank executive, Communist Party Secretary of the Bank of China | Transferred from Hebei Provincial Delegation |
| Dong Jin | Chinese Communist Party | Male | Han | | Artificial Intelligence Scholar, Dean of Edge Computing Research Institute | |
| Cheng Jing | China National Democratic Construction Association | Male | Han | July 1963 | Professor at Tsinghua University School of Medicine, Vice-chairman of the China National Democratic Construction Association | Member of the Standing Committee of the National People's Congress |
| Lei Jun | Independent | Male | Han | December 1969 | Billionaire and Investor, chairman and CEO of Xiaomi Corporation | |
| Dou Xiaoyu | Independent | Female | Han | June 1967 | Manager of the China Aerospace Science and Industry Corporation | |
| Guan Wenhui | Chinese Communist Party | Female | Manchu | | Inspector at the Beijing Qiyiba Yousheng Electronics Company | |
| Mu Peng | Chinese Communist Party | | | | | |

== Changes in membership ==
- By-election: Hu Yuting (CCP member, Jilin delegation), Tang Dengjie (CCP member, Shanxi delegation), Huang Lixin (CCP member, Shanghai delegation)
- Removal: Dong Yunhu (CCP member, Shanghai delegation), Zhong Yang (CCP member, Guizhou delegation), Zhang Zhenzhong (CCP member, PLA and PAP delegation), Zhang Yulin (CCP member, PLA and PAP delegation), Ding Laihang (NPCSC member, CCP member, PLA and PAP delegation), Lu Hong (CCP member, PLA and PAP delegation), Li Yuchao (CCP member, PLA and PAP delegation), Rao Wenmin (CCP member, PLA and PAP delegation), Ju Xinchun (CCP member, PLA and PAP delegation), Li Chuanguang (CCP member, PLA and PAP delegation), Zhou Yaning (NPCSC member, CCP member, PLA and PAP delegation), Wang Yixin (CCP member, Heilongjiang delegation), Sun Biao (CCP member, Heilongjiang delegation), Hu Jianwen (CCP member, Hunan delegation), Lei Dongzhu (CCP member, Hunan delegation), Zhu Hong (CCP member, Guangdong delegation), An Jiuxiong (CCP member, Guizhou delegation), Li Zhihong (CCP member, PLA and PAP delegation)
- Resignation: Huang Jiawu (Independent, Guangdong delegation), Qin Gang (CCP member, Tianjin delegation), Feng Jiehong (CCP member, Hubei delegation), Lu Weiwei (Guangxi delegation)
- Death: Zhang Hongxing (CCP member, Chongqing delegation), Jiang Kaili (CDL member, Liaoning delegation)

== See also ==
- List of members of the National People's Congress
