= Zhenbei Road station =

Shanghai Metro station

Zhenbei Road 真北路
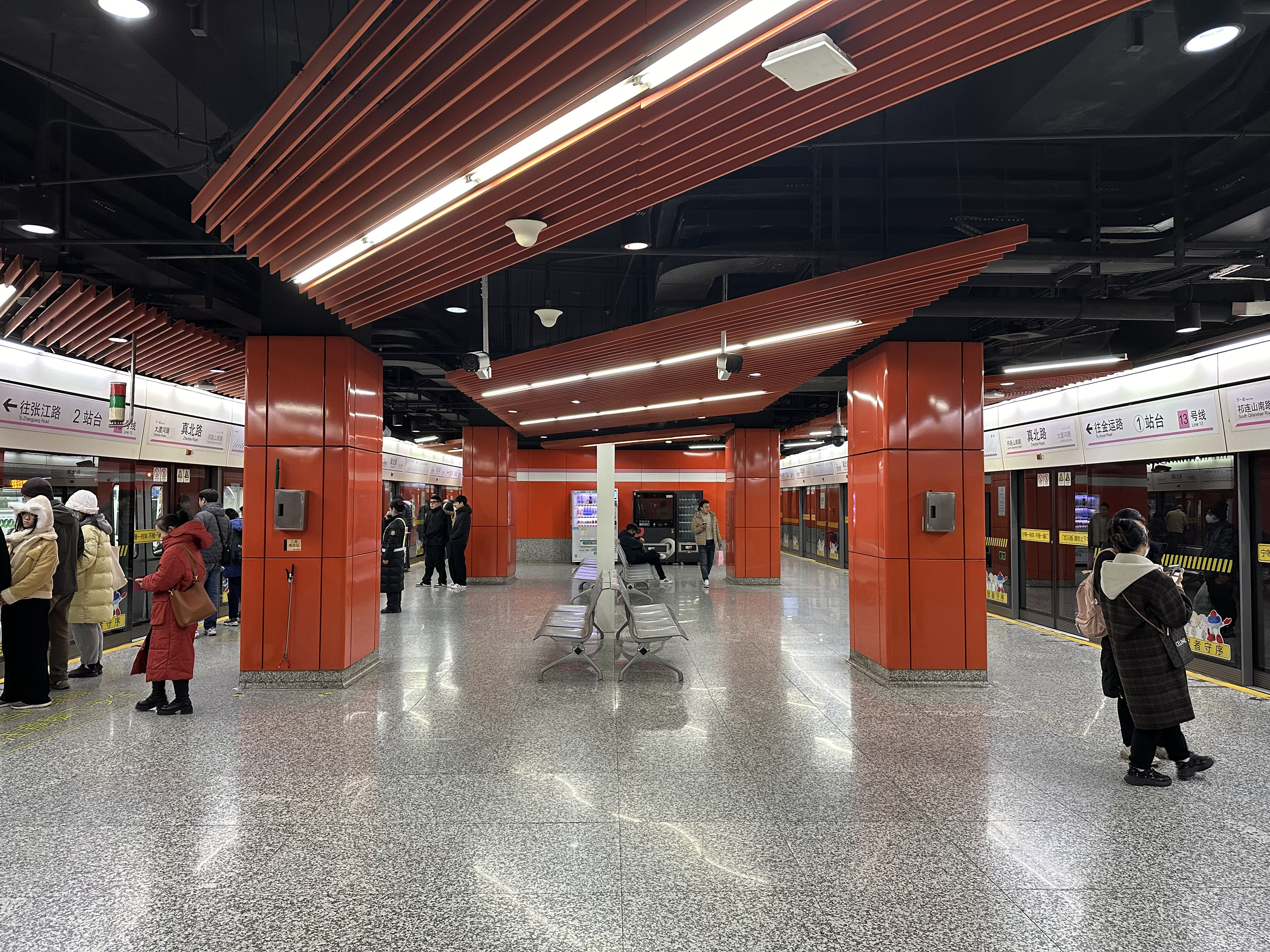
- Station platform

General information
- Location: Jinshajiang Road and Zhenbei Road (真北路); Putuo District, Shanghai; China
- Coordinates: 31.23396°N 121.37747°E
- Operated by: Shanghai No. 2 Metro Operation Co., Ltd.
- Line: Line 13
- Platforms: 2 (1 island platform)
- Tracks: 2

Construction
- Structure type: Underground
- Accessible: Yes

History
- Opened: 30 December 2012

Services
Preceding station	Shanghai Metro	Following station
South Qilianshan Road towards Jinyun Road	Line 13	Daduhe Road towards Zhangjiang Road
Location

Zhenbei Road (Chinese: 真北路; pinyin: Zhēnběi Lù) is a station on Line 13 of the Shanghai Metro. It is located in Putuo District, Shanghai.

The station was excavated in the soft clay.

== Sources ==
- Tan, Yong; Wei, Bin; Zhou, Xin; Diao, Yanping (2015). "Lessons Learned from Construction of Shanghai Metro Stations: Importance of Quick Excavation, Prompt Propping, Timely Casting, and Segmented Construction". Journal of Performance of Constructed Facilities. 29 (4). American Society of Civil Engineers (ASCE). doi:10.1061/(asce)cf.1943-5509.0000599. ISSN 0887-3828.
