= Changzheng (disambiguation) =

The Long March, also known as Changzheng (simplified Chinese: 长征; traditional Chinese: 長征; pinyin: Cháng Zhēng), was a military retreat undertaken by the Chinese Red Army of the Chinese Communist Party from 1934 to 1935.

Changzheng may also refer to:

- Changzheng, Guizhou (zh), town in and subdivision of Honghuagang District, Zunyi, Guizhou
- Changzheng, Hainan (zh), town in and subdivision of Qiongzhong Li and Miao Autonomous County, Hainan
- Changzheng Ri, a mountain in Tibet
- Changzheng, Shanghai, town in and subdivision of Putuo District, Shanghai
- Changzheng Subdistrict, Baiyin (zh), subdivision of Pingchuan District, Baiyin, Gansu
- Changzheng Subdistrict, Shangqiu (zh), subdivision of Liangyuan District, Shangqiu, Henan
- Changzheng Subdistrict, Liaoyang (zh), subdivision of Hongwei District, Liaoyang, Liaoning
- Changzheng Street Subdistrict (zh), subdivision of Xinfu District, Xinzhou, Shanxi

== See also ==
- Long March (rocket family)
