= GYE =

GYE or Gye may refer to:

== People ==
- Gye of Baekje (died 354), king of Baekje 344–346
- Gye of Samhan, king of Mahan confederacy 33 BC–17 BC
- Frederick Gye (1810–1878), English opera manager
- Harold Frederick Neville Gye (1888–1967), Australian cartoonist
- William Ewart Gye (1889–1952), British paleontologist (né Bullock)
- Elsa Gye (1881–1943), music student and suffragette
- Gye family or Gøye family, a Danish noble family

== Other uses ==
- Gye, Meurthe-et-Moselle, a commune in France
- Greater Yellowstone Ecosystem
- Guinness Yeast Extract, an Irish savoury spread
- Gynecological Endocrinology, a medical journal
- Gyem language, native to Nigeria
- José Joaquín de Olmedo International Airport, in Guayaquil, Ecuador
