= Qi'an Road station =

Metro station in Shanghai, China

Qi'an Road 祁安路
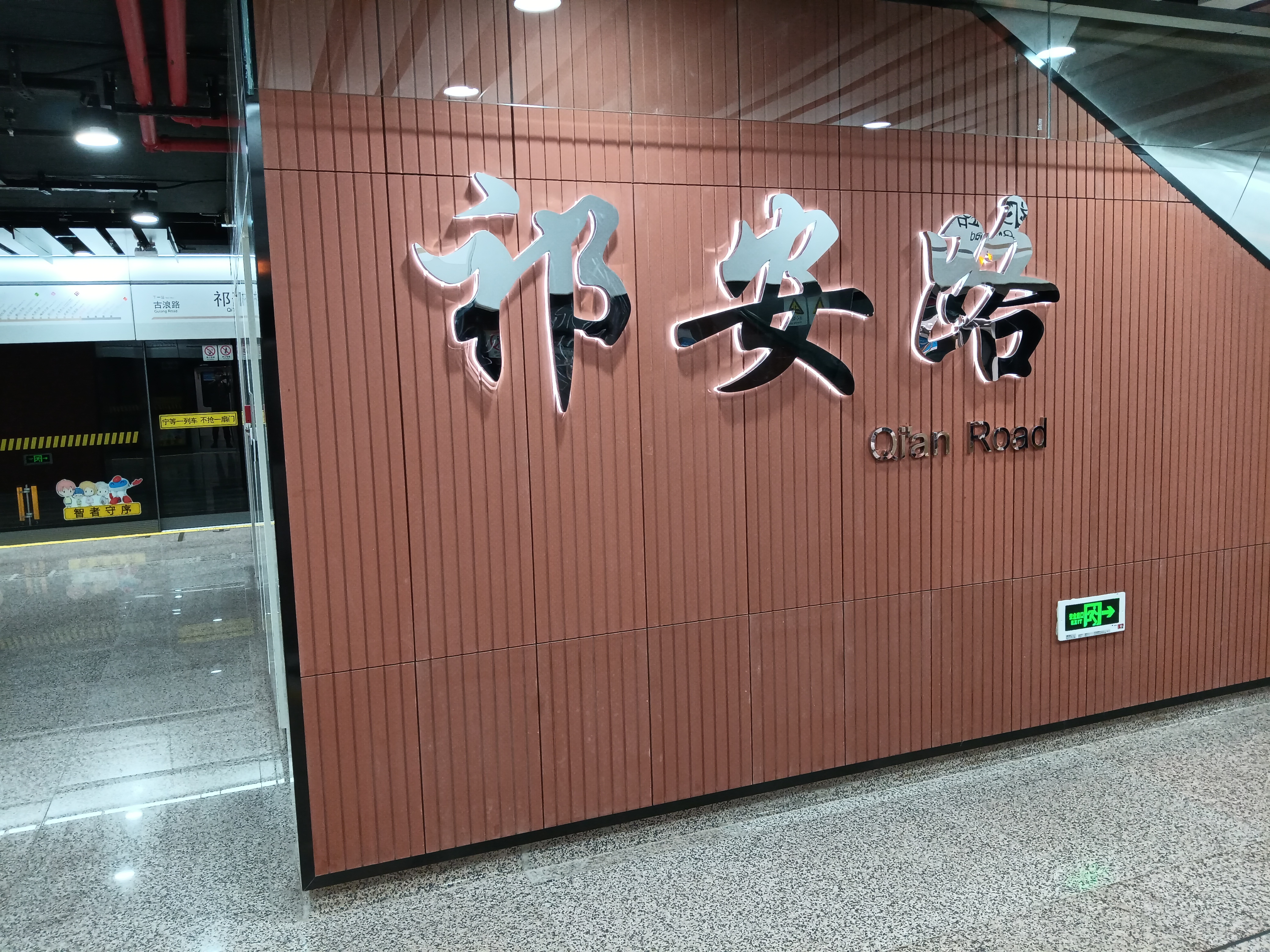
- Platform

General information
- Location: Qi'an Road and Lianliang Road, Putuo District, Shanghai; China
- Coordinates: 31.29331°N 121.38094°E
- Line: Line 15
- Platforms: 2 (1 island platform)
- Tracks: 2

Construction
- Structure type: Underground
- Accessible: Yes

History
- Opened: 23 January 2021

Services
Preceding station	Shanghai Metro	Following station
Nanda Road towards Gucun Park	Line 15	Gulang Road towards Zizhu Hi-tech Park
Location

Qi'an Road (Chinese: 祁安路; pinyin: Qí'ān Lù) is a metro station on the Line 15 of the Shanghai Metro. Located at the intersection of Qi'an Road and Lianliang Road in Putuo District, Shanghai, the station was scheduled to open with the rest of Line 15 by the end of 2020. However, the station eventually opened on 23 January 2021 following a one-month postponement. It is located in between Nanda Road station to the north and Gulang Road station to the south.

== Accident ==
On January 22, 2022, a passenger was caught by a platform screen door when getting off the train at the station. The staff set the screen door to isolate mode (stop detection), causing the automatic train operation system to ignore this screen door and the train began to depart, dragging the passenger for a distance before it was stopped. The passenger was taken to hospital for treatment but died from his injuries. Relevant management departments have investigated the accident and issued a notice requiring the operator to review the incident.
