= North Meiling Road station =

Metro station in Shanghai, China

North Meiling Road 梅岭北路
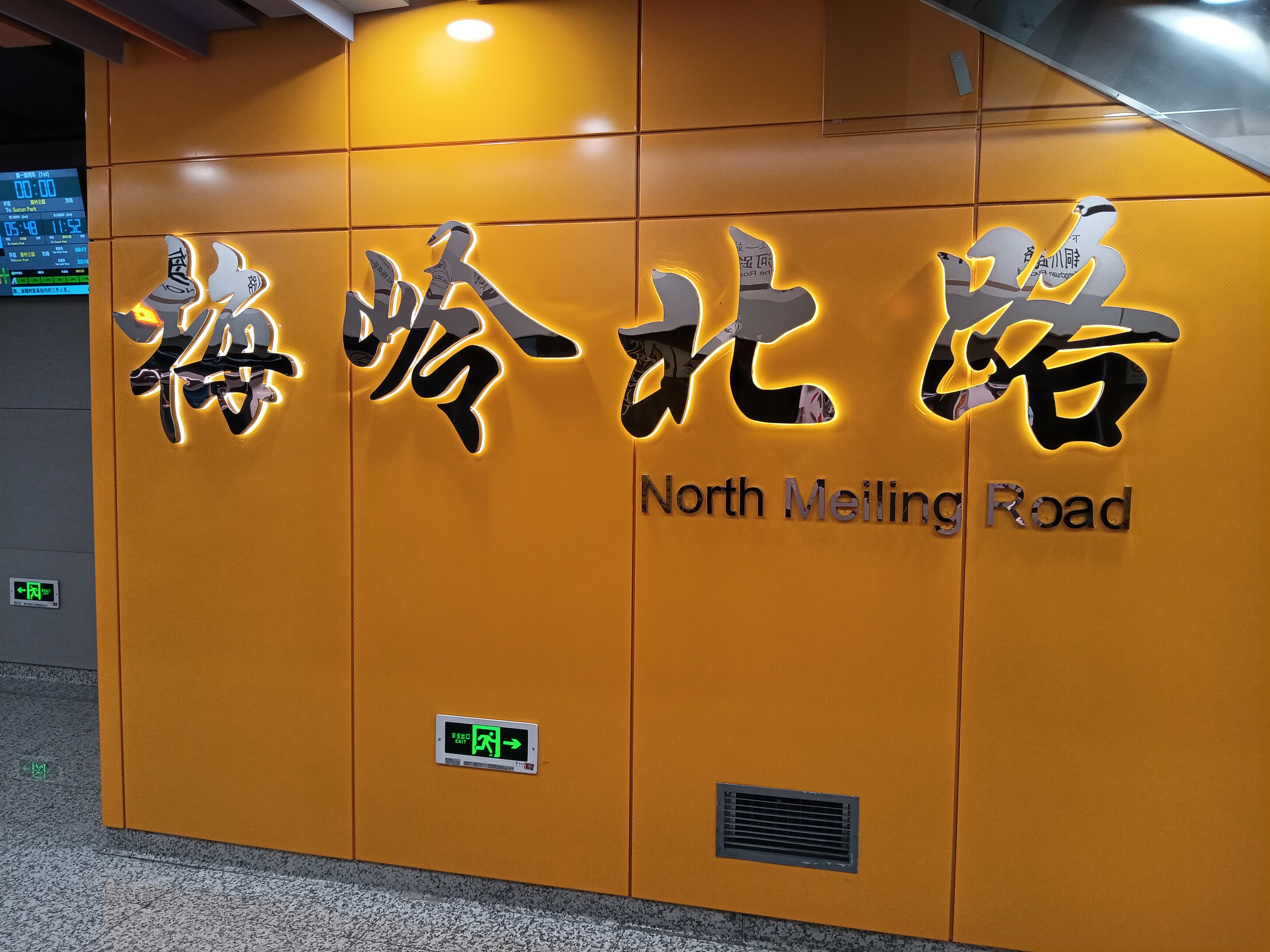
- Platform Sign

General information
- Location: Daduhe Road and North Meiling Road, Putuo District, Shanghai; China
- Coordinates: 31.2451°N 121.3921°E
- Line: Line 15
- Platforms: 2 (1 island platform)
- Tracks: 2

Construction
- Structure type: Underground
- Accessible: Yes

History
- Opened: 23 January 2021

Services
Preceding station	Shanghai Metro	Following station
Tongchuan Road towards Gucun Park	Line 15	Daduhe Road towards Zizhu Hi-tech Park
Location

North Meiling Road (simplified Chinese: 梅岭北路; traditional Chinese: 梅嶺北路; pinyin: Méilǐng Běilù) is a metro station on the Line 15 of the Shanghai Metro. Located at the intersection of Daduhe Road and North Meiling Road in Putuo District, Shanghai, the station was scheduled to open with the rest of Line 15 by the end of 2020. However, the station eventually opened on 23 January 2021 following a one-month postponement. It is located in between Tongchuan Road station to the north and Daduhe Road station to the south.
