= O.C.T. Mami =

Chinese maternity wear company

- Industry: Clothing
- Founded: 1997
- Headquarters: Putuo District, Shanghai, China
- Products: Maternity wear
- Website: www.octmami.com

O.C.T. Mami (simplified Chinese: 十月妈咪; traditional Chinese: 十月媽咪; pinyin: Shíyuè Māmi "October Mommy") is a Chinese maternity wear brand and manufacturer, headquartered in Putuo District, Shanghai. As of 2014 it is the largest such company in the country. The "O.C.T." in the company's English name refers to October, the tenth month of the year. In Chinese belief a pregnancy is ten months long.

It was founded in 1997 by Zhao Pu "Paul" (赵 浦), a graduate of Nanjing University, and his wife, Tu Wenhong (涂文虹). Zhao had worked for an apparel manufacturer based in Taiwan before starting O.C.T. Mami.

In 2007 the company's annual revenue was 70 million RMB ($9.6 million USD). That year the company signed a deal for the endorsement of Taiwanese actress Dee Shu, as part of its advertising campaign.
