= Tongchuan Road station =

Metro station in Shanghai, China

Tongchuan Road 铜川路
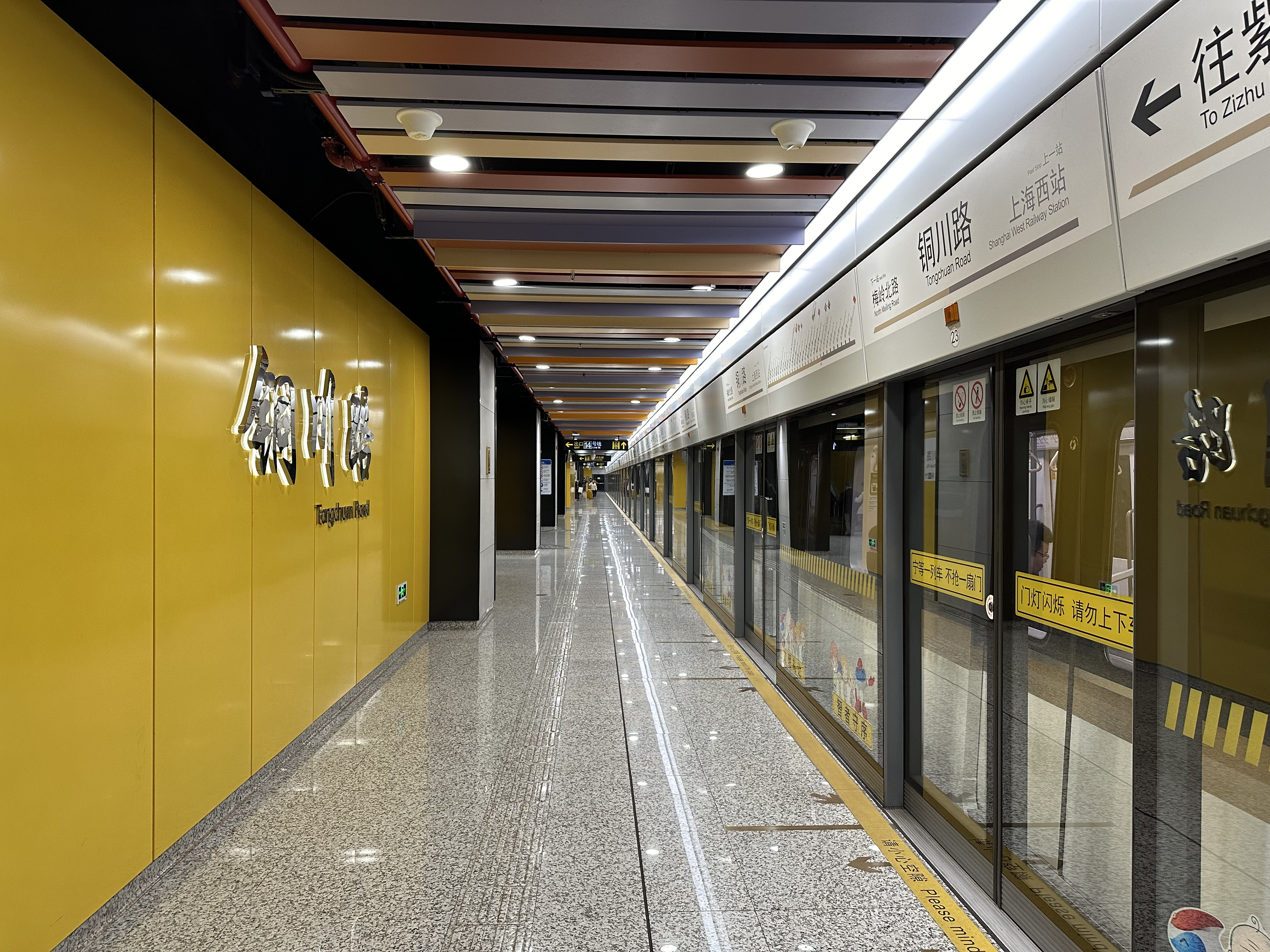
- Platform of Line 15

General information
- Location: Daduhe Road and Tongchuan Road, Putuo District, Shanghai; China
- Coordinates: 31.252570°N 121.392751°E
- Line: Line 14; Line 15
- Platforms: 4 (2 island platforms)
- Tracks: 4

Construction
- Structure type: Underground
- Accessible: Yes

History
- Opened: 23 January 2021 (Line 15); 30 December 2021 (Line 14)

Services
Preceding station	Shanghai Metro	Following station
Zhenguang Road towards Fengbang	Line 14	Zhenru towards Guiqiao Road
Shanghai West Railway Station towards Gucun Park	Line 15	North Meiling Road towards Zizhu Hi-tech Park
Location

Tongchuan Road (simplified Chinese: 铜川路; traditional Chinese: 銅川路) is an interchange station of the Line 15 and Line 14 of the Shanghai Metro. Located at the intersection of Daduhe Road and Tongchuan Road in the city's Putuo District, the station was scheduled to open in 2020, when both lines were expected to begin operations. However, the station eventually opened on 23 January 2021 following a one-month postponement of the line 15. The station later became an interchange after Line 14 opened on 30 December 2021.

== Station layout ==
1F	Ground level	Exits
B1	Concourse	Tickets, Service Center
B2	Platform 1	← Line 14 towards Fengbang (Zhenguang Road)
B2	Island platform, doors open on the left
B2	Platform 2	Line 14 towards Guiqiao Road (Zhenru) →
B3	Platform 4	← Line 15 towards Gucun Park (Shanghai West Railway Station)
B3	Island platform, doors open on the left
B3	Platform 3	Line 15 towards Zizhu Hi-tech Park (North Meiling Road) →

=== Entrances/exits ===
- 1: Daduhe Road, Zhenru Park
- 2: Tongchuan Road, Daduhe Road
- 3: Tongchuan Road, Daduhe Road
- 4: Tongchuan Road
- 5: Daduhe Road
