= East Wuwei Road station =

Metro station in Shanghai, China

East Wuwei Road 武威东路
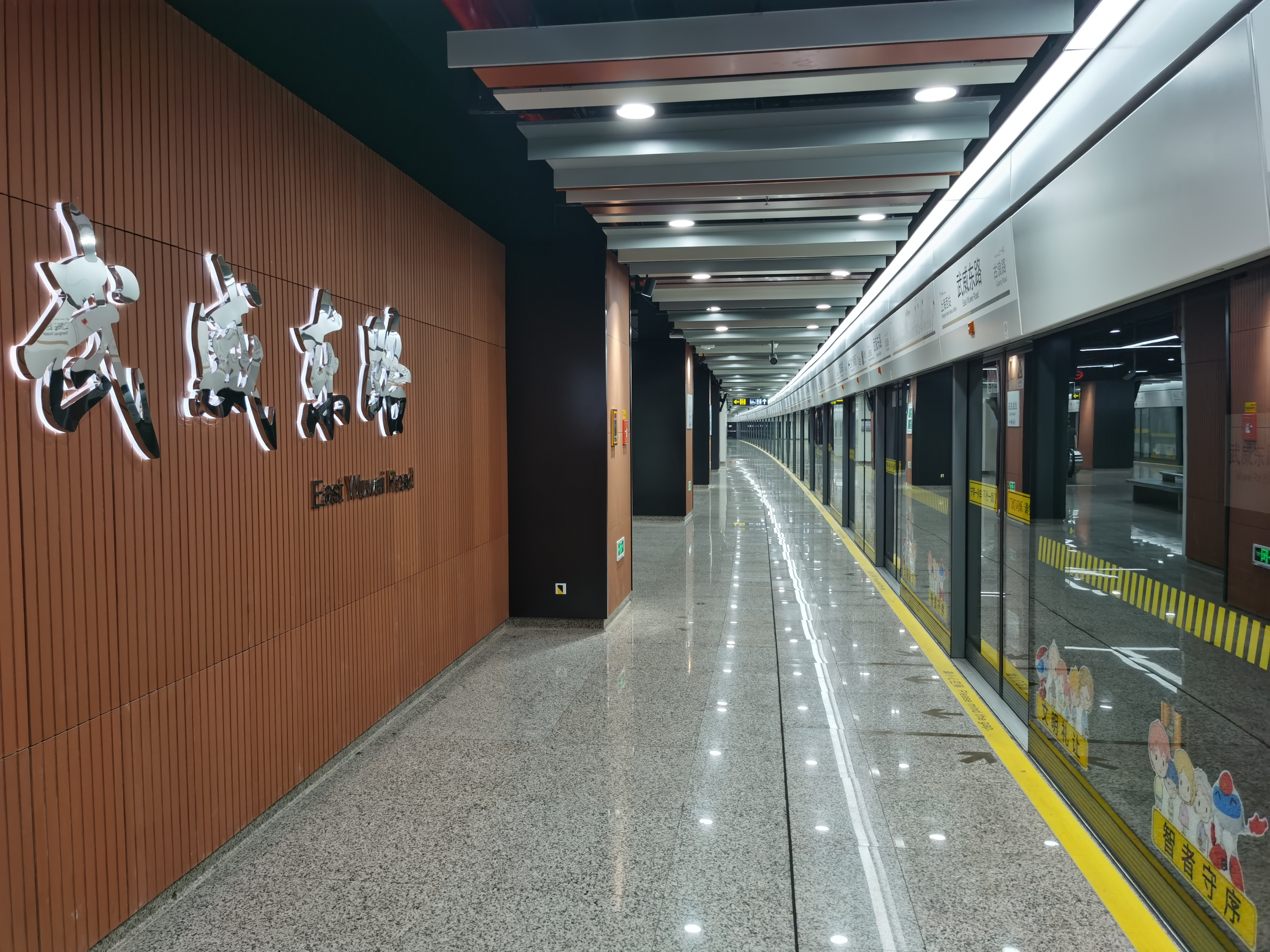

General information
- Location: East Wuwei Road and West Taopu Road, Putuo District, Shanghai; China
- Coordinates: 31.2773°N 121.3875°E
- Line: Line 15
- Platforms: 2 (1 island platform)
- Tracks: 2

Construction
- Structure type: Underground
- Accessible: Yes

History
- Opened: 23 January 2021

Services
| Preceding station | Shanghai Metro | Following station |
|---|---|---|
| Gulang Road towards Gucun Park | Line 15 | Shanghai West Railway Station towards Zizhu Hi-tech Park |
Location

East Wuwei Road (simplified Chinese: 武威东路; traditional Chinese: 武威東路; pinyin: Wǔwēi Dōnglù) is a metro station on Line 15 of the Shanghai Metro. Located at the intersection of East Wuwei Road and West Taopu Road in Putuo District, Shanghai, the station was scheduled to open with the rest of Line 15 by the end of 2020. However, the station eventually opened on 23 January 2021 following a one-month postponement. It is located in between Gulang Road station to the north and West Shanghai Railway Station station to the south.
