= List of members of the National People's Congress =

Lists of members of China's National People's Congress may refer to:

- List of members of the 1st National People's Congress
- List of members of the 2nd National People's Congress
- List of members of the 3rd National People's Congress
- List of members of the 4th National People's Congress
- List of members of the 5th National People's Congress
- List of members of the 6th National People's Congress
- List of members of the 7th National People's Congress
- List of members of the 8th National People's Congress
- List of members of the 9th National People's Congress]
- List of members of the 10th National People's Congress
- List of members of the 11th National People's Congress
- List of members of the 12th National People's Congress
- List of members of the 13th National People's Congress
- List of members of the 14th National People's Congress

== See also ==
- Standing Committee of the National People's Congress
