= Daduhe Road station =

Shanghai Metro station

Daduhe Road 大渡河路
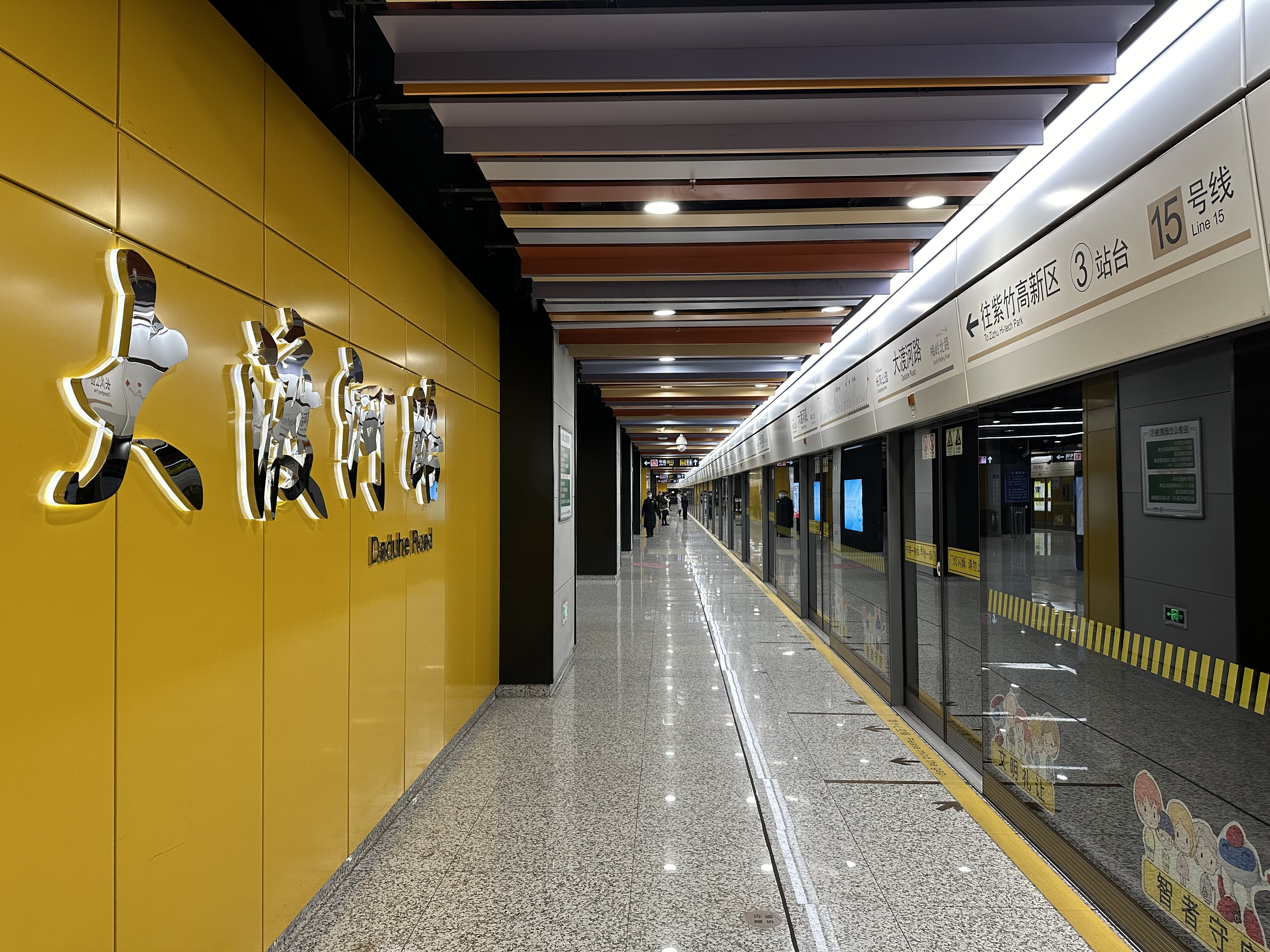
- Platform of Line 15

General information
- Location: Jinshajiang Road and Daduhe Road; Putuo District, Shanghai; China
- Coordinates: 31°14′01″N 121°23′25″E
- Operated by: Shanghai No. 2 Metro Operation Co., Ltd.
- Lines: Line 13; Line 15
- Platforms: 4 (2 side platforms and 1 island platform)
- Tracks: 5

Construction
- Structure type: Underground
- Accessible: Yes

History
- Opened: 1 November 2014 (Line 13); 23 January 2021 (Line 15)

Services
Preceding station	Shanghai Metro	Following station
Zhenbei Road towards Jinyun Road	Line 13	Jinshajiang Road towards Zhangjiang Road
North Meiling Road towards Gucun Park	Line 15	Changfeng Park towards Zizhu Hi-tech Park
Location

Daduhe Road (Chinese: 大渡河路; pinyin: Dàdùhé Lù) is an interchange station on Line 13 and Line 15 of the Shanghai Metro. It is located in Putuo District.

On 30 December 2012, Line 13 began providing service from Jinyun Road to the west to Jinshajiang Road to the east. However, this did not include the South Qilianshan Road or this station.

Line 13 has a storage track at this station. After the section from Jinshajiang Road station to Jinyun Road station opened on 30 December 2012, Line 13 used this storage track for single-track operation between this station and Jinshajiang Road station because Jinshajiang Road station did not have the conditions for train turnback. However, since there was no platform on the storage track, the station could not carry passengers in the direction of Jinshajiang Road, therefore the station did not have the conditions for opening. The opening of this station was postponed until 1 November 2014.

This station utilizes side platforms with three tracks running through the middle: one going towards Jinshajiang Road, one going towards Zhenbei Road, and a third used to store extra carriages.

== Station layout ==
1F	Ground level	Exits
B1	Concourse	Tickets, Service Center
B2	Side platform, doors open on the right
B2	Platform 1	← Line 13 towards Jinyun Road (Zhenbei Road)
B2	Platform 2	Line 13 towards Zhangjiang Road (Jinshajiang Road) →
B2	Side platform, doors open on the right
B3	Platform 4	← Line 15 towards Gucun Park (North Meiling Road)
B3	Island platform, doors open on the left
B3	Platform 3	Line 15 towards Zizhu Hi-tech Park (Changfeng Park) →

=== Entrances/exits ===
- 1: Jinshajiang Road, Daduhe Road
- 3: Jinshajiang Road, Zhongjiang Road
- 4: Jinshajiang Road, Zhongjiang Road
- 6: Daduhe Road, Jinshajiang Road
- 7: Daduhe Road
- 9: Daduhe Road, Jinshajiang Road
