= Shanghai West Railway Station metro station =

Shanghai Metro station

Shanghai West Railway Station 上海西站
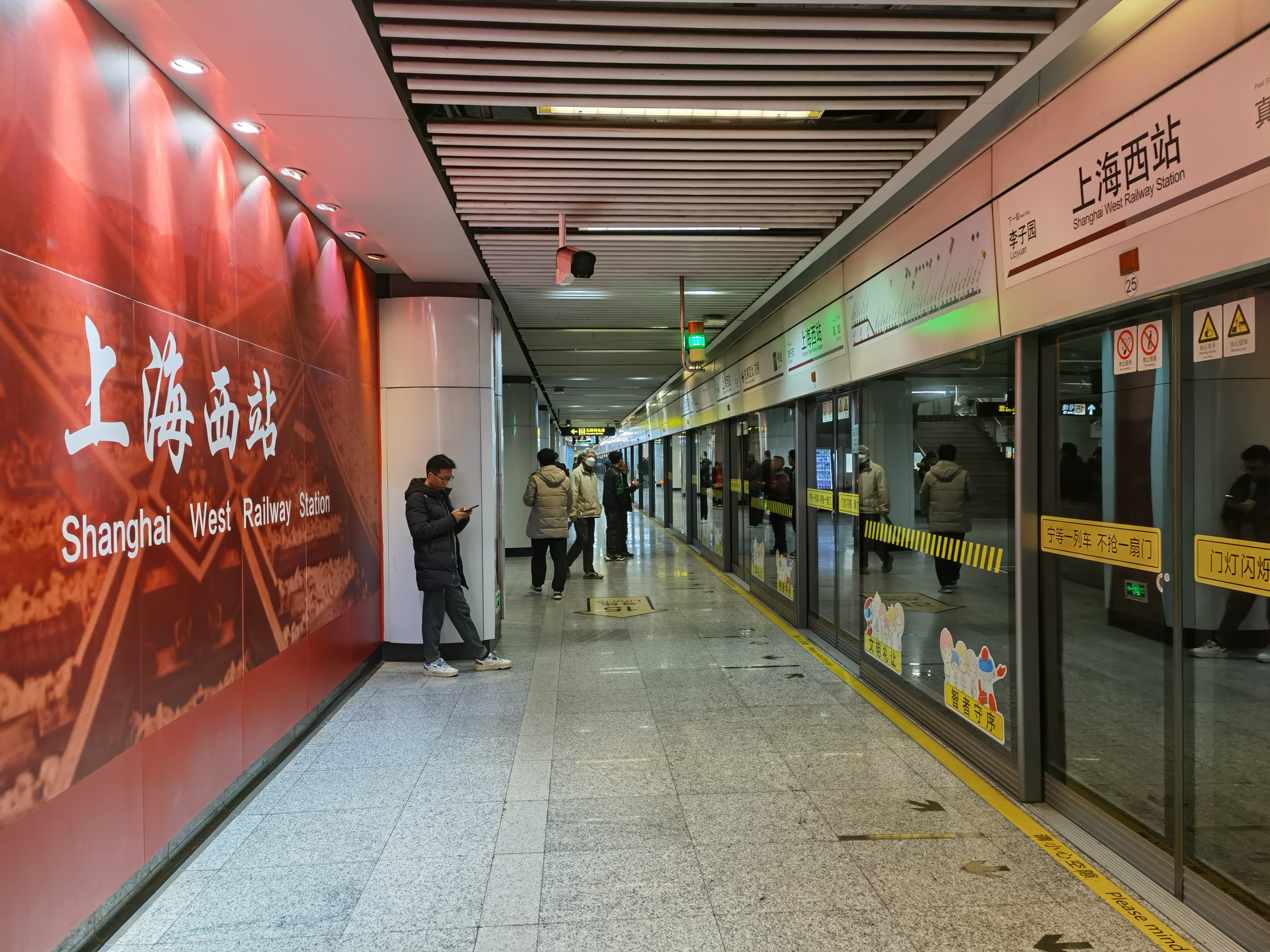
- Platform of Line 11

General information
- Location: Shanghai West railway station, Putuo District, Shanghai; China
- Coordinates: 31°15′53″N 121°23′46″E
- Operator: Shanghai No. 2 Metro Operation Co. Ltd.
- Lines: Line 11; Line 15
- Platforms: 4 (2 island platforms)
- Tracks: 4
- Connections: Shanghai West Railway station (SXH)

Construction
- Structure type: Underground
- Accessible: Yes

History
- Opened: 31 December 2009 (Line 11); 23 January 2021 (Line 15)
- Former names: West Shanghai Railway Station (2009-2020)

Services
Preceding station	Shanghai Metro	Following station
Liziyuan towards North Jiading or Huaqiao	Line 11	Zhenru towards Disney Resort
East Wuwei Road towards Gucun Park	Line 15	Tongchuan Road towards Zizhu Hi-tech Park
Jiaotong Road Terminus	Line 20 Future service	Zhenhua Road towards Beixinyuan Road
Location
- Location within Shanghai

Shanghai West Railway Station (Chinese: 上海西站; pinyin: Shànghǎi Xīzhàn), formerly known as West Shanghai Railway Station (2009-2020), is an interchange station between Line 11 and Line 15 of the Shanghai Metro. Located adjacent to the Shanghai West railway station in Shanghai's Putuo District, line 11 opened on 31 December 2009 and it became an interchange station with the opening of line 15 on 23 January 2021.

== Station layout ==
1F	Ground level	Exits
B1	Concourse	Tickets, Service Center
B2	Platform 1	← Line 11 towards North Jiading or Huaqiao (Liziyuan)
B2	Island platform, doors open on the left
B2	Platform 2	Line 11 towards Disney Resort (Zhenru) →
B3	Platform 4	← Line 15 towards Gucun Park (East Wuwei Road)
B3	Island platform, doors open on the left
B3	Platform 3	Line 15 towards Zizhu Hi-tech Park (Tongchuan Road) →

=== Entrances/exits ===
- 1: Taopu Road
- 2: Taopu Road
- 3: Taopu Road
- 4: Taopu Road
- 5: Taopu Road
- 6: Jiaotong Road, Shuiquan Road (S)
- 7: Jiaotong Road
- 8: Jiaotong Road
