= Gulang Road station =

Metro station in Shanghai

Gulang Road 古浪路
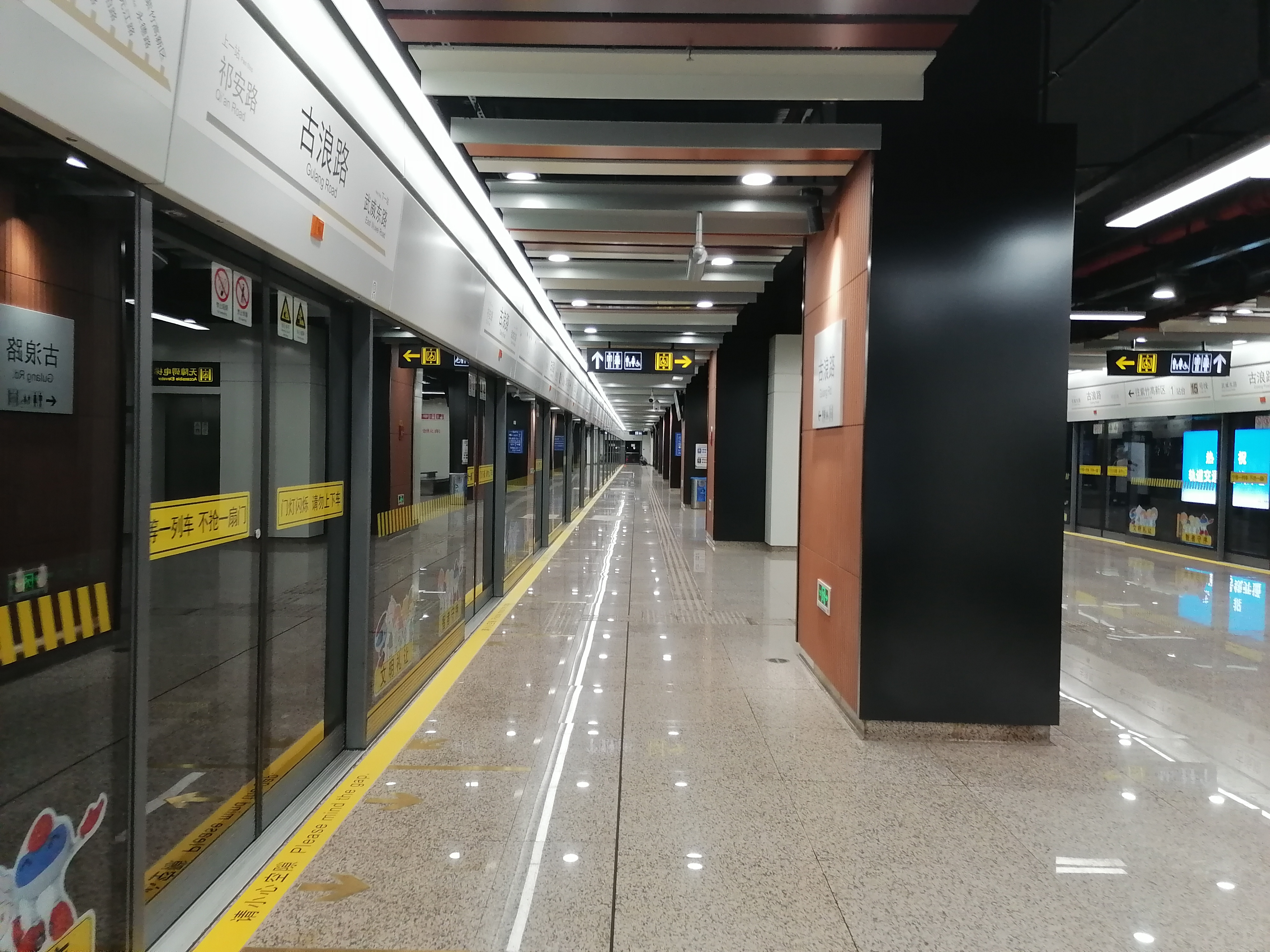
- Island Platform

General information
- Location: Gulang Road and West Taopu Road, Putuo District, Shanghai; China
- Coordinates: 31.2854°N 121.38743°E
- Line: Line 15
- Platforms: 3 (1 island platform and 1 side platform)
- Tracks: 3

Construction
- Structure type: Underground
- Accessible: Yes

History
- Opened: 23 January 2021

Services
Preceding station	Shanghai Metro	Following station
Qi'an Road towards Gucun Park	Line 15	East Wuwei Road towards Zizhu Hi-tech Park
Location

Gulang Road (Chinese: 古浪路; pinyin: Gǔlàng Lù) is a metro station on the Line 15 of the Shanghai Metro. Located at the intersection of Gulang Road and West Taopu Road in Putuo District, Shanghai, the station was scheduled to open with the rest of Line 15 by the end of 2020. However, the station eventually opened on 23 January 2021 following a one-month postponement. It is located in between Qi'an Road station to the north and East Wuwei Road station to the south. This station has 3 platforms, with the Island Platform heading to Zi-Zhu Hi-Tech Park and the Side Platform heading to Gucun Park.

== Station layout ==
G	Entrances and exits	Exits 1-6
B1	Concourse	Fare gates, station agent
B2	Side platform, doors open on the right
B2	Northbound	← Line 15 towards Gucun Park (Qi'an Road) ← Line 15 termination track
B2	Island platform, doors open on the left
B2	Southbound	Line 15 towards Zizhu Hi-tech Park (East Wuwei Road) →

== Gallery ==
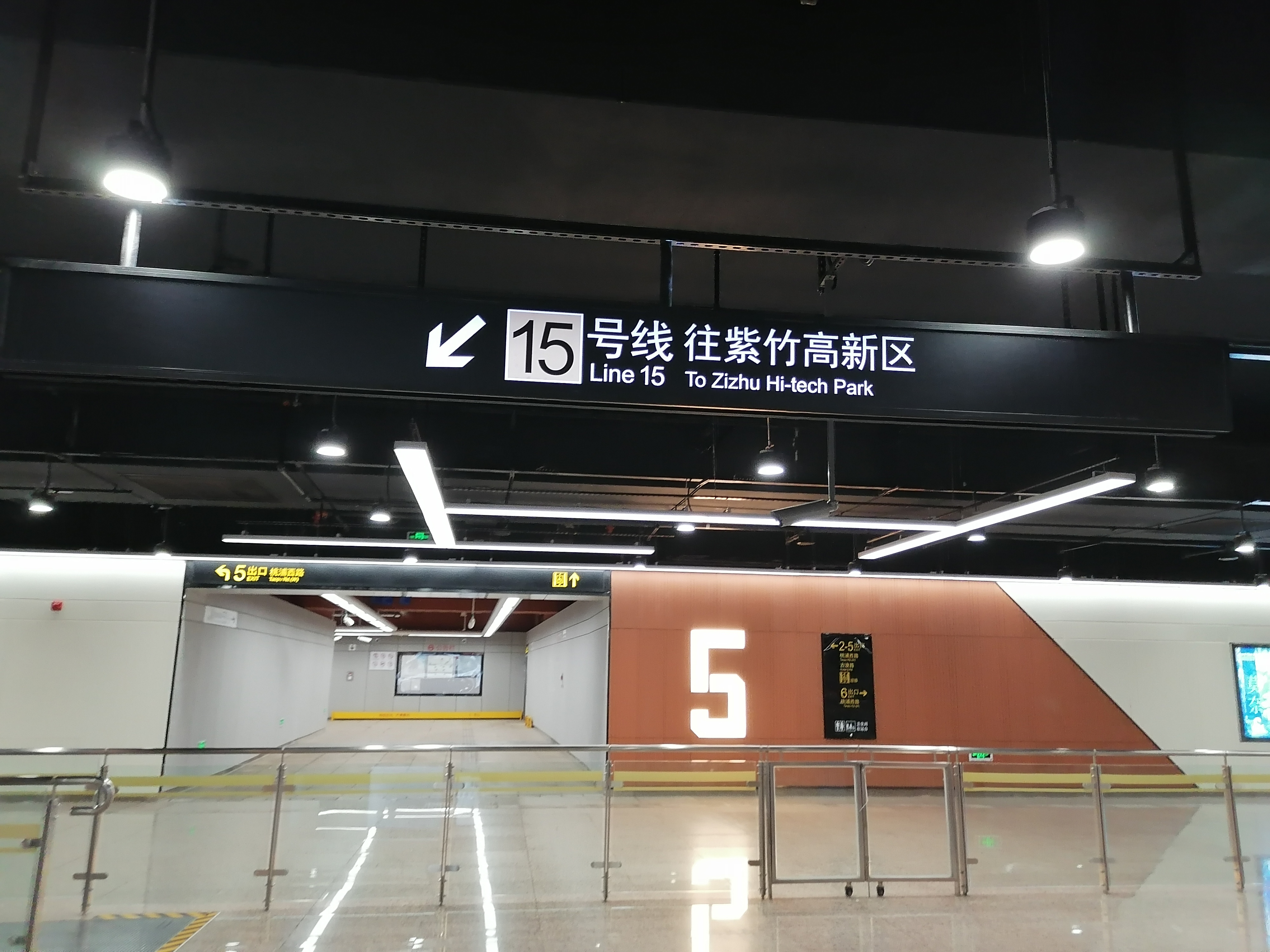
Concourse
