= Zhenru station =

Shanghai Metro station

Zhenru 真如
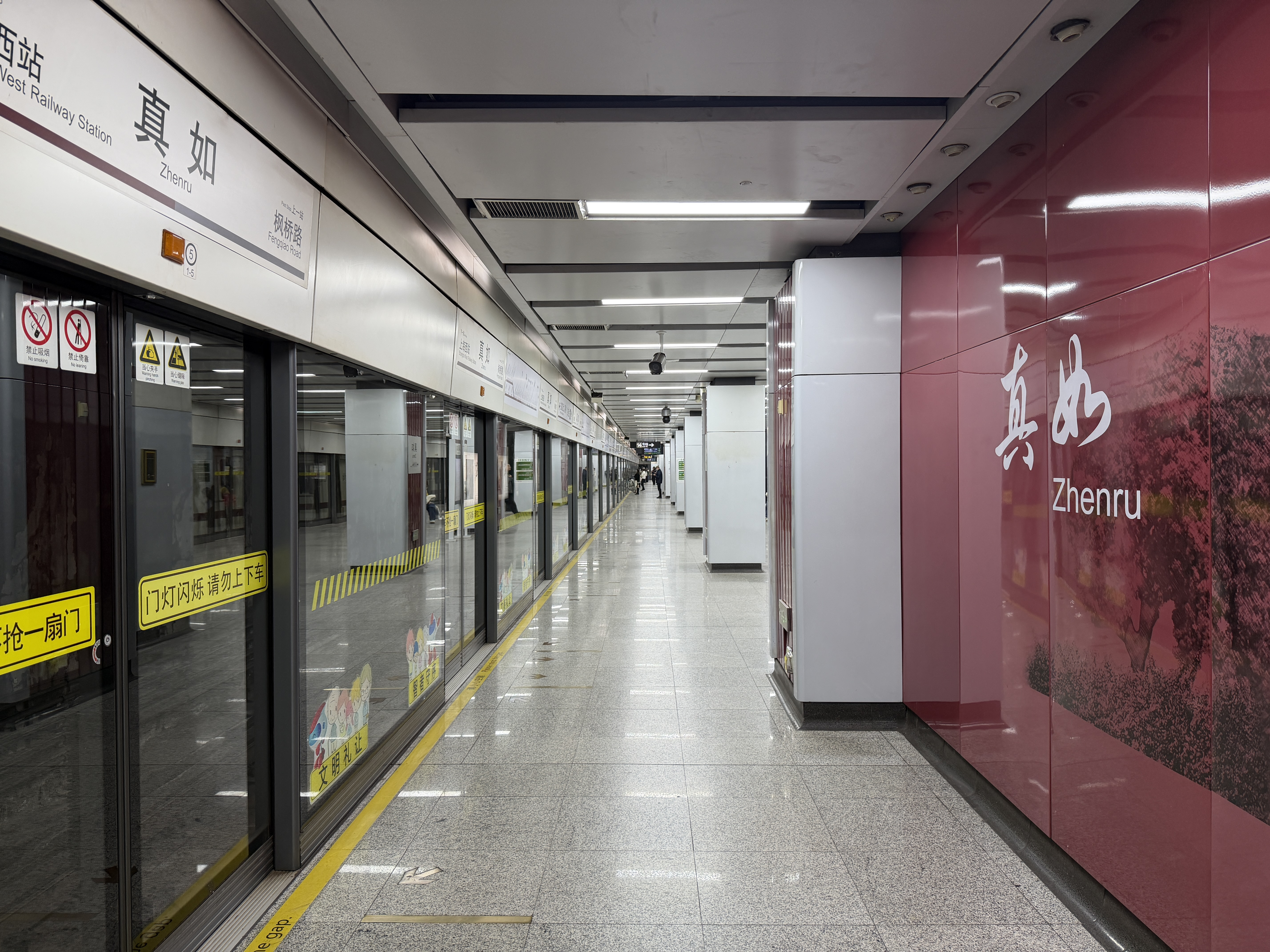
- Line 11 platform

General information
- Location: Caoyang Road and Tongchuan Road (铜川路); Zhenruzhen Subdistrict, Putuo District, Shanghai; China
- Coordinates: 31°15′10″N 121°24′09″E
- Operator: Shanghai No. 2 Metro Operation Co. Ltd.
- Lines: Line 11; Line 14
- Platforms: 5 (2 island platforms and 1 side platform)
- Tracks: 5

Construction
- Structure type: Underground
- Accessible: Yes

History
- Opened: 31 December 2009 (Line 11); 30 December 2021 (Line 14)

Services
| Preceding station | Shanghai Metro | Following station |
|---|---|---|
| Shanghai West Railway Station towards North Jiading or Huaqiao | Line 11 | Fengqiao Road towards Disney Resort |
| Tongchuan Road towards Fengbang | Line 14 | Zhongning Road towards Guiqiao Road |
Location
- Location within Shanghai

Zhenru (Chinese: 真如; pinyin: Zhēnrú) is a station on Line 11 and 14 on the Shanghai Metro. Line 11 opened on 31 December 2009. The station became an interchange station with the opening of Line 14, on 30 December 2021.

The station has 5 tracks, two island platforms, and one side platform. The inner island platform is not in service. Trains heading to either North Jiading or Huaqiao use the outer island platform, whilst trains towards Disney Resort use the side platform. This station utilizes the same platform layout as Nanxiang on the same line. The two platforms of Line 11 have interchange nodes with Line 14, and the node of the island platform also connects to the station hall of Line 14.

== Station layout ==
| 1F | Ground level | Exit 1 |
| B1 | Concourse | Exits 2, 5–7, Tickets, Service Center |
| B2 | Platform 1 | ← Line 11 towards North Jiading or Huaqiao (Shanghai West Railway Station) |
| B2 | Island platform, doors open on the left |
| B2 | | Not in service |
| B2 | Platform 3 | Line 11 towards Disney Resort (Fengqiao Road) → |
| B2 | Side platform, doors open on the right |
| B3 | Platform 4 | ← Line 14 towards Fengbang (Tongchuan Road) |
| B3 | Island platform, doors open on the left |
| B3 | Platform 5 | Line 14 towards Guiqiao Road (Zhongning Road) → |

=== Entrances/exits ===
- 1: Tongchuan Road
- 2: Caoyang Road, Shopping Mall
- 5: Tongchuan Road, Caoyang Road
- 6: Tongchuan Road
- 7: Tongchuan Road

== Gallery ==
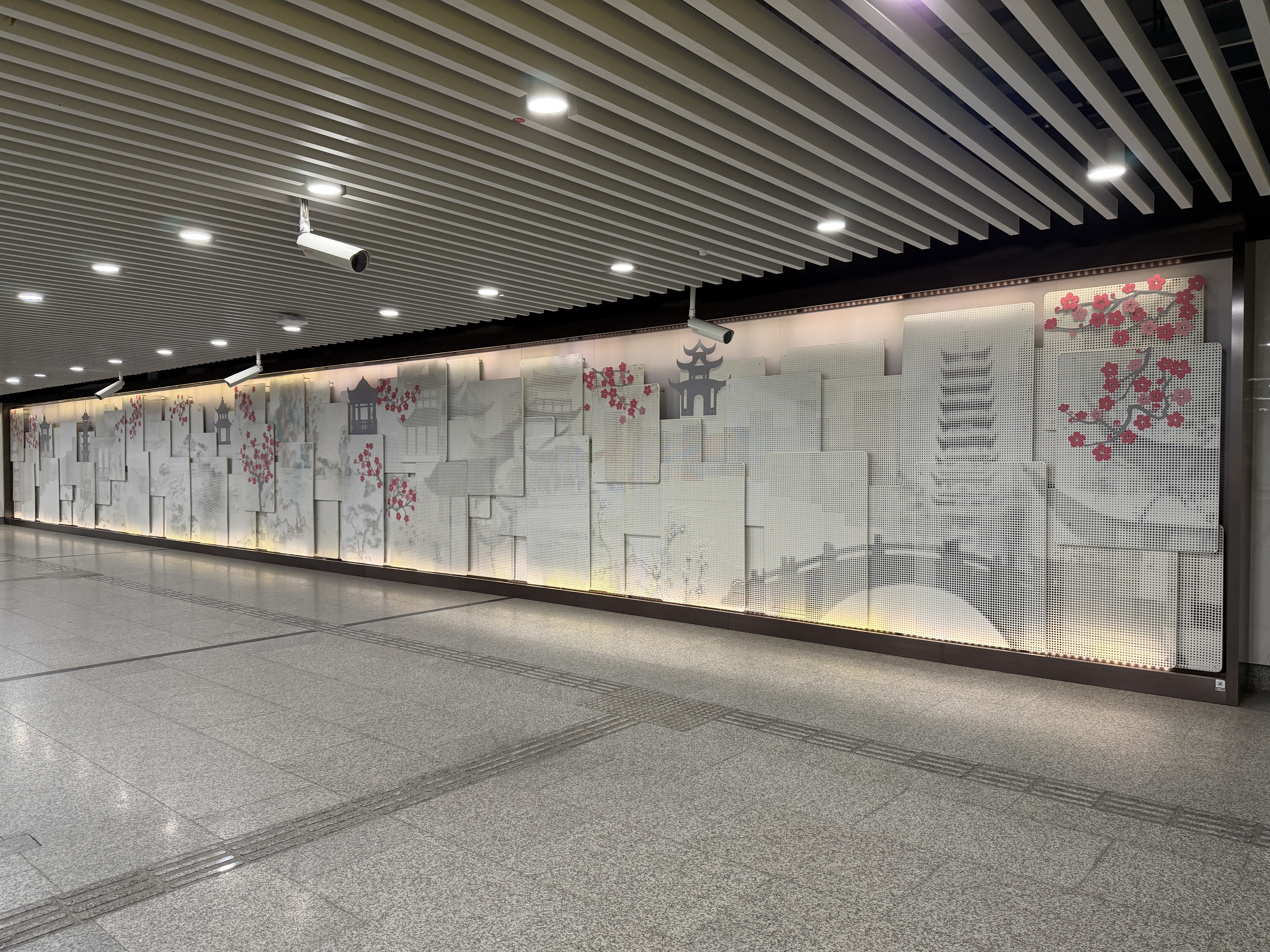
Art wall

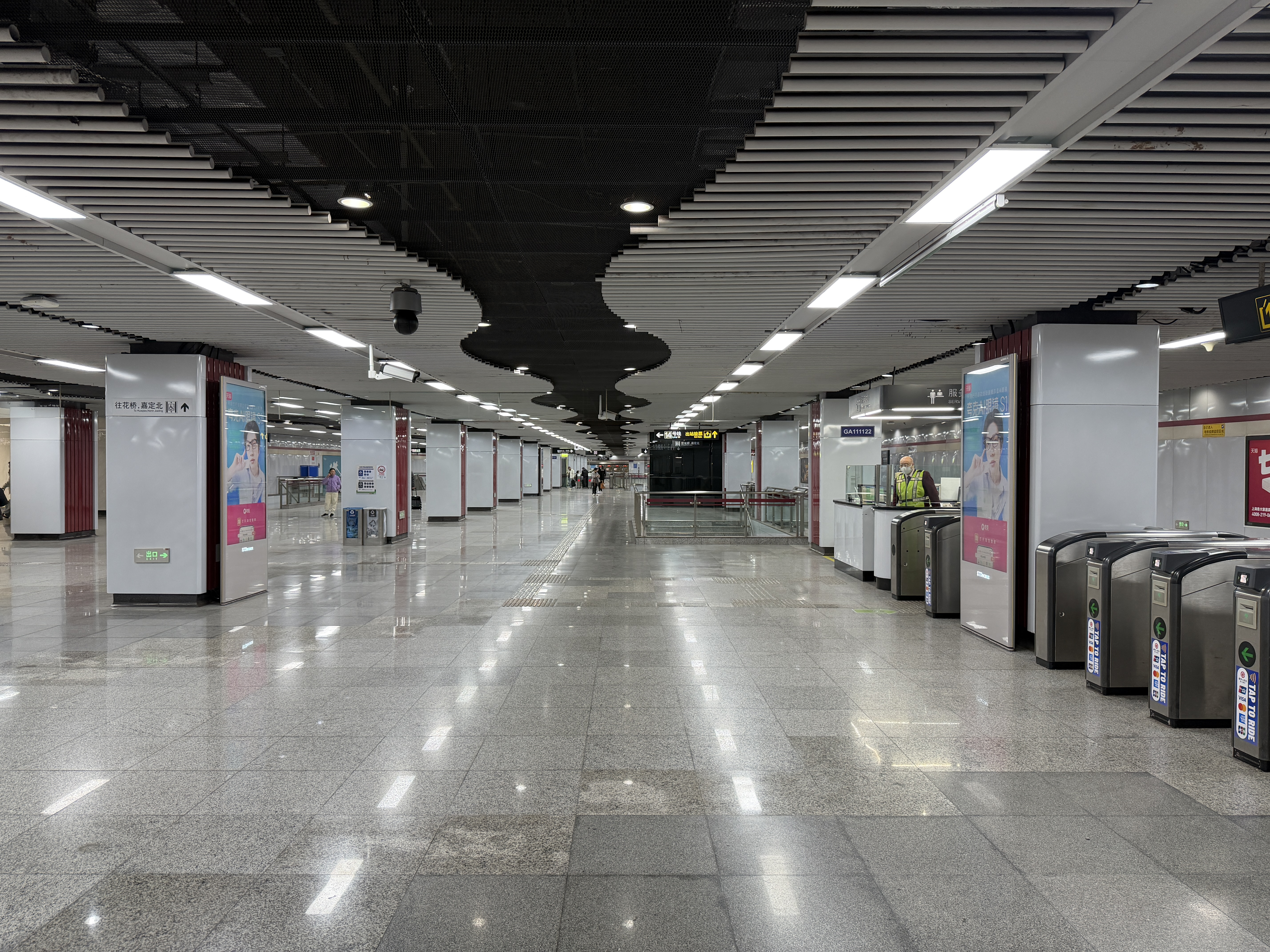
Line 11 concourse

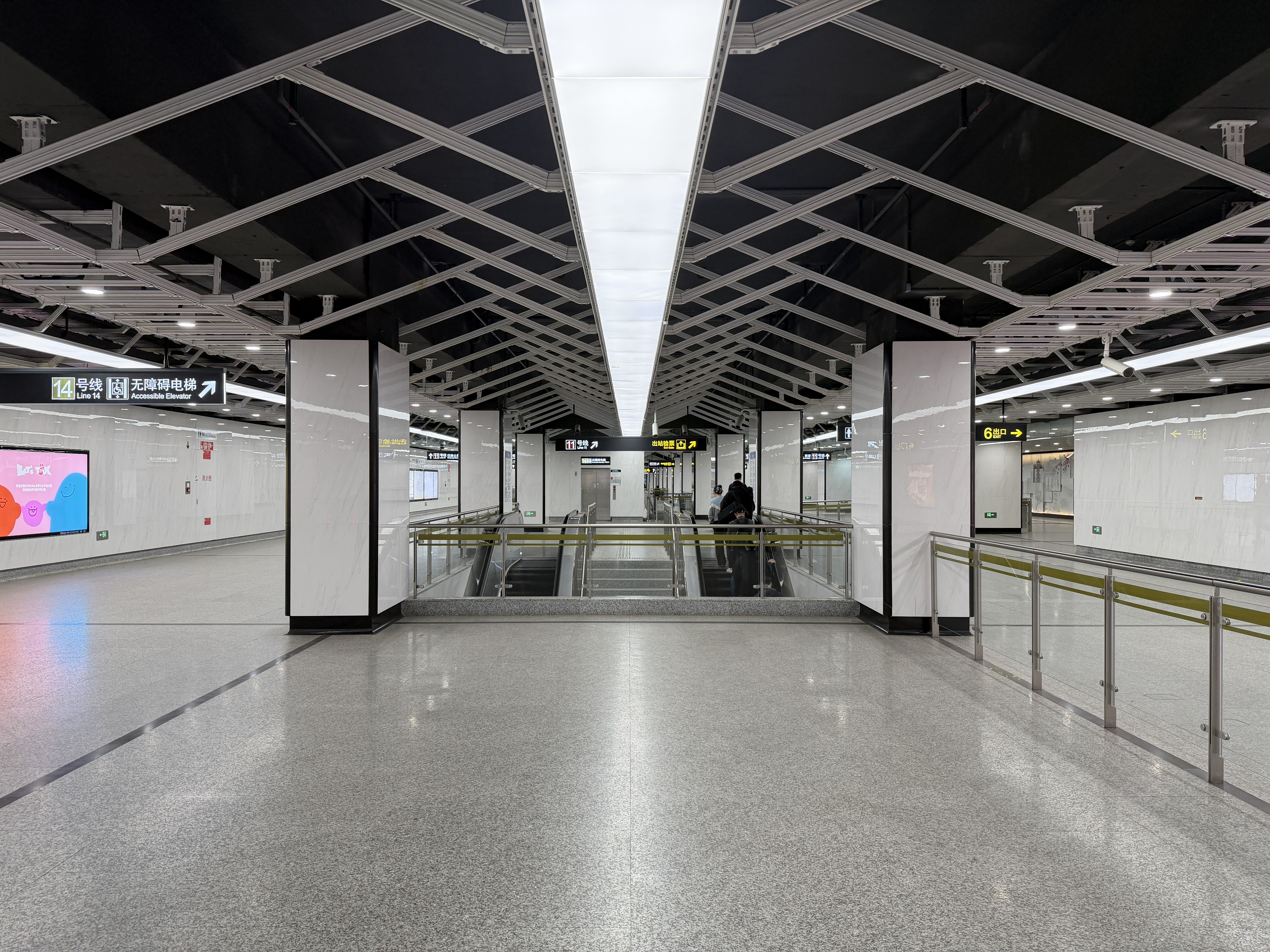
Line 14 concourse

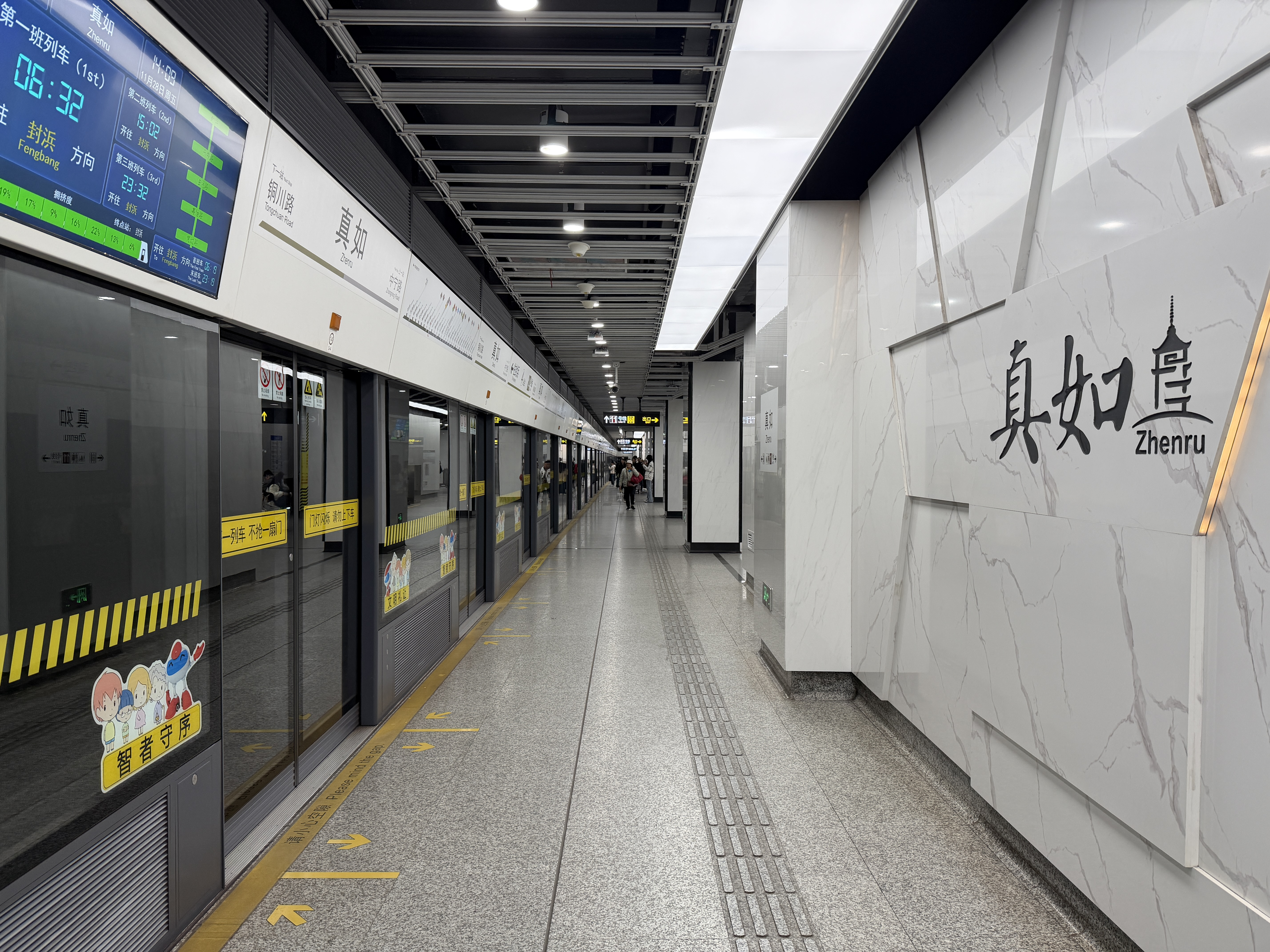
Line 14 platform
