= Zhenguang Road station =

Metro station in Shanghai, China

Zhenguang Road 真光路
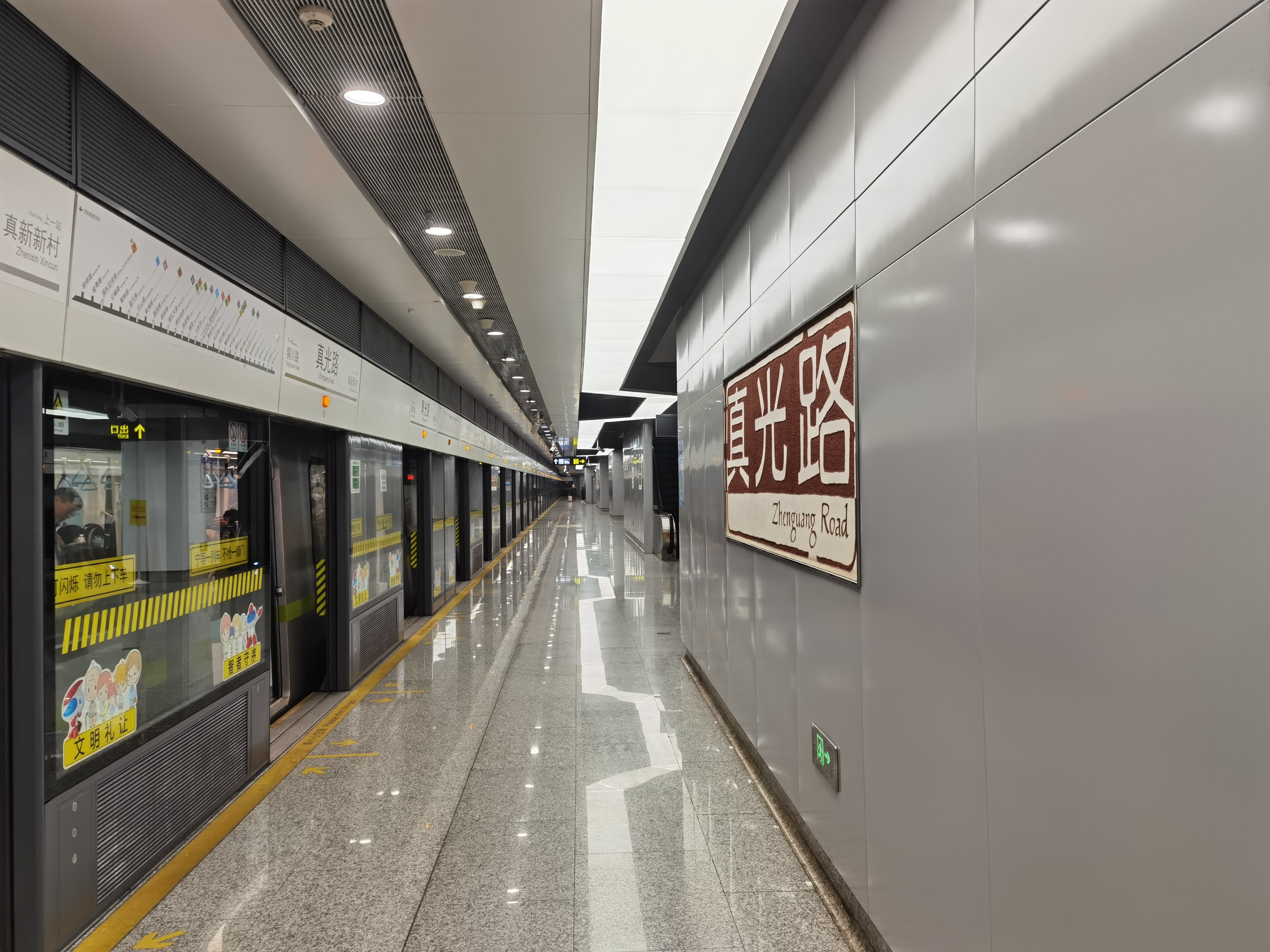

General information
- Location: Zhenguang Road and Tongchuan Road, Putuo District, Shanghai; China
- Coordinates: 31.255082°N 121.379835°E
- Line: Line 14
- Platforms: 2 (1 island platform)
- Tracks: 2

Construction
- Structure type: Underground
- Accessible: Yes

History
- Opened: 30 December 2021

Services
Preceding station	Shanghai Metro	Following station
Zhenxin Xincun towards Fengbang	Line 14	Tongchuan Road towards Guiqiao Road
Location

Zhenguang Road (Chinese: 真光路) is a station that is part of Line 14 of the Shanghai Metro. Located at the intersection of Zhenguang Road and Tongchuan Road in the city's Putuo District, the station opened with the rest of Line 14 on December 30, 2021.
