= He Hong =

Chinese engineer

- 贺泓
- Born: 15 January 1965 (age 61); Handan, Hebei, China
- Education: Hebei Normal University; University of Tokyo
- Scientific career
- Fields: Air pollution control
- Workplaces: Research Center for Eco-Environmental Sciences, Chinese Academy of Sciences; Institute of Urban Environment, Chinese Academy of Sciences

Chinese name
- Simplified Chinese: 贺泓
- Traditional Chinese: 賀泓
Transcriptions
Standard Mandarin
- Hanyu Pinyin: Hè Hóng

He Hong (born 15 January 1965) is a Chinese engineer who is a researcher at the Chinese Academy of Sciences's Research Center for Eco-Environmental Sciences and deputy director of Institute of Urban Environment, and an academician of the Chinese Academy of Engineering.

== Biography ==
He was born in Handan, Hebei, on 15 January 1965. He enrolled at Hebei Normal University where he received his BSc degree in 1985 and his MSc degree in 1988. In 1990, he pursued advanced studies in Japan on government scholarships, earning his DSc degree from the University of Tokyo in 1994. In 1994, he became a postdoctoral fellow at the University of Southern California. In 2000, he became a senior researcher at the University of Toronto.

He returned to China at the end of 2000 and became a researcher at Chinese Academy of Sciences (CAS). He was honored as a Distinguished Young Scholar by the National Science Fund for Distinguished Young Scholars in 2004. In December 2015, he was appointed deputy director of CAS's Institute of Urban Environment. In January 2018, he became a delegate to the 13th National People's Congress.

== Honours and awards ==
- 2011 State Technological Invention Award (Second Class)
- 2014 State Science and Technology Progress Award (Second Class)
- October 2017 Science and Technology Innovation Award of the Ho Leung Ho Lee Foundation
- 27 November 2017 Member of the Chinese Academy of Engineering (CAE)
