= Fengqiao Road station =

Shanghai Metro station

Coordinates: 31°14′31″N 121°24′41″E

Fengqiao Road 枫桥路
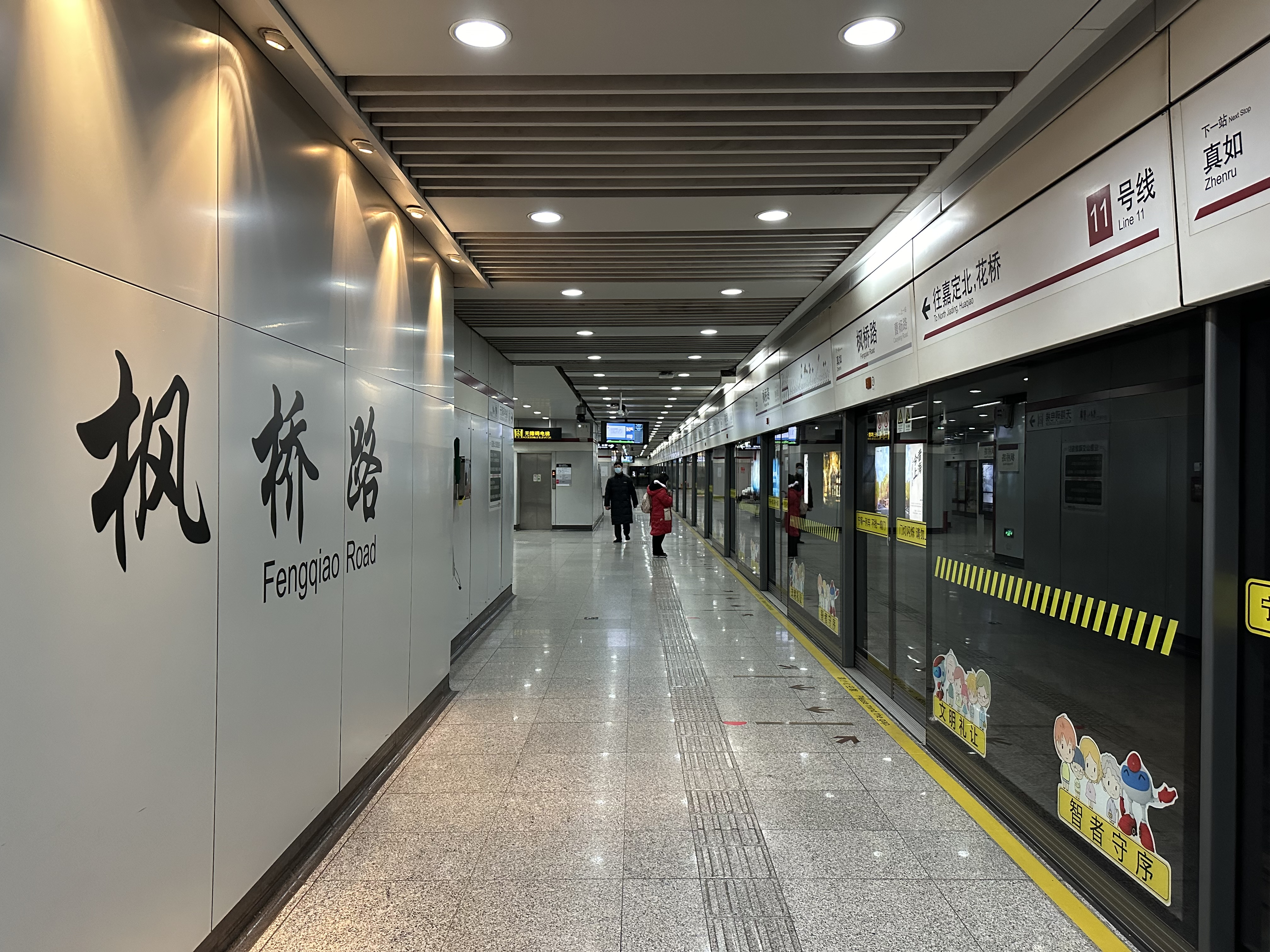
- Station platform

General information
- Location: Caoyang Road and Fengqiao Road (枫桥路); Zhenruzhen Subdistrict, Putuo District, Shanghai; China
- Operator: Shanghai No. 2 Metro Operation Co. Ltd.
- Line: Line 11
- Platforms: 2 (1 island platform)
- Tracks: 2

Construction
- Structure type: Underground
- Accessible: Yes

History
- Opened: 31 December 2009

Services
Preceding station	Shanghai Metro	Following station
Zhenru towards North Jiading or Huaqiao	Line 11	Caoyang Road towards Disney Resort
Location
- Location within Shanghai

Fengqiao Road (simplified Chinese: 枫桥路; traditional Chinese: 楓橋路; pinyin: Fēngqiáo Lù) is the name of a station on Line 11 on the Shanghai Metro. It opened on December 31, 2009.
