= Putuo, Shanghai =

Coordinates: 31.2553°N 121.396°E

Putuo 普陀区; 普陀區
- District
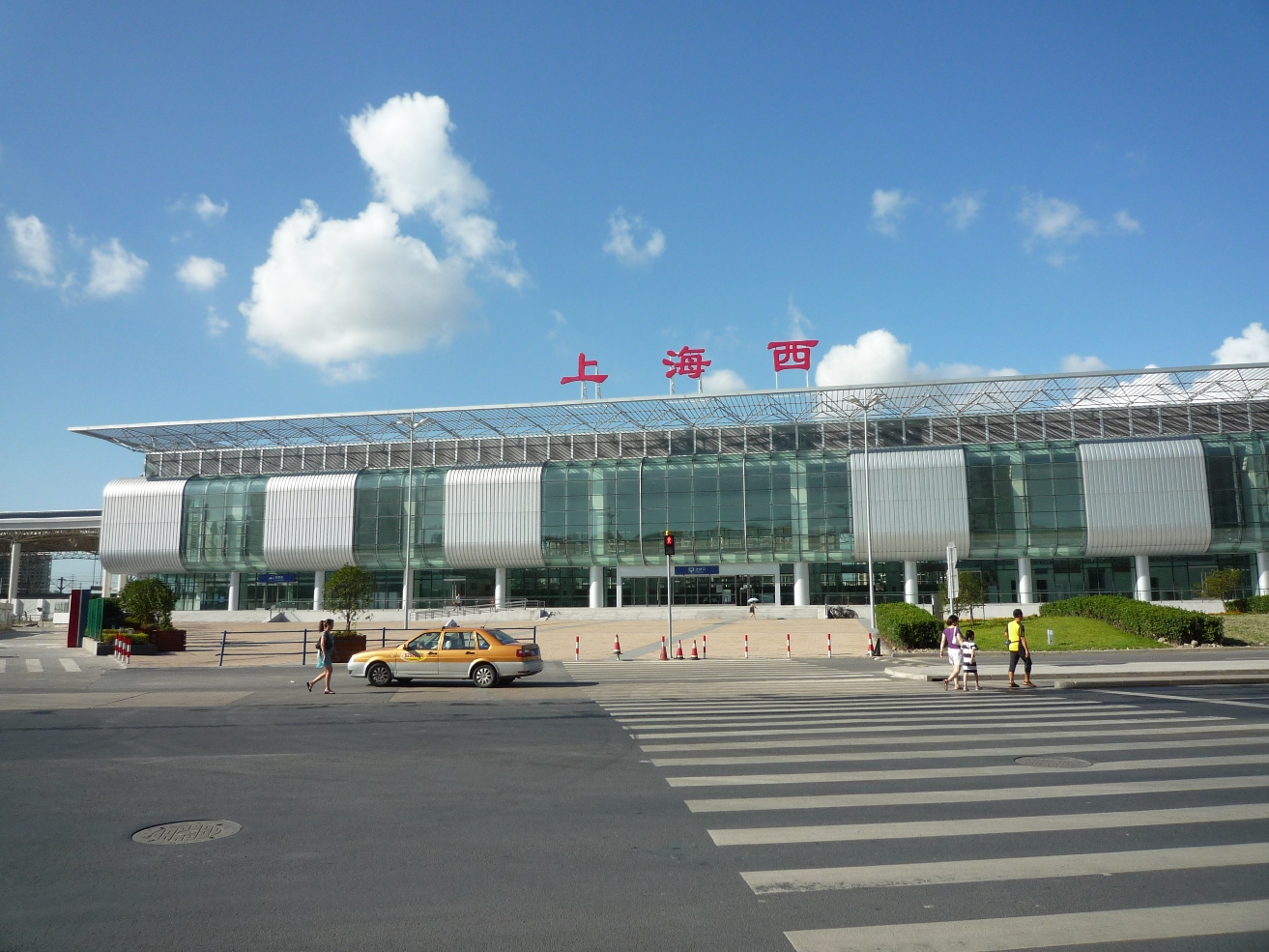
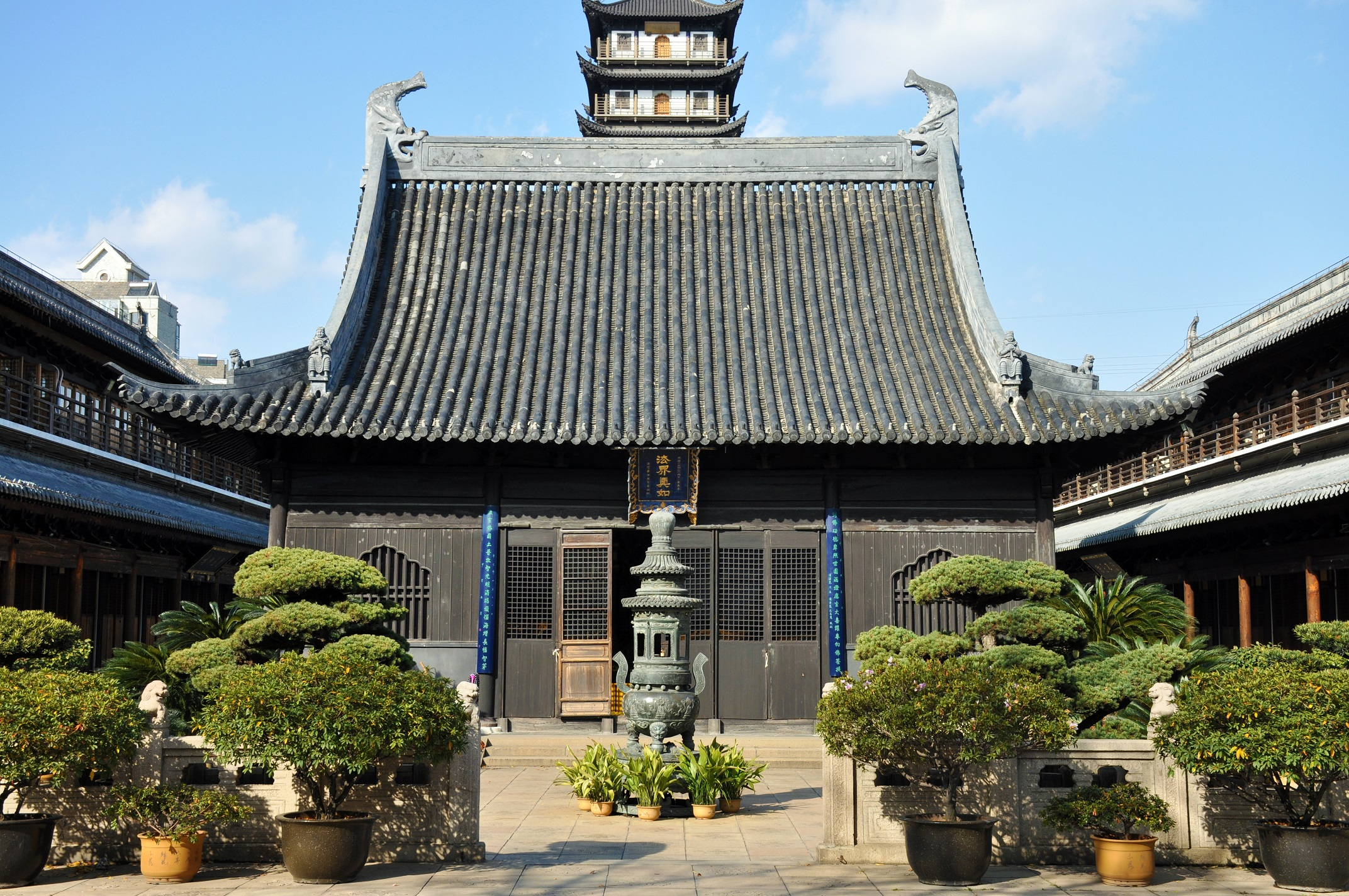
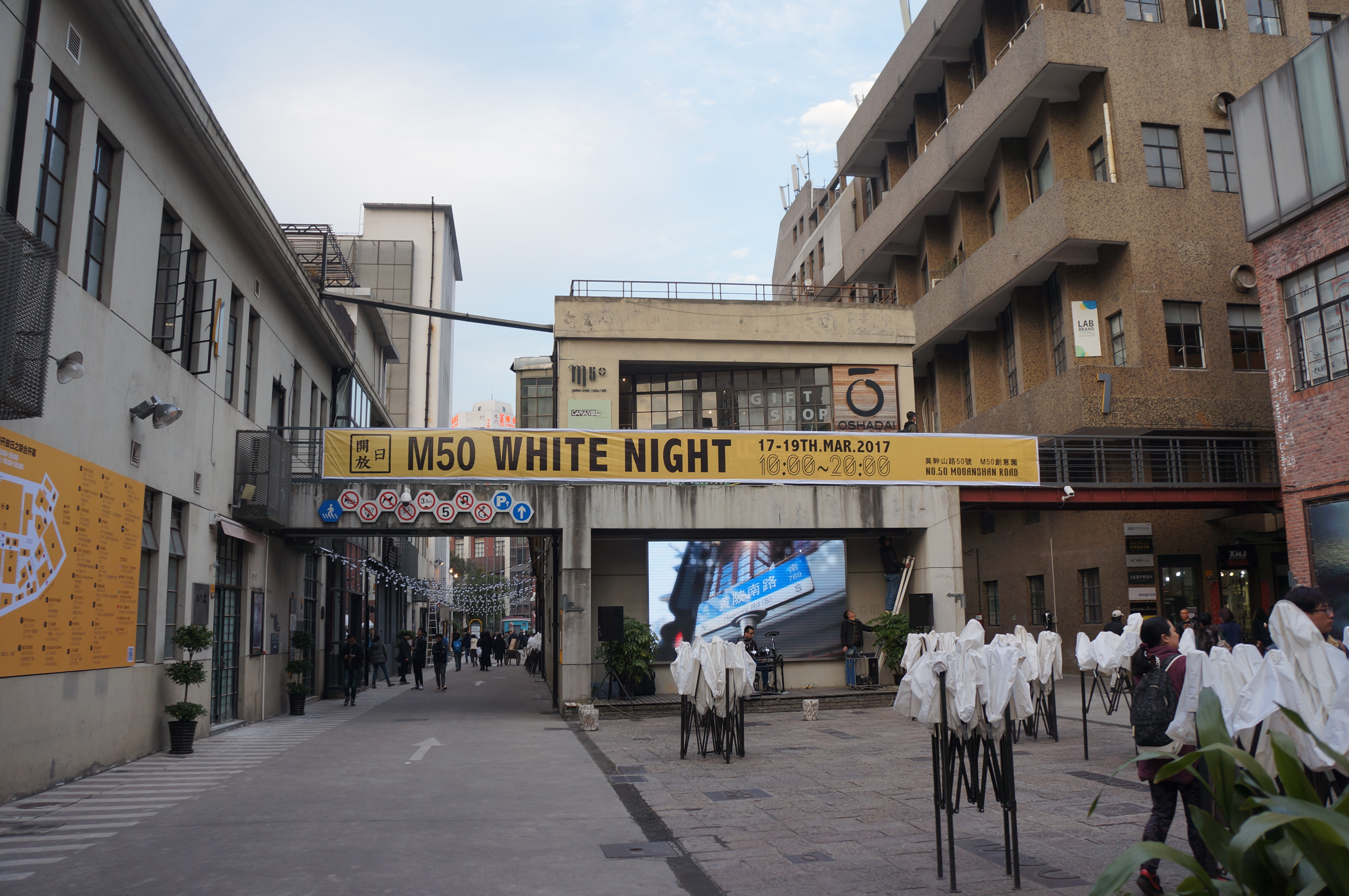
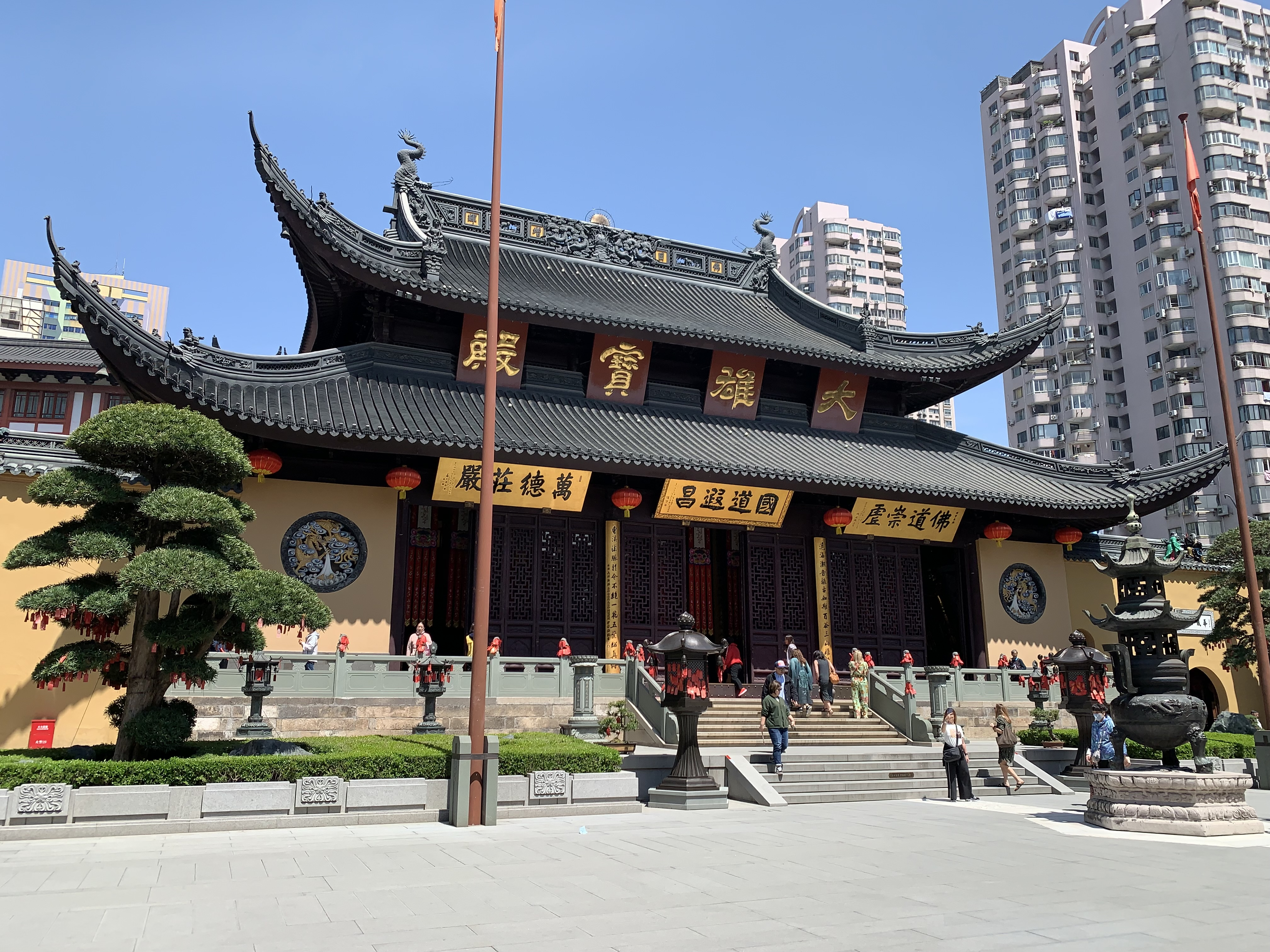
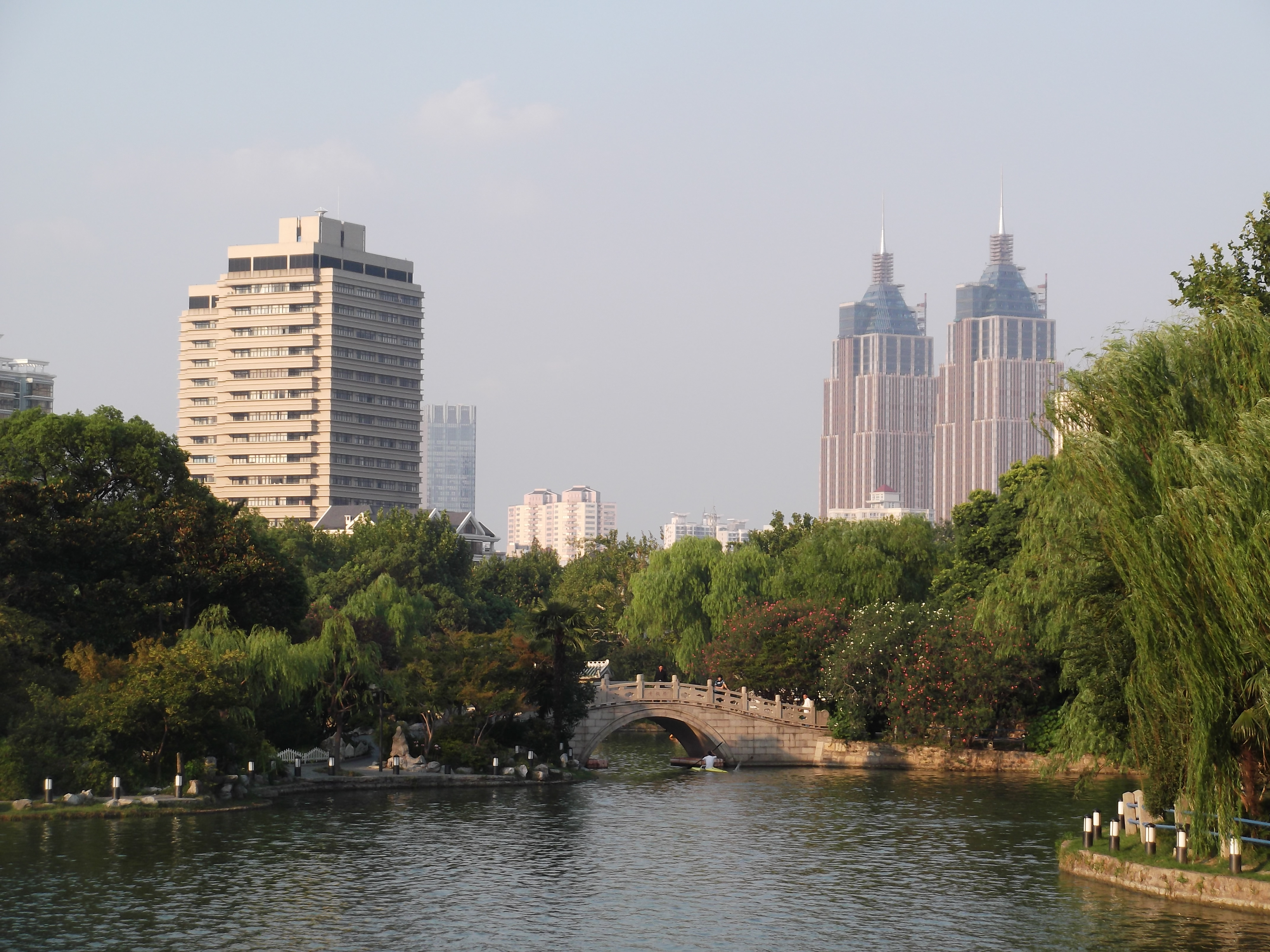
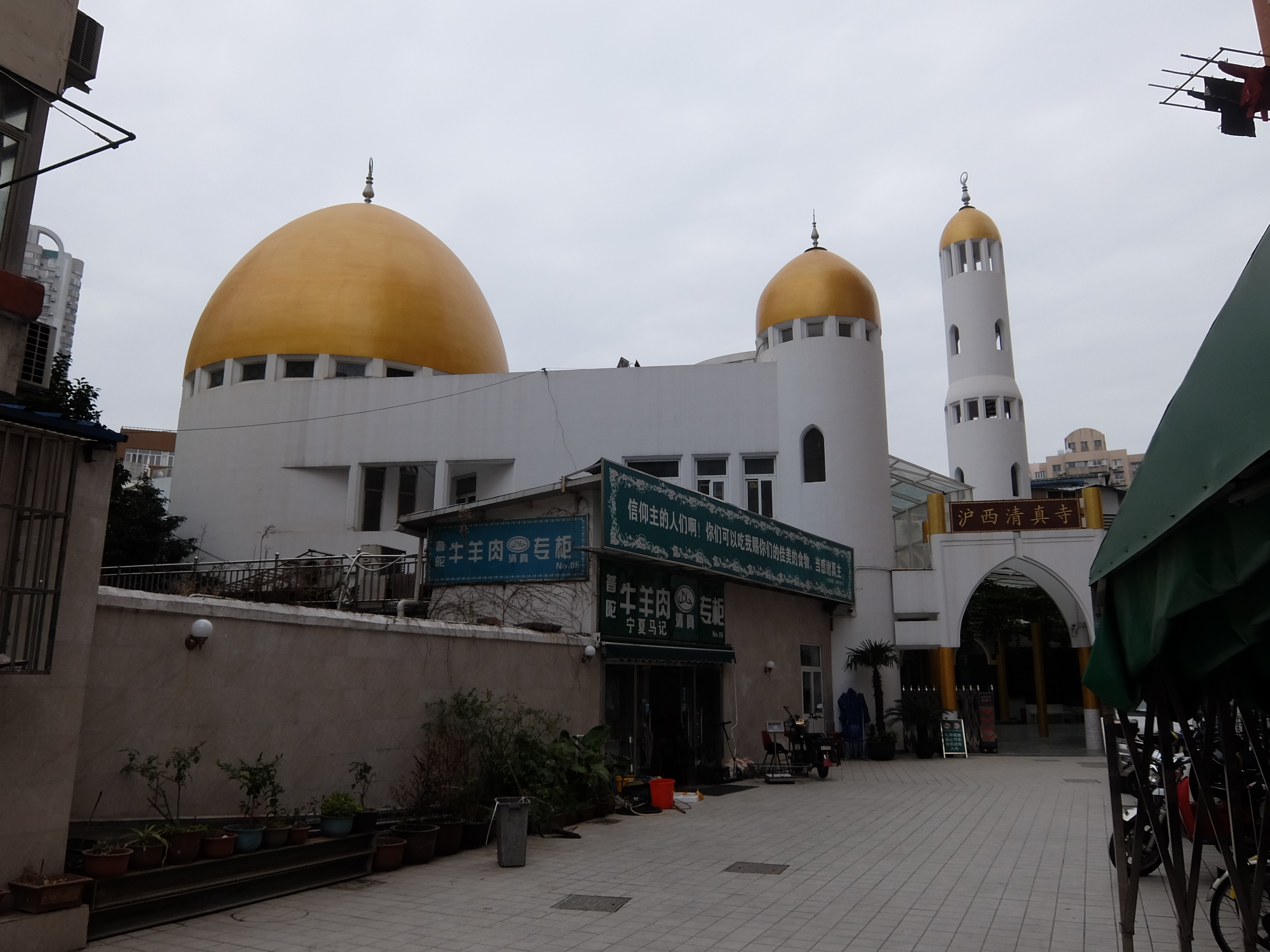
- Shanghai West Railway Station Zhenru Temple M50 Ceative Park Jade Buddha Temple Changfeng Park Huxi Mosque

- Putuo in Shanghai
- Country: People's Republic of China
- Municipality: Shanghai

Area
  - Total: 55.47 km^{2} (21.42 sq mi)

Population (2020 Census)
  - Total: 1,239,800
  - Density: 22,350/km^{2} (57,890/sq mi)
- Time zone: UTC+8 (China Standard)
- Postal code: 200060
- Website: www.ptq.sh.gov.cn

Putuo District
- Simplified Chinese: 普陀区
- Traditional Chinese: 普陀區
Transcriptions
Standard Mandarin
- Hanyu Pinyin: Pǔtuó Qū
Wu
- Wugniu: phu^{3} du^{2} chiu^{1}
- IPA: Shanghainese: [pʰu˧ du˦ tɕʰy˨]
Yue: Cantonese
- Jyutping: pou^{2} to^{4} keoi^{1}

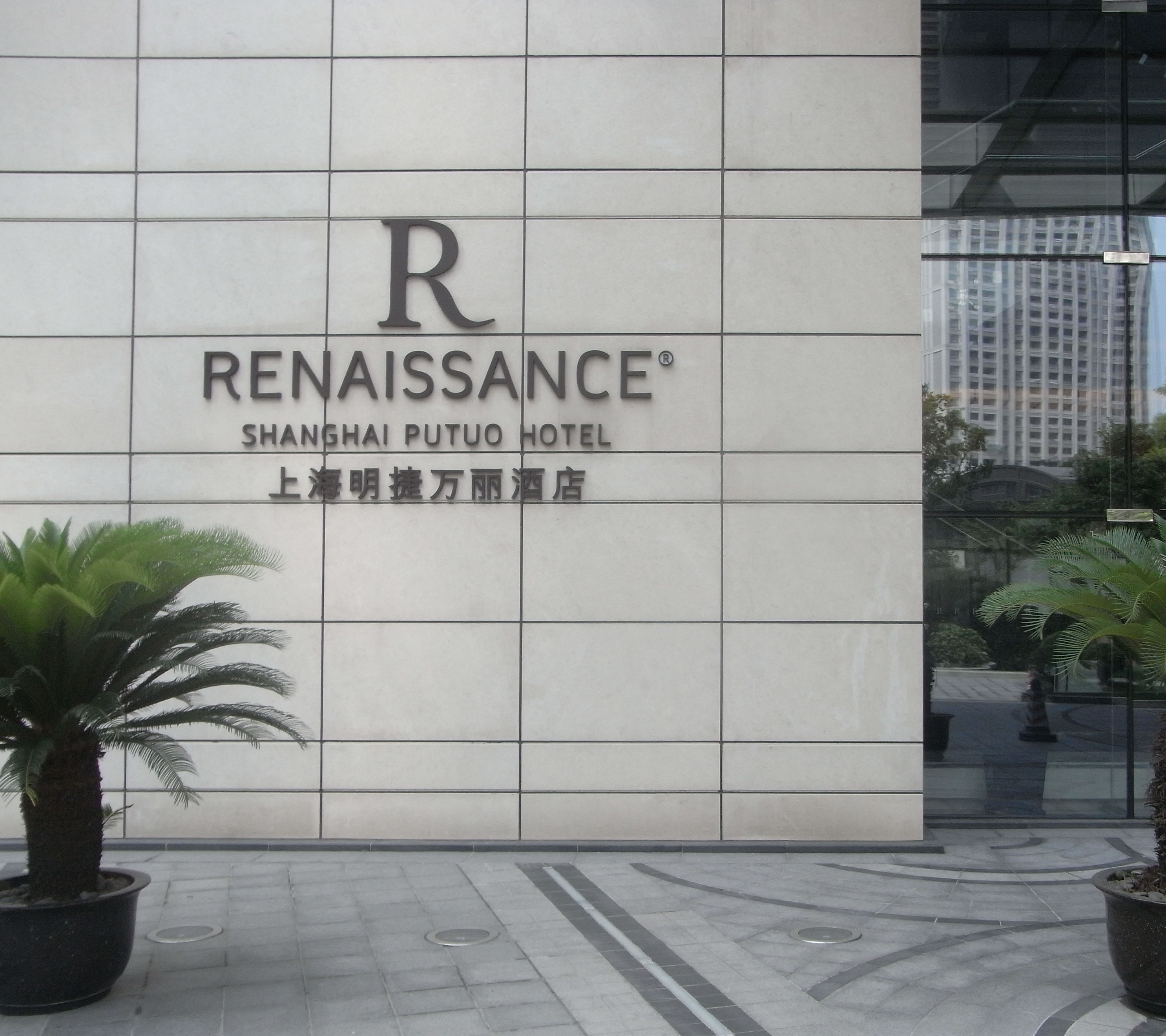
Renaissance Shanghai Putuo Hotel sign.

Putuo District (simplified Chinese: 普陀区; traditional Chinese: 普陀區; pinyin: Pǔtuó Qū; Shanghainese: phu^{3} du^{2} chiu^{1}) is a municipal district of Shanghai Municipality, People's Republic of China. It covers an area of 54.83 km^{2} (21.17 sq mi). Putuo District borders Baoshan District to the north, Jing'an District to the east and south east, Changning District to the south west and Jiading District to the west.

== Overview ==
The name of Putuo District comes from Putuo Road, located within the district. Suzhou Creek crosses the Putuo District and makes up the eastern boundary of the area, shared by Jing'an District. The Shanghai Putuo District People's Government is located on Daduhe Road.

The Zhenru Temple, Jade Buddha Temple, and Changfeng Park are located in the district. The Shanghai West Railway Station is in Putuo District. East China Normal University has a Putuo campus.

== Administrative divisions ==
Putuo District has eight subdistricts and two townships. Below is a list of subdistricts and towns in Putuo District.

Name	Chinese	Hanyu Pinyin	Shanghainese Romanization	Population (2010)	Area (km^{2})
Caoyang Xincun Subdistrict	曹杨新村街道	Cáoyáng Xīncūn Jiēdào	dzo yan sin tsen ka do	98,267	1.36
Changfeng Xincun Subdistrict	长风新村街道	Chángfēng Xīncūn Jiēdào	tzan fon sin tsen ka do	120,920	5.80
Changshou Road Subdistrict	长寿路街道	Chángshòulù Jiēdào	tzan zoe lu ka do	128,647	3.98
Ganquan Road Subdistrict	甘泉路街道	Gānquánlù Jiēdào	keu dzi lu ka do	112,498	2.34
Shiquan Road Subdistrict	石泉路街道	Shíquánlù Jiēdào	zaq dzi lu ka do	120,217	3.48
Yichuan Road Subdistrict	宜川路街道	Yíchuānlù Jiēdào	gnij tseu lu ka do	111,185	2.22
Zhenruzhen Subdistrict	真如镇街道	Zhēnrúzhèn Jiēdào	tzen zyu tzen ka do	172,397	6.09
Wanli Subdistrict	万里街道	Wànlǐ Jiēdào	ve lij ka do	229,925	3.30
Changzheng town	长征镇	Chángzhēng Zhèn	tzan tzen tzen	229,925	7.67
Taopu town	桃浦镇	Táopǔ Zhèn	do phu tzen	194,800	18.83

== Economy ==
O.C.T. Mami, a Chinese maternity wear brand, has its headquarters in the district.

Lianhua Supermarket has its Shanghai office in the district.

== Population ==
In 2009, the region's total registered population was 872,600. The natural growth rate of households was -1.99‰. At the end of 2009, there was a resident population of 1,135,900. The Putuo district is home to populations representing 44 minorities, the largest of whom are Chinese Muslims from the country's northwest. They account for a total minority population of 70%.

== Education ==
In 2014, 100% of children residing in Putuo District are enrolled in compulsory education, and 97.88% are enrolled in high schools.

There are 25 mainstream primary schools, with 34,143 students enrolled, 47 mainstream high schools with 27,542 students enrolled, 77 nurseries and kindergartens with 27,382 student enrolled, 1 vocational school with 1529 students enrolled, 2 special education schools with 429 students enrolled and 1 work-study school with 13 students enrolled.

=== Primary schools ===
==== Public ====
- Shanghai Putuo District Changzheng Central Primary School
- Shanghai Putuo District New Putuo Primary School
- Shanghai Putuo District Caoyang Experimental Primary School
- Shanghai Putuo District Zhenruwenying Central Primary School
- Shanghai Putuo District Yangjia Bridge Primary School
- Shanghai Putuo District Zhenru Primary School No. 3
- Shanghai Putuo District Zhenguang Primary School
- Shanghai Putuo District Lianjian Primary School
- Shanghai Putuo District Shude Primary School
- Shanghai Putuo District Hengde Primary School
- Shanghai Putuo District Taopu Central Primary School
- Shanghai Putuo District Hui People Primary School
- Shanghai Putuo District Wuning Road Primary School
- Shanghai Putuo District Lujiazhai Primary School
- Shanghai Putuo District North Zhongshan Road Primary School No. 1
- Shanghai Putuo District Xunyang Road Primary School
- Shanghai Putuo District Guanlongxincun Primary School
- Shanghai Putuo District Pingli Road Primary School No. 1
- Shanghai Putuo District Hutaixincun Primary School No. 1
- Shanghai Putuo District Huayin Primary School
- Shanghai Putuo District Chaochun Central Primary School
- Shanghai Putuo District Caoyangxincun Primary School No. 6
- East China Normal University Primary School
- Shanghai Putuo District Jinshajiang Road Primary School

==== Private ====
- Shanghai Jinzhou Primary School

=== Middle schools ===
- Shanghai Wuning Middle School
- Shanghai Huayin Middle School
- Shanghai Beihai Middle School
- Shanghai Yanhe Middle School
- Shanghai Xinglong Middle School
- Shanghai Nujiang Middle School
- East China Normal University Affiliated High School No. 4
- Shanghai Normal University Affiliated Experimental School No. 2
- Shanghai Zhenbei High School
- Shanghai Putuo District Education Department Affiliated High School
- Shanghai Xinyang High School
- Shanghai Meilong Middle School
- Shanghai Lantian High School
- Shanghai Yuhua High School
- Shanghai Luochuan School
- Shanghai Caoyang Affiliated Middle School No. 2
- Shanghai Jinyuan Affiliated Advanced High School
- Shanghai Yichuan Affiliated Middle School
- Shanghai Putuo District Affiliated Middle School
- Shanghai Caoyang Affiliated Middle School
- Shanghai Jiangning School
- Shanghai Guangxin School
- Shanghai Tongchuan School
- Shanghai Shatian School
- East China Normal University Affiliated Foreign Languages Experimental School
- Shanghai Zizhang Middle School
- Shanghai Zhongyuan Experimental School
- Shanghai Wanlicheng Experimental School
- Shanghai International Studies University Shangyang Foreign Languages School
- Shanghai Wenda School
- Shanghai New Huangpu Experimental School
- Shanghai Jinding School
- Shanghai Conservatory of Music Affiliated Anshun Experimental Middle School
- Shanghai Taopu School
- Shanghai Caoyang Middle School No. 9
- Shanghai Caoyang Middle School
- Tongji University Affiliated Middle School No. 2
- Shanghai Ganquan Foreign Languages Middle School
- Shanghai Changzheng Middle School
- Shanghai Jinhua Private Middle School
- Shanghai Peijia Bilingual School
- Shanghai Caoyang Middle School No. 2
- Shanghai Jinyuan Advanced School
- Shanghai Yichuan Middle School
- Shanghai Zhenru Middle School
- Shanghai Tongbai Advanced Middle School
- Shanghai Chengzheng Secondary School
  - It was established in 1965.

=== Higher education ===
- East China Normal University (North Zhongshan Road Campus)
- Tonji University (Huxi Campus)
- Shanghai University of Engineering Science (Xincun Road Campus)

=== Special education ===
- Shanghai Putuo District Qixing School
- Shanghai Chengyuan Middle School
- Shanghai Putuo District Ganlin Primary Technology Vocational School

== Transportation ==
=== Train ===
==== Shanghai Railway Bureau ====
The Shanghai West Railway Station operated by the Shanghai Railway Bureau is located within Putuo District. The station serves the:

- Shanghai-Nanjing Intercity High-Speed Railway, and the;
- Beijing-Shanghai Railway.

==== Shanghai Metro ====
Putuo District is currently served by seven metro lines operated by Shanghai Metro:

- Line 3 and Line 4 - Jinshajiang Road 13 , Caoyang Road 11 14 , Zhenping Road 7 , Zhongtan Road
- Line 7 - Xincun Road, Langao Road, Zhenping Road 3 4 , Changshou Road 13
- Line 11 - Longde Road 13 , Caoyang Road 3 4 , Fengqiao Road, Zhenru 14 , Shanghai West Railway Station 15 , Liziyuan, Qilianshan Road, Wuwei Road, Taopu Xincun
- Line 13 - South Qilianshan Road, Zhenbei Road, Daduhe Road 15 , Jinshajiang Road 3 4 , Longde Road 11 , Wuning Road 14 , Changshou Road 7 , Jiangning Road.
- Line 14 - Zhenguang Road, Tongchuan Road 15 , Zhenru 11 , Zhongning Road, Caoyang Road station 3 4 11 , Wuning Road 13
- Line 15 - Qi'an Road, Gulang Road, East Wuwei Road, Shanghai West Railway Station 11 , Tongchuan Road 14 , North Meiling Road, Daduhe Road 13 , Changfeng Park

=== Bus ===
There are 34 public diesel bus routes, 4 electric bus routes and 85 long-distance bus routes running through Putuo District.

=== Important Roadways ===
- National Highways
  - G204
  - G312
- National Expressways
  - G42 (Shanghai-Chengdu Expressway)
- Shanghai Expressways
  - S5 (Shanghai-Jiading Expressway)
  - S20(Shanghai Outer Ring Expressway)
- Ring Roads
  - Middle Ring Road
  - Inner Ring Road
- Main Roads
  - North Zhongshan Road
  - Langao Road
  - Xincun Road
  - Caoyang Road
  - Wuning Road
  - Jinshajiang Road
  - Qilianshan Road
  - South Qilianshan Road
  - Meichuan Road
  - Taopu Road
  - Jiaotong Road
  - Moganshan Road
  - Ningxia Road
  - Daduhe Road
  - Zhenbei Road
  - Cao'an Highway
  - Zhennan Road
  - Gulang Road

== Public facilities ==
=== Parks ===
- Changfeng Park
- Suzhou River Mengqingyuan Environmental Park
- Weilai Island Park
- Xianghe Park
- Lanxi Youth Park
- Yichuan Park
- Changshou Park
- Guanlong Park
- Putuo Park
- Caoyang Park
- Zhenguang Park
- Meichuan Park
- Hutai Park
- Haitang Park
- Ganquan Park
- Zhenru Park

=== Post offices ===
In March 2012, the Shanghai Post Putuo District Postal Bureau was established. Due to regulations set out by the Chinese government, in March 2014, the bureau was renamed to Shanghai Post Putuo District Branch.

- Putuo Post Office Sub-Branch
  - Yejiazhai Post Office
  - Changhua Road Post Office
- Hutai Post Office Sub-Branch
  - Yichuan Post Office
  - Ganquan Post Office
- Caoyangxincun Post Office Sub-Branch
  - East China Normal University Post Office
  - Changfengyicun Post Office
- Shiquan Post Office Sub-Branch
- Wuning Road Post Office Sub-Branch
  - Zhenping Post Office
- Taopu Post Office Sub-Branch
  - Tiedao University Post Office
  - West Wuwei Road Post Office
  - Hongmian Road Post Office
- Zhengru Post Office Sub-Branch
  - Beishi Road Post Office
  - Zhenguang Post Office
  - Wanli Post Office
