= Changzheng, Shanghai =

Changzheng 长征镇
- Town
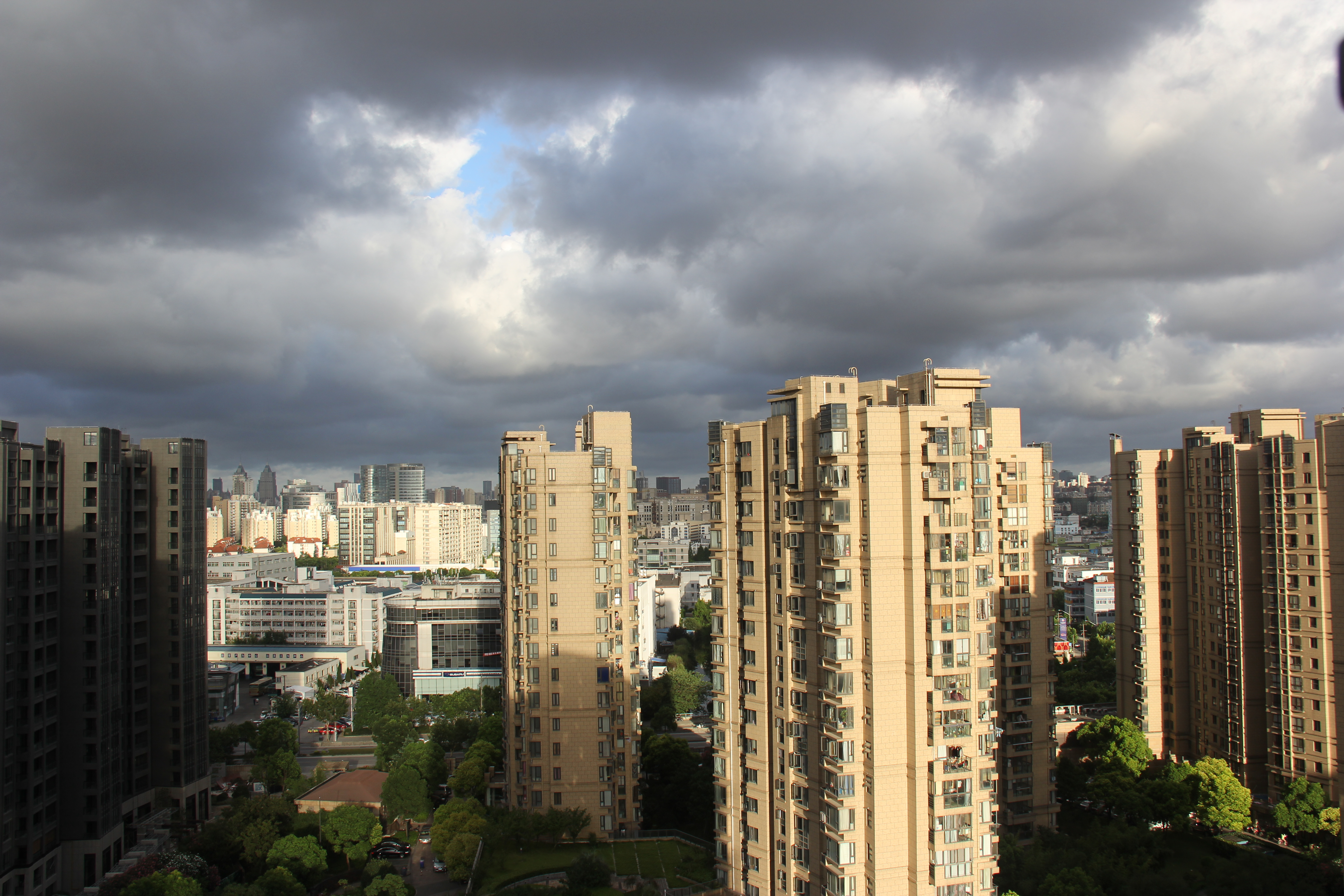
- Jinsha Estate

- Location in Shanghai
- Coordinates: 31°14′16″N 121°22′23″E
- Country: People's Republic of China
- Municipality: Shanghai
- District: Putuo
- Seat: No. 180 Wanzhen Road (万镇路)

Area
  - Total: 7.67 km^{2} (2.96 sq mi)
- Time zone: UTC+8 (China Standard)
- Area code: (0)21
- Website: http://www.shpt.gov.cn/czz/

Changzheng (simplified Chinese: 长征; traditional Chinese: 長征; pinyin: Chángzhēng) is a town in the west of Putuo District, Shanghai.

It has an area of 7.67 square kilometers (2.96 sq mi) and a registered population of 90,900. The governmental center is located at No. 180, Wanzhen Road.

== Climate ==
Changzheng

Climate chart (precipitation, max. and min. temperature)
J	F	M	A	M	J	J	A	S	O	N	D
53 8 1	134 11 4	88 20 8	114 25 11	112 29 15	202 32 21	156 33 24	208 30 27	120 30 22	122 25 16	64 19 8	64 11 4
- █ Average max. and min. temperatures in °C
- █ Precipitation totals in mm
Imperial conversion
J	F	M	A	M	J	J	A	S	O	N	D
2.1 46 34	5.3 52 39	3.5 68 46	4.5 77 52	4.4 84 59	8 90 70	6.1 91 75	8.2 86 81	4.7 86 72	4.8 77 61	2.5 66 46	2.5 52 39
- █ Average max. and min. temperatures in °F
- █ Precipitation totals in inches
