= Wang Yixin =

Chinese politician

- 王一新

Executive Vice Governor of Heilongjiang
- In office January 2023 – December 2023
- Governor: Liang Huiling
- Preceded by: Shen Ying
- Succeeded by: Chen Shaobo

Personal details
- Born: December 1965 (age 60) Yingshan County, Hubei, China
- Party: Chinese Communist Party (1993–2024; expelled)
- Education: Wuhan University

Wang Yixin (Chinese: 王一新; pinyin: Wáng Yīxīn; born December 1965) is a former Chinese politician. As of December 2023 he was under investigation by China's top graft busters. Previously he served as executive vice governor of Heilongjiang.

He was a representative of the 18th National Congress of the Chinese Communist Party. He was a delegate to the 11th and 14th National People's Congress.

== Early life and education ==
Wang was born in Yingshan County, Hubei, in December 1965. In 1983, he enrolled at Wuhan University, where he majored in the History of China.

== Career ==
=== China National Offshore Oil Corporation ===
Beginning in 1987, he served in several posts in the China National Offshore Oil Corporation, including office secretary, director of Editing Department and director of Journalism Department, deputy managing editor, deputy director of the Office, and director of the Office. He joined the Chinese Communist Party (CCP) in June 1993.

=== Hainan ===
In July 2004, he was transferred to the coastal Hainan province and appointed deputy secretary-general of Hainan Provincial People's Government and director of its Research Office. He was made director of Hainan Provincial Agricultural Reclamation Bureau in May 2007, concurrently serving as chairman of Hainan Provincial Agricultural Reclamation Group Co., Ltd..

=== Shanxi ===
He was elevated to vice governor of Shanxi in January 2013, in addition to serving as party secretary of the Shanxi Provincial State-owned Assets Supervision and Administration Commission.

=== Heilongjiang ===
In December 2021, he became vice governor of northeast China's Heilongjiang province, a post he kept until January 2023, when he was promoted again to become executive vice governor of the province. He was a member of the CCP Heilongjiang Provincial Committee, the province's top authority.

== Downfall ==
On 8 December 2023, Wang has come under investigation for "serious violations of discipline and laws" by the Central Commission for Discipline Inspection (CCDI), the party's internal disciplinary body, and the National Supervisory Commission, the highest anti-corruption agency of China.

On 17 June 2024, Wang was expelled from the CCP and dismissed from public office. He was detained by the Supreme People's Procuratorate on July 2. On November 26, he was indicted on suspicion of accepting bribes.

On 15 January 2025, Wang stood trial at the Intermediate People's Court of Heze on charges of taking bribes. Prosecutors accused Wang of taking advantage of his different positions between 2008 and 2020 to seek profits for various companies and individuals in business contracting, land development, and job promotion. In return, he accepted money and gifts worth more than o 129 million yuan ($17.6 million) either directly or from other connections. On May 16, he was sentenced to life imprisonment for bribery, and was deprived of political rights for life and all his properties were also confiscated.

Government offices
| Preceded by Hu Guanghui | Director of the Research Office of the Hainan Provincial People's Government; 2004–2007 | Succeeded by ? |
| Preceded by Wu Yarong (吴亚荣) | Director of Hainan Provincial Agricultural Reclamation Bureau; 2007–2011 | Succeeded by Zhou Gongzu |
| Preceded by Shen Ying | Executive Vice Governor of Heilongjiang; 2023 | Succeeded by Chen Shaobo |
Party political offices
| Preceded by Zhu Xiaoming | Communist Party Secretary of the Shanxi Provincial State-owned Assets Supervision and Administration Commission; 2017–2018 | Succeeded by Guo Baomin (郭保民) |
