= Gynecological Endocrinology =

- Discipline: Gynecology, endocrinology
- Language: English
- Edited by: Anrea R. Genazzani

Publication details
- History: 1987-present
- Publisher: Informa
- Impact factor: 1.360 (2009)

Standard abbreviations
- ISO 4: Gynecol. Endocrinol.

Indexing
- CODEN: GYENER
- ISSN: 0951-3590 (print); 1473-0766 (web)
- OCLC no.: 18175592

Links
- Journal homepage; Online access; Online archive

Gynecological Endocrinology is a monthly peer-reviewed medical journal covering experimental, clinical, and therapeutic aspects of the discipline. The journal includes papers related to the control and function of the different endocrine glands in women, the effects of reproductive events on the endocrine system, and the consequences of endocrine disorders on reproduction. It is the official journal of the International Society of Gynecological Endocrinology.

Gynecological Endocrinology is published by Informa and is edited by Anrea R. Genazzani (University of Pisa, Italy).

The journal was established in 1987 and has a 2009 impact factor of 1.360, ranking it 44th out of 70 journals in the category "Obstetrics and Gynecology".
