= Shujian Road station =

Shanghai Metro station

Shujian Road 曙建路
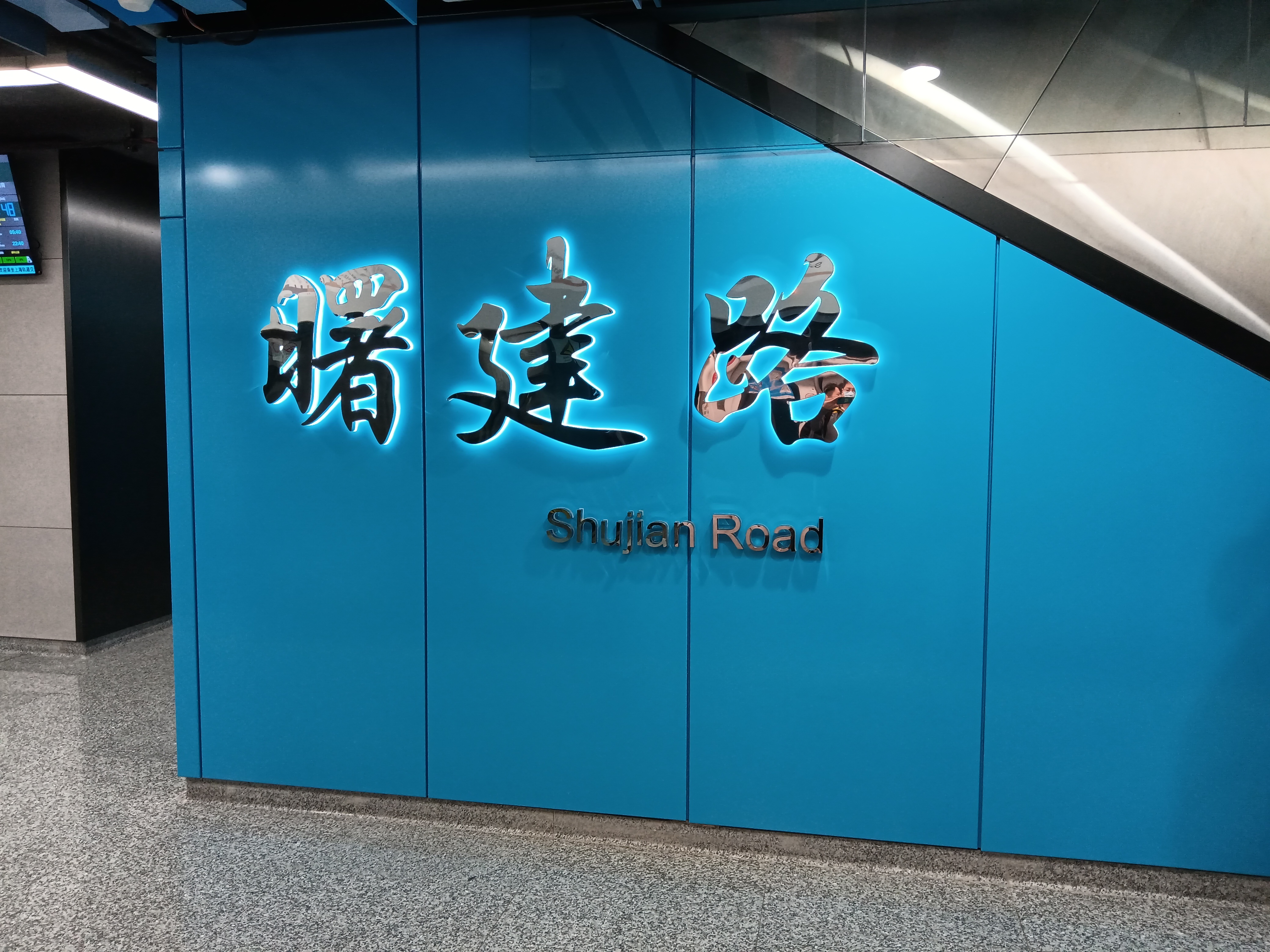
- Platform Sign

General information
- Location: Shujian Road and South Lianhua Road, Minhang District, Shanghai; China
- Coordinates: 31.092729°N 121.413081°E
- Line: Line 15
- Platforms: 2 (1 island platform)
- Tracks: 2

Construction
- Structure type: Underground
- Accessible: Yes

History
- Opened: 23 January 2021

Services
Preceding station	Shanghai Metro	Following station
Jingxi Road towards Gucun Park	Line 15	Shuangbai Road towards Zizhu Hi-tech Park
Location

Shujian Road (Chinese: 曙建路; pinyin: Shǔjiàn Lù) is a metro station on the Line 15 of the Shanghai Metro. Located at the intersection of Shujian Road and South Lianhua Road in Minhang District, Shanghai, the station was scheduled to open with the rest of Line 15 in 2020. However, the station eventually opened on 23 January 2021 following a one-month postponement.
