= Guilin Road station =

Shanghai Metro station

Guilin Road 桂林路
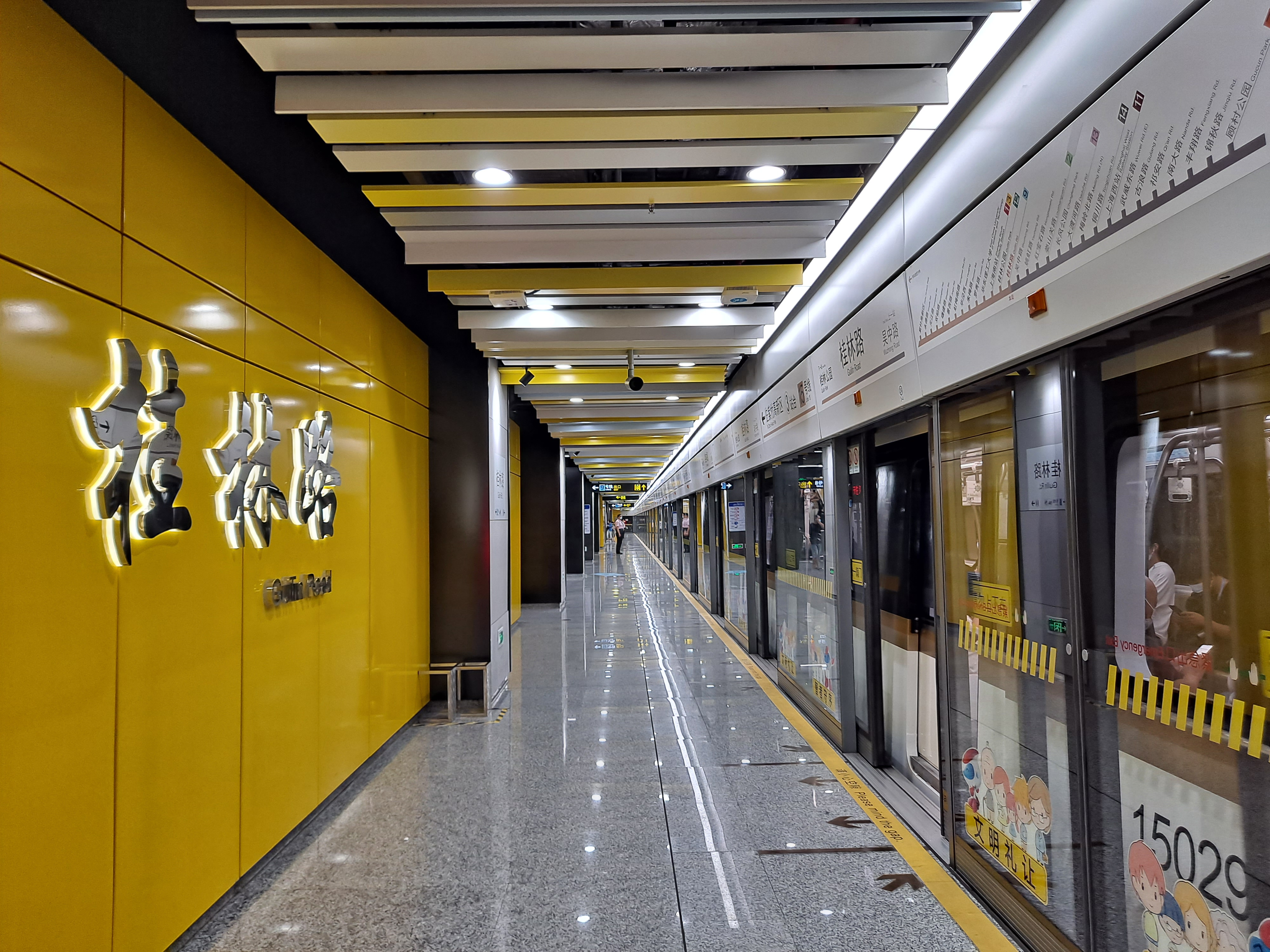
- Line 15 platform

General information
- Location: Yishan Road (宜山路) and Guilin Road; Xuhui District, Shanghai; China
- Coordinates: 31.1767°N 121.412°E
- Operator: Shanghai No. 1 Metro Operation Co. Ltd.
- Lines: Line 9; Line 15
- Platforms: 5 (2 island platforms and 1 side platform)
- Tracks: 5

Construction
- Structure type: Underground
- Accessible: Yes

History
- Opened: 29 December 2007 (Line 9); 27 June 2021 (Line 15)

Services
Preceding station	Shanghai Metro	Following station
Caohejing Hi-Tech Park towards Shanghai Songjiang Railway Station	Line 9	Yishan Road towards Caolu
Wuzhong Road towards Gucun Park	Line 15	Guilin Park towards Zizhu Hi-tech Park
Location
- Location within Shanghai

Guilin Road (Chinese: 桂林路; pinyin: Guìlín Lù) is an interchange station between Line 9 and Line 15 of the Shanghai Metro.

When the line opened on 29 December 2007, it was the eastern terminus of Line 9, with a shuttle bus providing a link between this station and Yishan Road station. On 28 December 2008, the extension to Yishan Road was opened and the shuttle bus service was removed.

The line 9 platforms have 3 tracks, one island platform, and one side platform. The inner island platform is not in service. Trains heading to Caolu use the outer island platform, whilst trains towards Songjiang South Railway Station use the side platform. The line 9 platform utilizes the same platform layout as Zhongchun Road on the same line. The line 15 island platform opened on 27 June 2021 in together with the opening of the transfer between the 2 lines.

== Station layout ==
1F	Ground level	Exits
B1	Line 9 concourse	Tickets, Service Center, Convenient stores
B1	Line 15 concourse	Tickets, Service Center, Convenient stores
B2	Side platform, doors open on the right
B2	Platform 1	← Line 9 towards Shanghai Songjiang Railway Station (Caohejing Hi-Tech Park)
B2	Platform 2-A	Not in service
B2	Island platform, doors open on the left
B2	Platform 2	Line 9 towards Caolu (Yishan Road) →
B3	Platform 4	← Line 15 towards Gucun Park (Wuzhong Road)
B3	Island platform, doors open on the left
B3	Platform 3	Line 15 towards Zizhu Hi-tech Park (Guilin Park) →

== Entrances/exits ==
- 1: Yishan Road, Liuzhou Road
- 4: Yishan Road, Guilin Road
- 5: Yishan Road
- 6: Guilin Road, Yishan Road
- 7: Guilin Road, Yishan Road
- 8: Guilin Road
- 9: Guilin Road, Qinjiang Road
- 10: Qinjiang Road
- 11: Guilin Road
- 12: Guilin Road, Qinzhou Road (N)
- 13: Guilin Road
