= Nanda Road station =

Metro station in Shanghai, China

Nanda Road 南大路
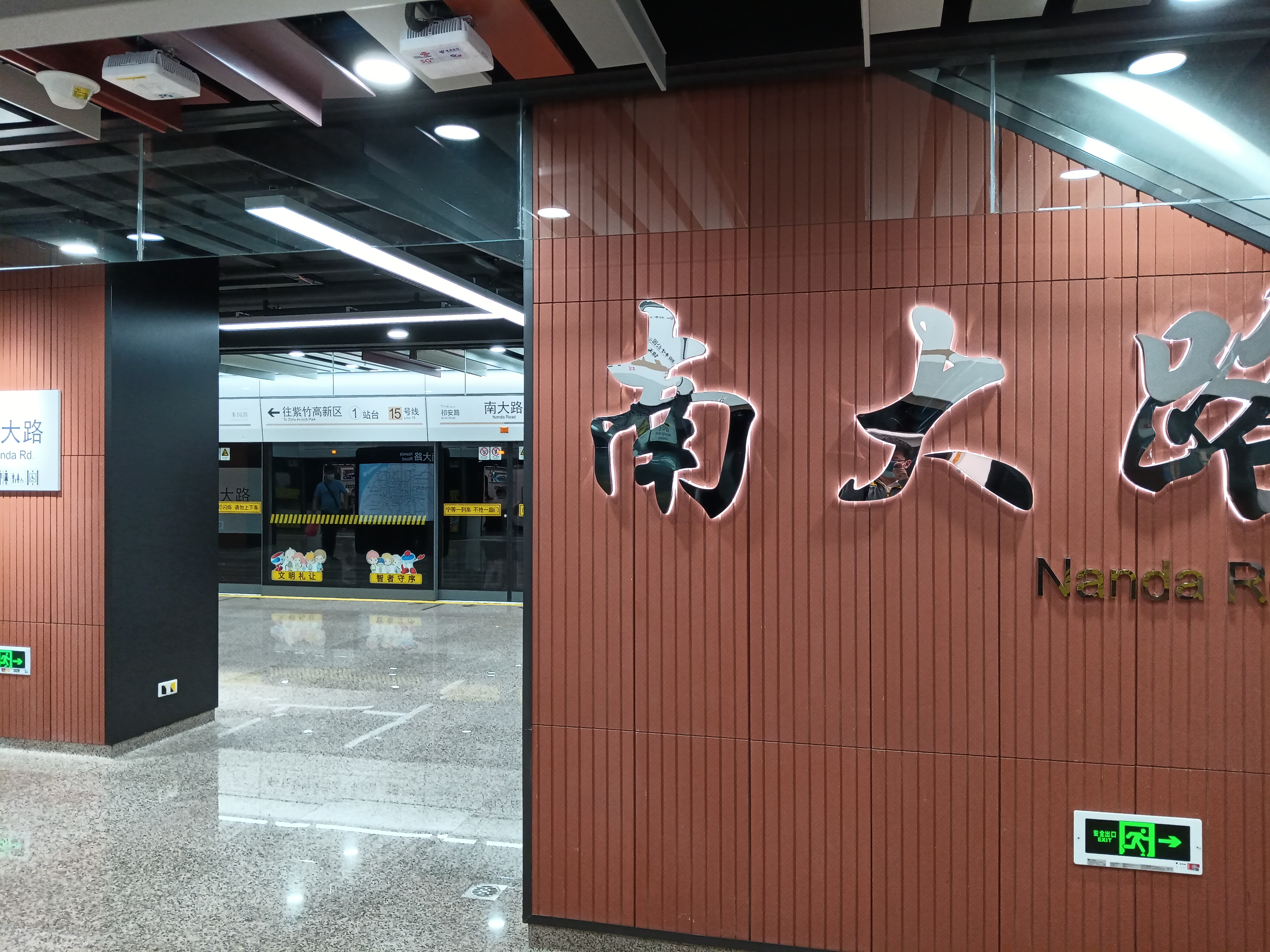
- Platform

General information
- Location: Qilianshan Road and Nanda Road, Baoshan District, Shanghai; China
- Coordinates: 31.30111°N 121.37579°E
- Line: Line 15
- Platforms: 2 (1 island platform)
- Tracks: 2

Construction
- Structure type: Underground
- Accessible: Yes

History
- Opened: 23 January 2021

Services
Preceding station	Shanghai Metro	Following station
Fengxiang Road towards Gucun Park	Line 15	Qi'an Road towards Zizhu Hi-tech Park
Location

Nanda Road (Chinese: 南大路; pinyin: Nándà Lù) is a metro station on the Line 15 of the Shanghai Metro. Located at the intersection of Qilianshan Road and Nanda Road in Putuo District, Shanghai, the station was scheduled to open with the rest of Line 15 by the end of 2020. However, the station eventually opened on 23 January 2021 following a one-month postponement. It is located in between Fengxiang Road station to the north and Qi'an Road station to the south.
