= Luoxiu Road station =

Metro station in Shanghai, China

Luoxiu Road 罗秀路
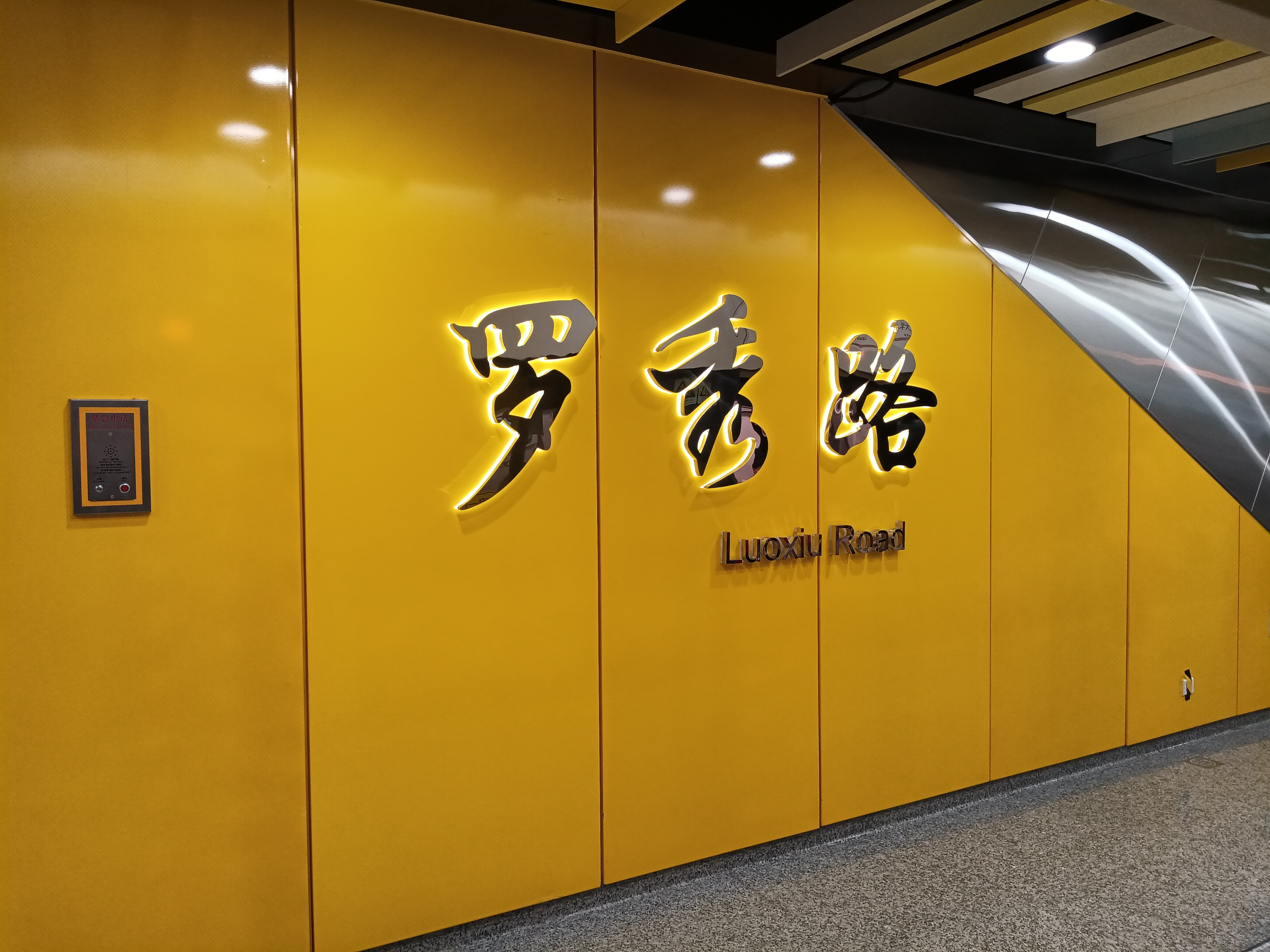
- Platform Sign

General information
- Location: Laohumin Road and Luoxiu Road, Xuhui District, Shanghai; China
- Coordinates: 31.1335°N 121.4312°E
- Line: Line 15
- Platforms: 2 (1 island platform)
- Tracks: 2

Construction
- Structure type: Underground
- Accessible: Yes

History
- Opened: 23 January 2021

Services
Preceding station	Shanghai Metro	Following station
East China University of Science and Technology towards Gucun Park	Line 15	Zhumei Road towards Zizhu Hi-tech Park
Location

Luoxiu Road (simplified Chinese: 罗秀路; traditional Chinese: 羅秀路; pinyin: Luóxiù Lù) is a metro station on the Line 15 of the Shanghai Metro. Located at the intersection of Laohumin Road and Luoxiu Road in Xuhui District, Shanghai, the station was scheduled to open with the rest of Line 15 by the end of 2020. However, the station eventually opened on 23 January 2021 following a one-month postponement. The station is located between East China University of Science and Technology to the north and Zhumei Road to the south.

== Station layout ==
G
Street level
Entrances and exits
B1
Concourse
Tickets
B2
Platform 2
← Line 15 towards Gucun Park (East China University of Science and Technology)
Island platform, doors open on the left for both trains
Platform 1

Line 15 towards Zizhu Hi-tech Park (Zhumei Road) →
