= Hongbaoshi Road station =

Metro station in Shanghai

Hongbaoshi Road 红宝石路
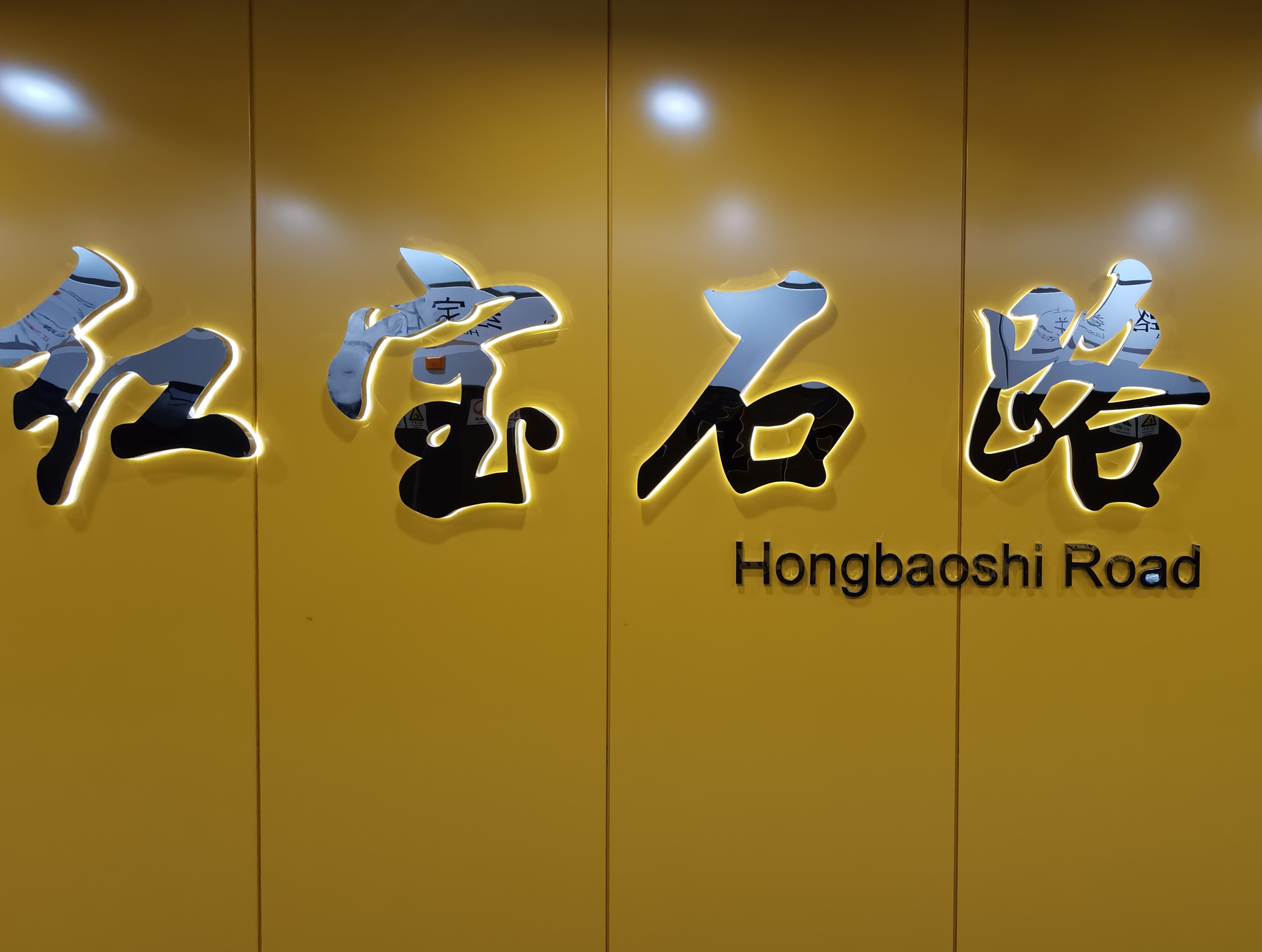
- Station sign

General information
- Location: Gubei Road, Hongqiao Road, and West Yan'an Road, Changning District, Shanghai; China
- Coordinates: 31.2008°N 121.3936°E
- Line: Line 15
- Platforms: 2 (1 island platform)
- Tracks: 2

Construction
- Structure type: Underground
- Accessible: Yes

History
- Opened: 23 January 2021
- Previous names: Gubei Road (古北路)

Services
Preceding station	Shanghai Metro	Following station
Loushanguan Road towards Gucun Park	Line 15	Yaohong Road towards Zizhu Hi-tech Park
Location

Hongbaoshi Road (simplified Chinese: 红宝石路; traditional Chinese: 紅寶石路; pinyin: Hóngbǎoshí Lù), formerly known as Gubei Road (Chinese: 古北路; pinyin: Gǔběi Lù), is a metro station on the Line 15 of the Shanghai Metro. Located at the intersection of West Yan'an Road, Hongqiao Road, and Gubei Road in Changning District, Shanghai, the station is scheduled to open with the rest of Line 15 by the end of 2020. It is located just north of the intersection of Hongbaoshi Road and Gubei Road, the former of which gives the station its name. The station is located between Loushanguan Road to the north and Yaohong Road to the south.

Although the station is located very close to the spot where Line 15 intersects with Line 10 of the Shanghai Metro, which runs underneath Hongqiao Road, it is located mid-way between Shuicheng Road and Yili Road stations, and there is no interchange possible at this station to Line 10. Whether an out-of-station transfer will be allowed remains to be seen.
