= South Hongmei Road station =

Shanghai Metro station

South Hongmei Road 虹梅南路
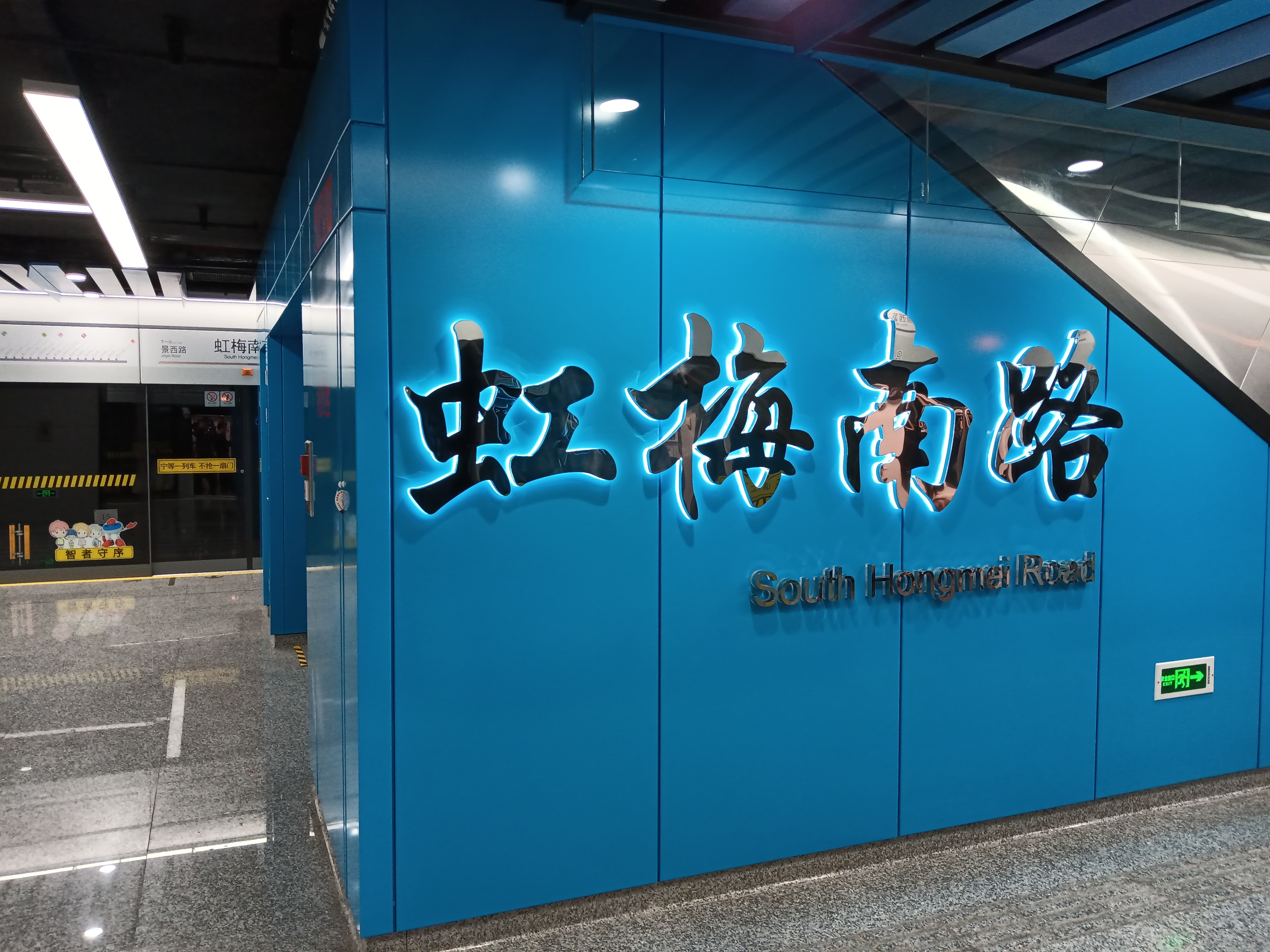
- Platform Sign

General information
- Location: South Hongmei Road and Yindu Road, Minhang District, Shanghai; China
- Coordinates: 31.105668°N 121.428407°E
- Line: Line 15
- Platforms: 2 (1 island platform)
- Tracks: 2

Construction
- Structure type: Underground
- Accessible: Yes

History
- Opened: 23 January 2021

Services
| Preceding station | Shanghai Metro | Following station |
|---|---|---|
| Jinghong Road towards Gucun Park | Line 15 | Jingxi Road towards Zizhu Hi-tech Park |
Location

South Hongmei Road (Chinese: 虹梅南路; pinyin: Hóngméi Nán Lù) is a metro station on the Line 15 of the Shanghai Metro. Located at the intersection of South Hongmei Road and Yindu Road in Minhang District, Shanghai, the station is scheduled to open with the rest of Line 15 in 2020. However, the station eventually opened on 23 January 2021 following a one-month postponement. This is the first station heading southbound that the station interior is blue.
