= Jingxi Road station =

Metro station on the Shanghai Metro

Jingxi Road 景西路
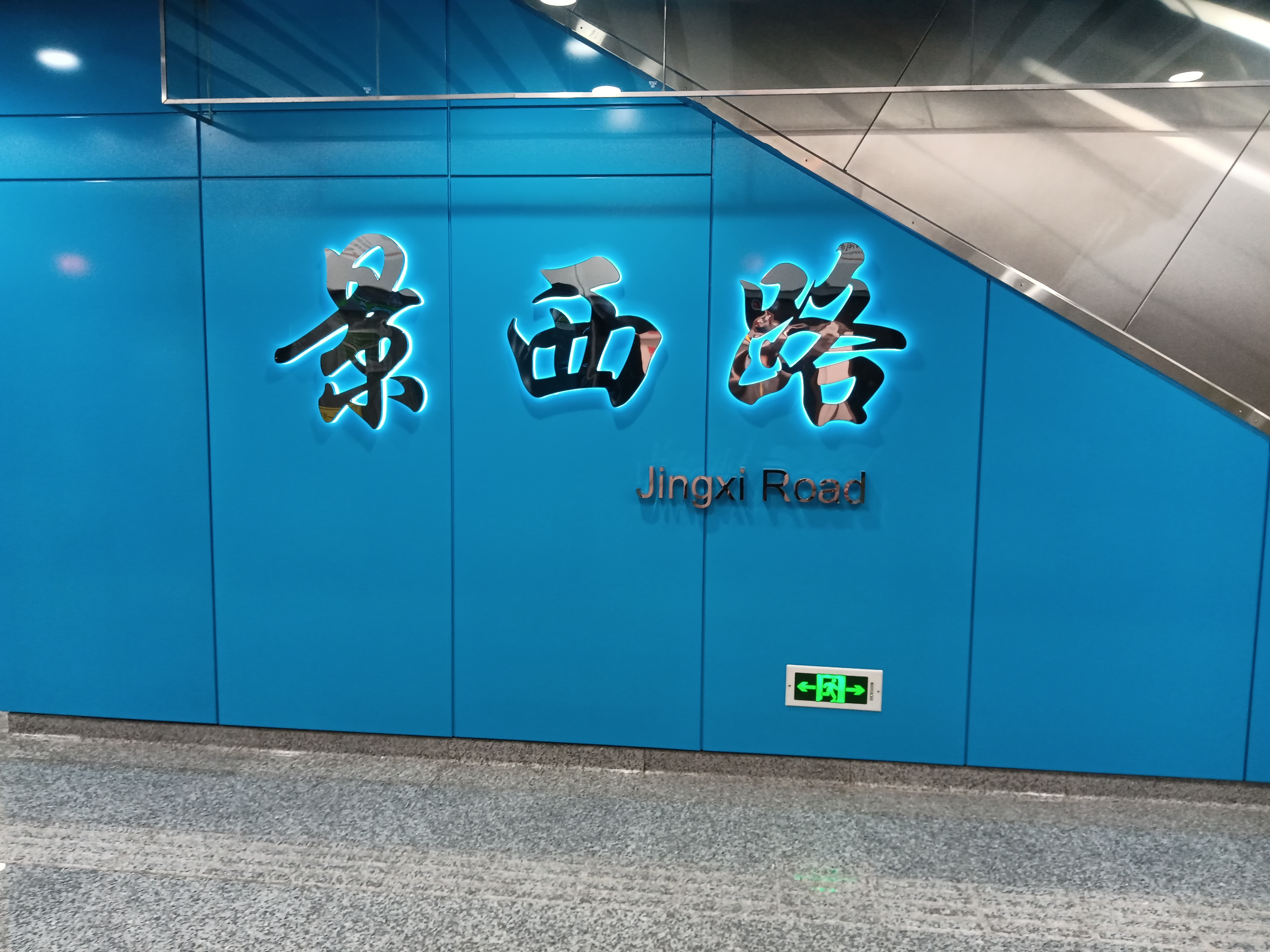
- Platform Sign

General information
- Location: Jingxi Road and Yindu Road, Minhang District, Shanghai; China
- Coordinates: 31.101683°N 121.414757°E
- Line: Line 15
- Platforms: 2 (1 island platform)
- Tracks: 2

Construction
- Structure type: Underground
- Accessible: Yes

History
- Opened: 23 January 2021

Services
Preceding station	Shanghai Metro	Following station
South Hongmei Road towards Gucun Park	Line 15	Shujian Road towards Zizhu Hi-tech Park
Location

Jingxi Road (Chinese: 景西路; pinyin: Jǐngxī Lù) is a metro station on the Line 15 of the Shanghai Metro. Located at the intersection of Jingxi Road and Yindu Road in Minhang District, Shanghai, the station was originally scheduled to open with the rest of Line 15 in 2020. The station officially opened on January 23, 2021 following a one-month postponement.
