= East China University of Science and Technology station =

Metro station in Shanghai, China

East China University of Science and Technology 华东理工大学
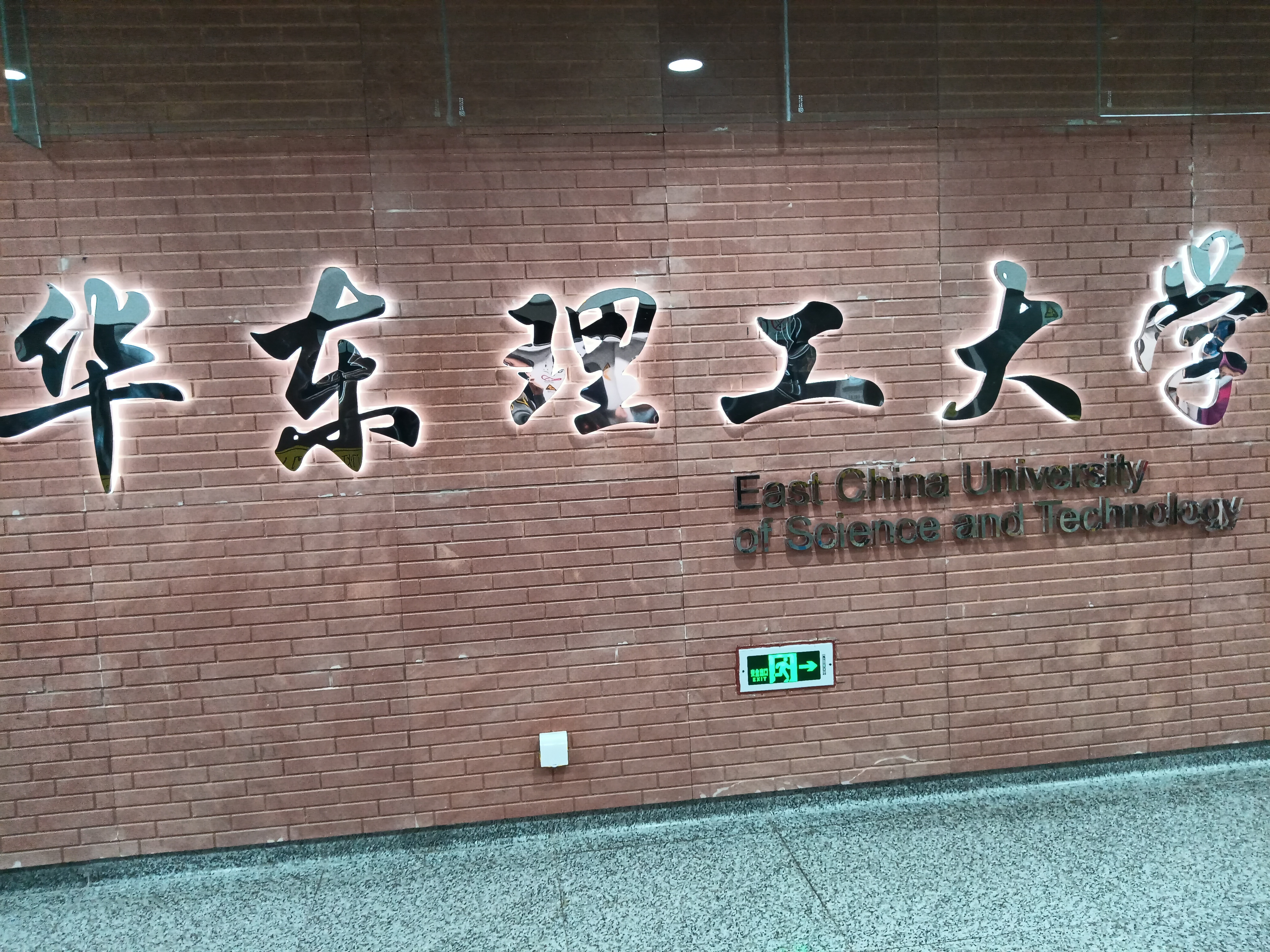
- Platform Sign

General information
- Location: Laohumin Road, Bose Road, and Meilong Road, Xuhui District, Shanghai; China
- Coordinates: 31.1447°N 121.4244°E
- Line: Line 15
- Platforms: 2 (1 island platform)
- Tracks: 2

Construction
- Structure type: Underground
- Accessible: Yes

History
- Opened: 23 January 2021
- Previous names: Bose Road (百色路)

Services
Preceding station	Shanghai Metro	Following station
Shanghai South Railway Station towards Gucun Park	Line 15	Luoxiu Road towards Zizhu Hi-tech Park
Location

East China University of Science and Technology (simplified Chinese: 华东理工大学; traditional Chinese: 華東理工大學; pinyin: Huádōng Lǐgōng Dàxué), formerly known as Bose Road (Chinese: 百色路; pinyin: Bósè Lù), is a metro station on the Line 15 of the Shanghai Metro. Located at the intersection of Laohumin Road, Bose Road, and Meilong Road in Xuhui District, Shanghai, the station was scheduled to open with the rest of Line 15 by the end of 2020. However, the station eventually opened on 23 January 2021 following a one-month postponement. The station is located between Shanghai South Railway Station to the north and Luoxiu Road to the south. It is named after the nearby East China University of Science and Technology main campus.

== Station layout ==
G
Street level
Entrances and exits
B1
Concourse
Tickets, customer service counters
B2
Platform 2
← Line 15 towards Gucun Park (Shanghai South Railway Station)
Island platform, doors open on the left for both trains
Platform 1

Line 15 towards Zizhu Hi-tech Park (Luoxiu Road) →
