= Yuanjiang Road station =

Shanghai Metro station

Yuanjiang Road 元江路
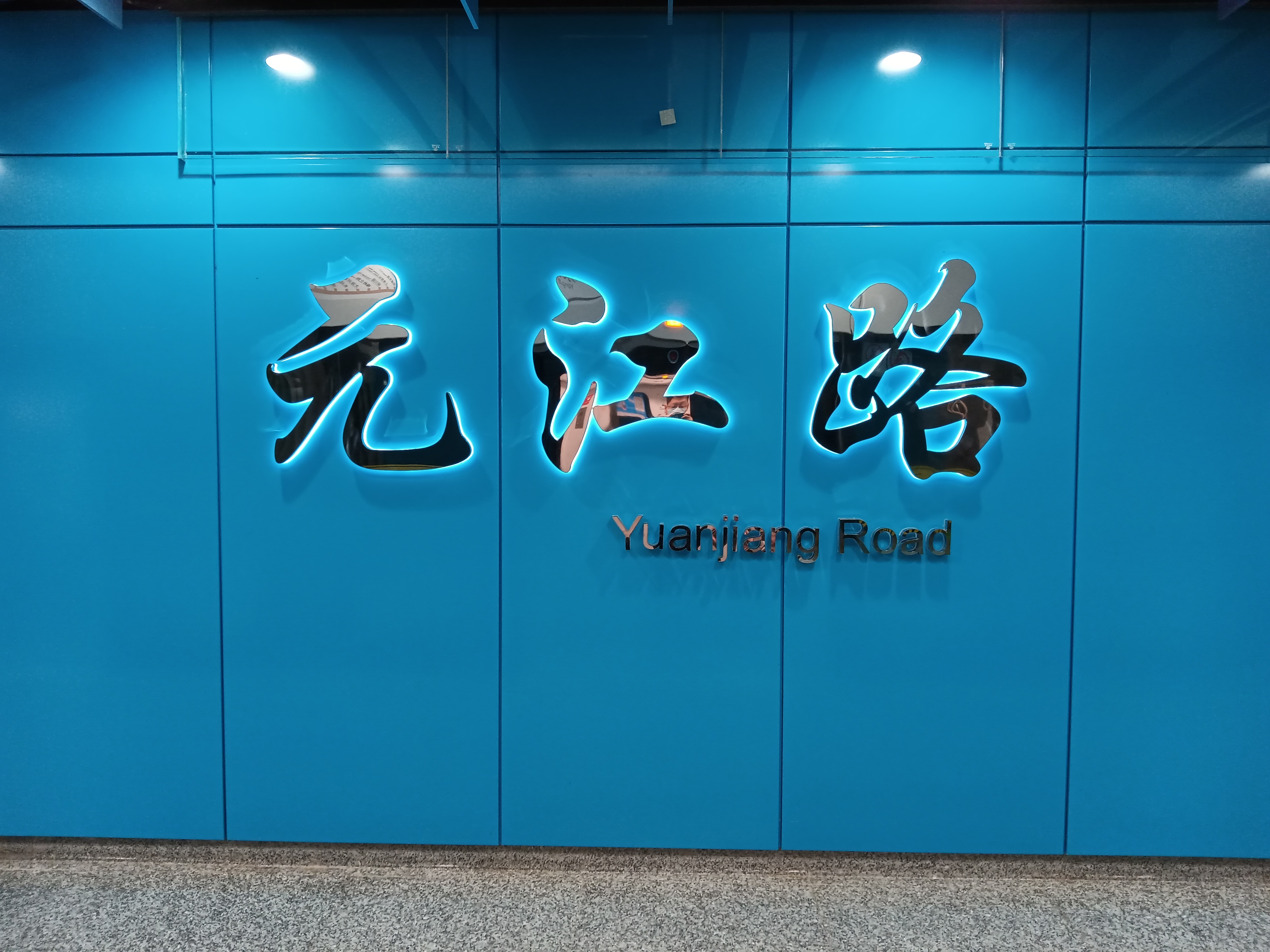
- Platform Sign

General information
- Location: Yuanjiang Road and South Lianhua Road, Minhang District, Shanghai; China
- Coordinates: 31.065199°N 121.427055°E
- Line: Line 15
- Platforms: 2 (1 island platform)
- Tracks: 2

Construction
- Structure type: Underground
- Accessible: Yes

History
- Opened: 23 January 2021

Services
Preceding station	Shanghai Metro	Following station
Shuangbai Road towards Gucun Park	Line 15	Yongde Road towards Zizhu Hi-tech Park
Location

Yuanjiang Road (Chinese: 元江路; pinyin: Yuánjiāng Lù) is a metro station on Line 15 of the Shanghai Metro. Located at the intersection of Yuanjiang Road and South Lianhua Road in Minhang District, Shanghai, the station is scheduled to open with the rest of Line 15 in 2020. However, the station eventually opened on 23 January 2021 following a one-month postponement.
