= Zhumei Road station =

Metro station in Shanghai, China

Zhumei Road 朱梅路
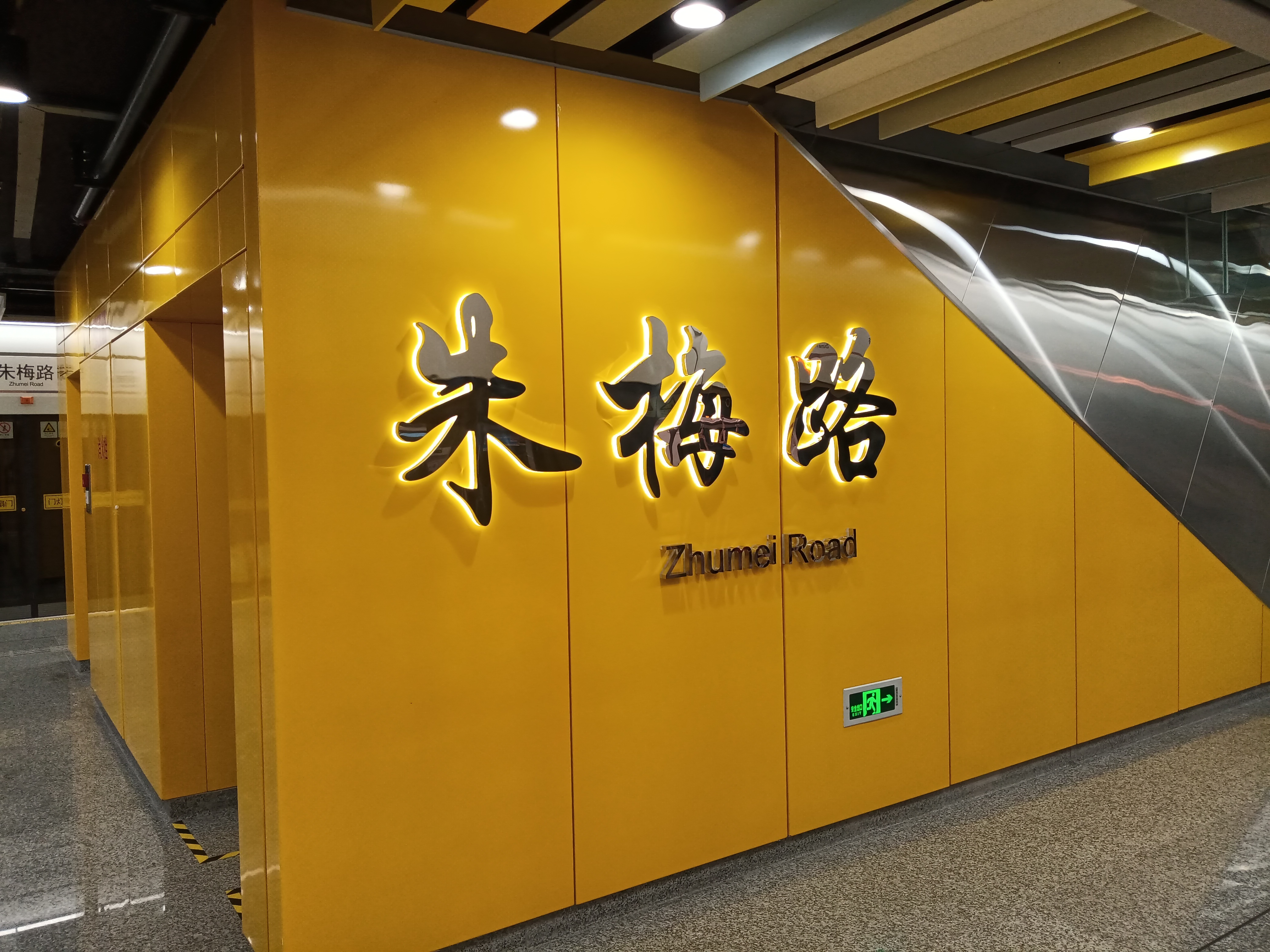
- Platform Sign

General information
- Location: Laohumin Road and Zhumei Road, Xuhui District and Minhang district, Shanghai; China
- Coordinates: 31.1261°N 121.4332°E
- Line: Line 15
- Platforms: 2 (1 island platform)
- Tracks: 2

Construction
- Structure type: Underground
- Accessible: Yes

History
- Opened: 23 January 2021

Services
Preceding station	Shanghai Metro	Following station
Luoxiu Road towards Gucun Park	Line 15	Jinghong Road towards Zizhu Hi-tech Park
Location

Zhumei Road (Chinese: 朱梅路; pinyin: Zhūméi Lù) is a metro station on the Line 15 of the Shanghai Metro. Located at the intersection of Laohumin Road and Zhumei Road on the border between Xuhui District and Minhang district, Shanghai, the station was scheduled to open with the rest of Line 15 by the end of 2020. However, the station eventually opened on 23 January 2021 following a one-month postponement. The station is located between Luoxiu Road to the north and Jinghong Road to the south.

== Station layout ==
G
Street level
Entrances and exits
B1
Concourse
Tickets, customer service
B2
Platform 2
← Line 15 towards Gucun Park (Luoxiu Road)
Island platform, doors open on the left
Platform 1

Line 15 towards Zizhu Hi-tech Park (Jinghong Road) →
