= Wuzhong Road station =

Metro station in Shanghai

Wuzhong Road 吴中路
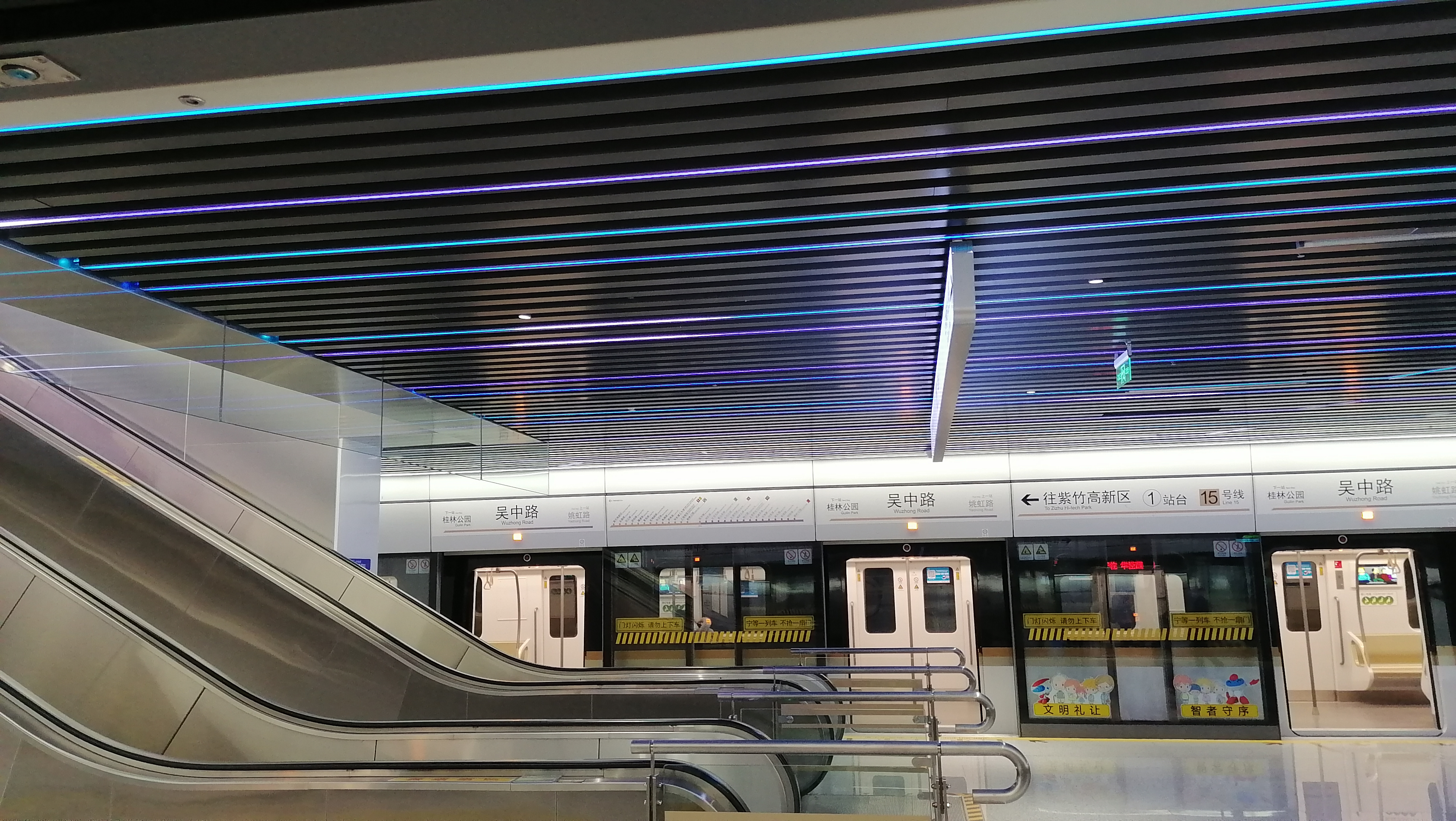
- Platform

General information
- Location: Guilin Road and Wuzhong Road, Minhang District, Shanghai; China
- Coordinates: 31.1863°N 121.4093°E
- Line: Line 15
- Platforms: 2 (1 island platform)
- Tracks: 2

Construction
- Structure type: Underground
- Accessible: Yes

History
- Opened: 23 January 2021

Services
Preceding station	Shanghai Metro	Following station
Yaohong Road towards Gucun Park	Line 15	Guilin Road towards Zizhu Hi-tech Park
Location

Wuzhong Road (simplified Chinese: 吴中路; traditional Chinese: 吳中路; pinyin: Wúzhōng Lù) is a metro station on the Line 15 of the Shanghai Metro. Located south of the intersection of Guilin Road and Wuzhong Road in Minhang District, Shanghai, the station was scheduled to open with the rest of Line 15 by the end of 2020. However, the station eventually opened on 23 January 2021 following a one-month postponement. The station is located in between Yaohong Road to the north and Guilin Road to the south. This is the Only Station on Line 15 where there are lights in the ceiling and the sign is white instead of black.

== Gallery ==
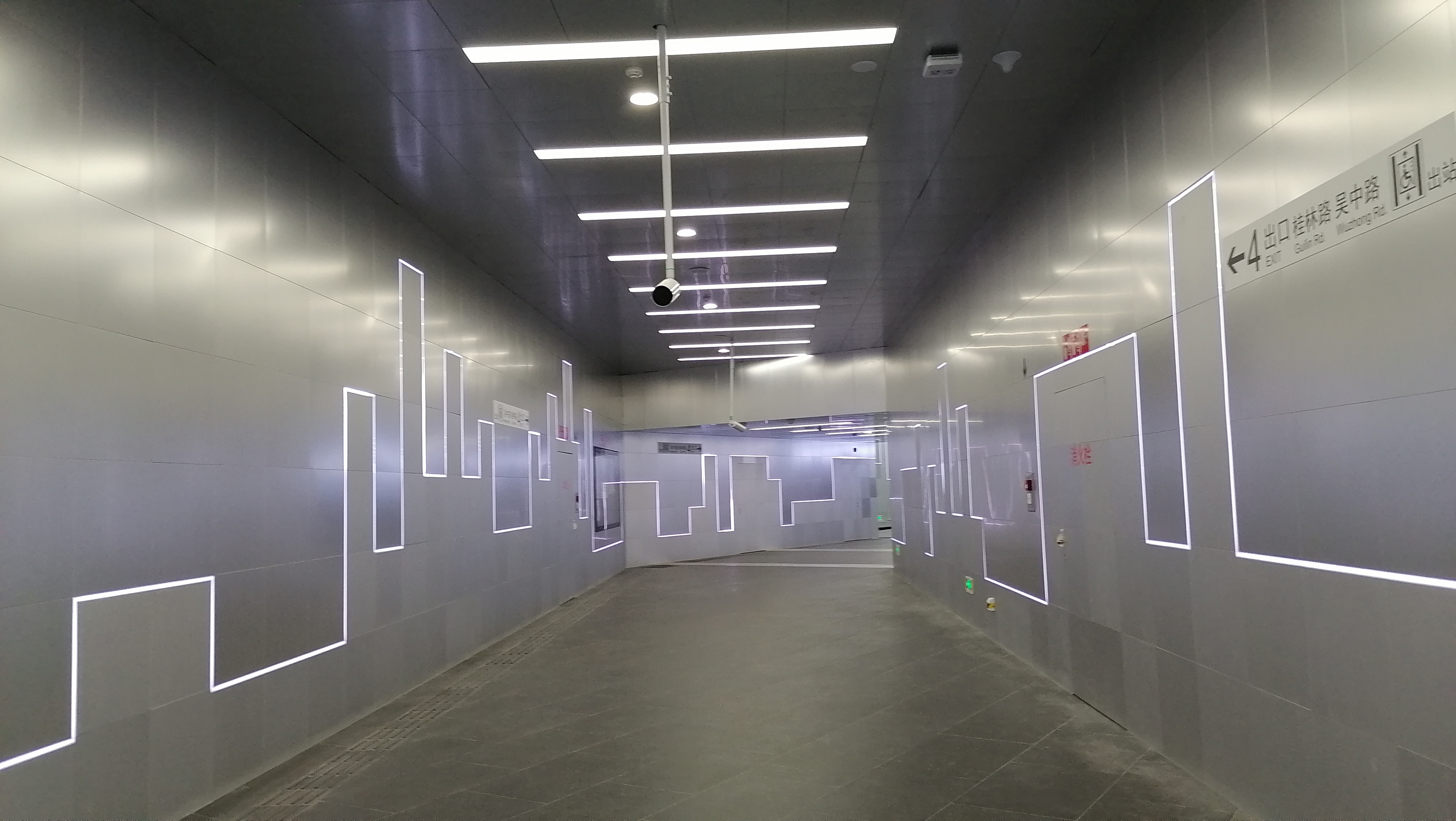
Entrance Decoration

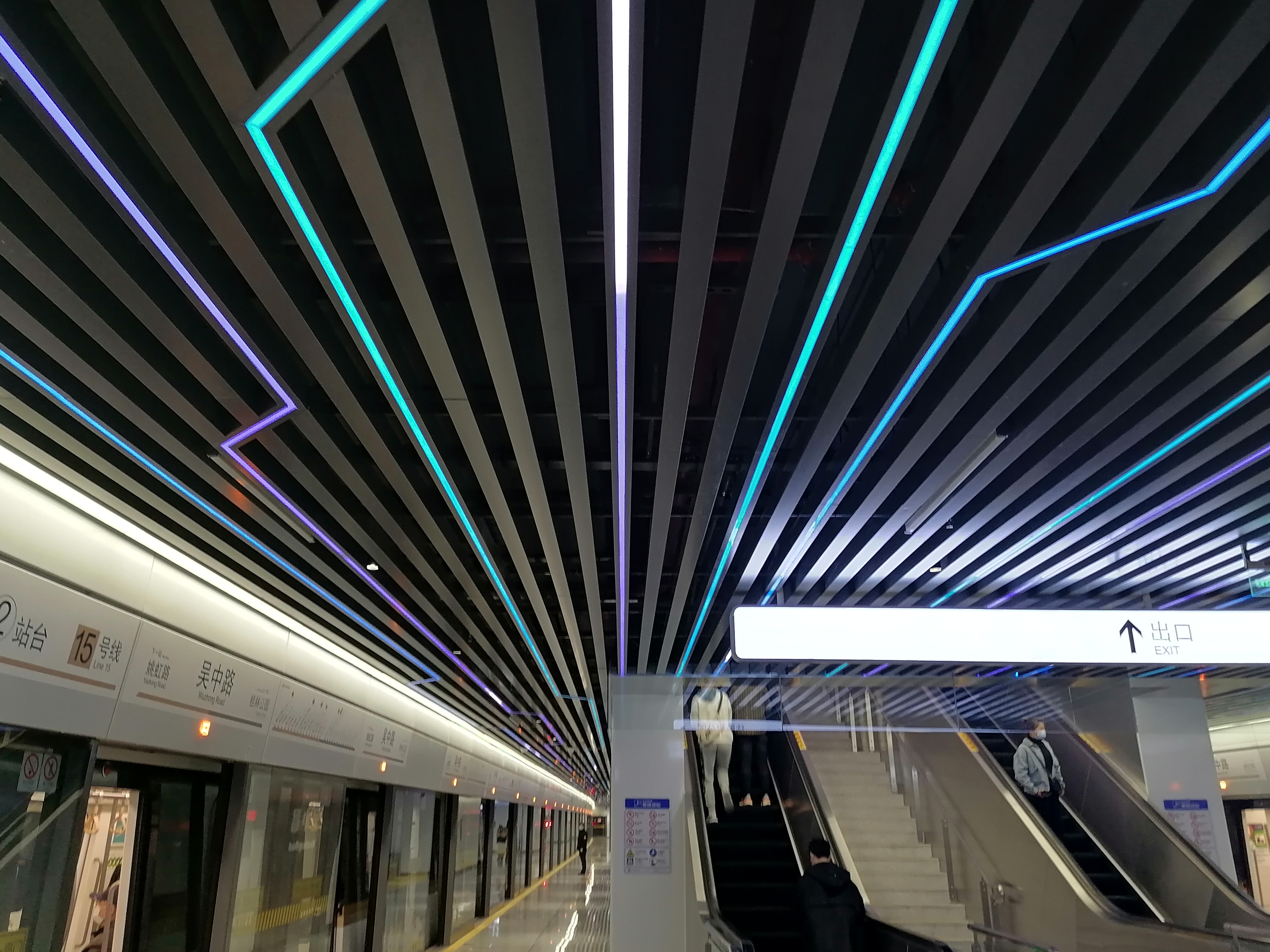
Platform Decoration

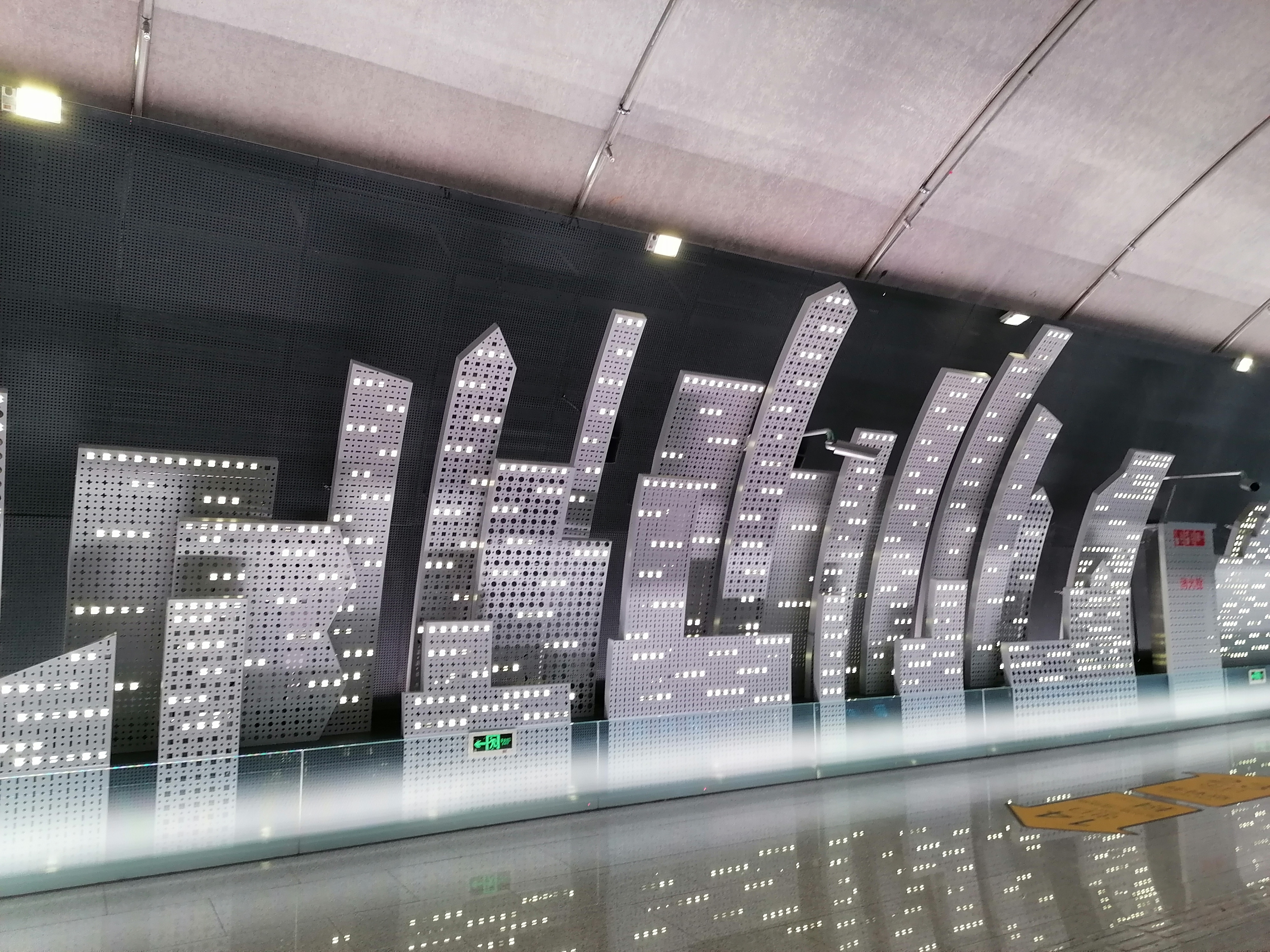
Puxi side
