= Fengxiang Road station =

Metro station in Shanghai, China

Fengxiang Road 丰翔路
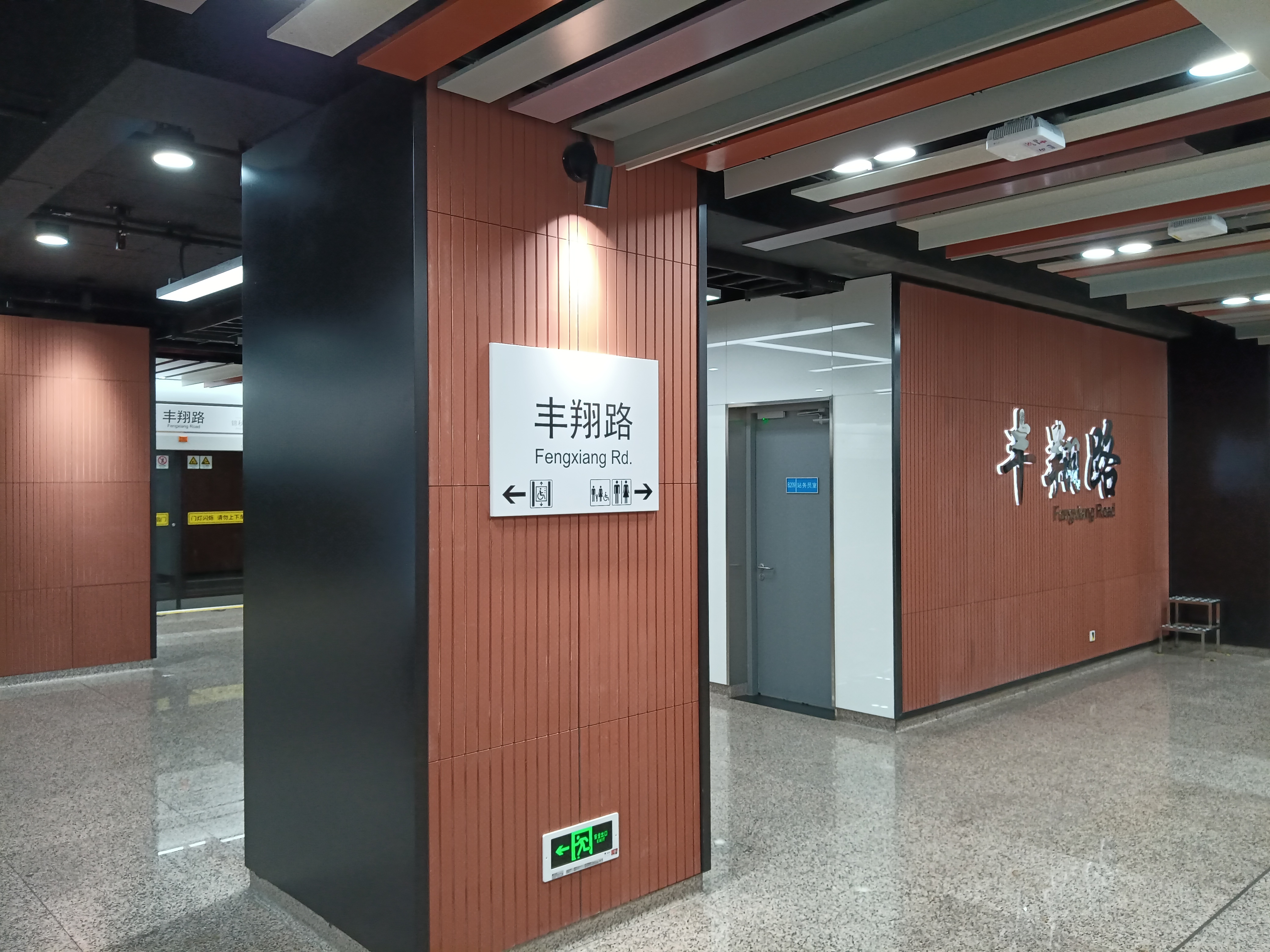
- Platform

General information
- Location: Qilianshan Road at Fengxiang Road and North Huanzhen Road, Baoshan District, Shanghai; China
- Coordinates: 31.3102°N 121.37623°E
- Line: Line 15
- Platforms: 2 (1 island platform)
- Tracks: 2

Construction
- Structure type: Underground
- Accessible: Yes

History
- Opened: 23 January 2021

Services
Preceding station	Shanghai Metro	Following station
Jinqiu Road towards Gucun Park	Line 15	Nanda Road towards Zizhu Hi-tech Park
Location

Fengxiang Road (simplified Chinese: 丰翔路; traditional Chinese: 豐翔路; pinyin: Fēngxiáng Lù) is a metro station on the Line 15 of the Shanghai Metro. Located at the intersection of Qilianshan Road with Fengxiang Road and North Huanzhen Road in Putuo District, Shanghai, the station was scheduled to open with the rest of Line 15 by the end of 2020. However, the station eventually opened on 23 January 2021 following a one-month postponement. It is located in between Jinqiu Road station to the north and Nanda Road station to the south.
