= Jinghong Road station =

Metro station in Shanghai, China

Jinghong Road 景洪路
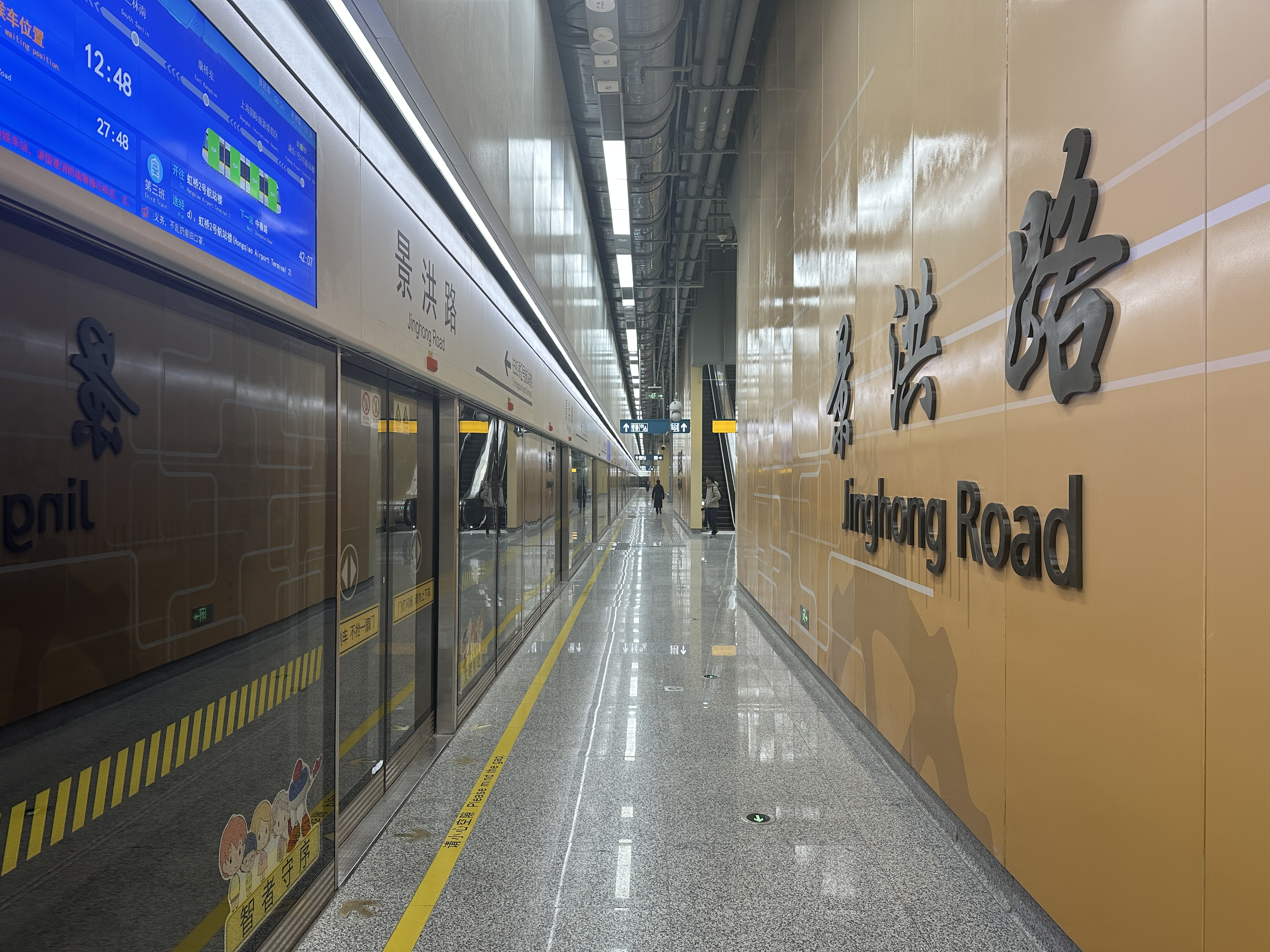
- Platform of the Airport Link line

General information
- Other names: West Huajing (华泾西) (before 21 September 2024)
- Location: Jinghong Road and Huaji Road; Xuhui District and Minhang District boundary, Shanghai; China
- Coordinates: 31.114222°N 121.435782°E
- Line: Line 15
- Platforms: 3 (1 island platform and 2 side platforms)
- Tracks: 4

Construction
- Structure type: Underground
- Accessible: Yes

History
- Opened: 23 January 2021; 5 years ago (Line 15); 27 December 2024; 16 months ago (Airport Link Line)

Services
Preceding station	Shanghai Metro	Following station
Zhumei Road towards Gucun Park	Line 15	South Hongmei Road towards Zizhu Hi-tech Park
Preceding station	Shanghai Suburban Railway	Following station
Zhongchun Road towards Hongqiao Airport Terminal 2	Airport Link Line	South Sanlin towards Pudong Airport Terminal 1&2
Location

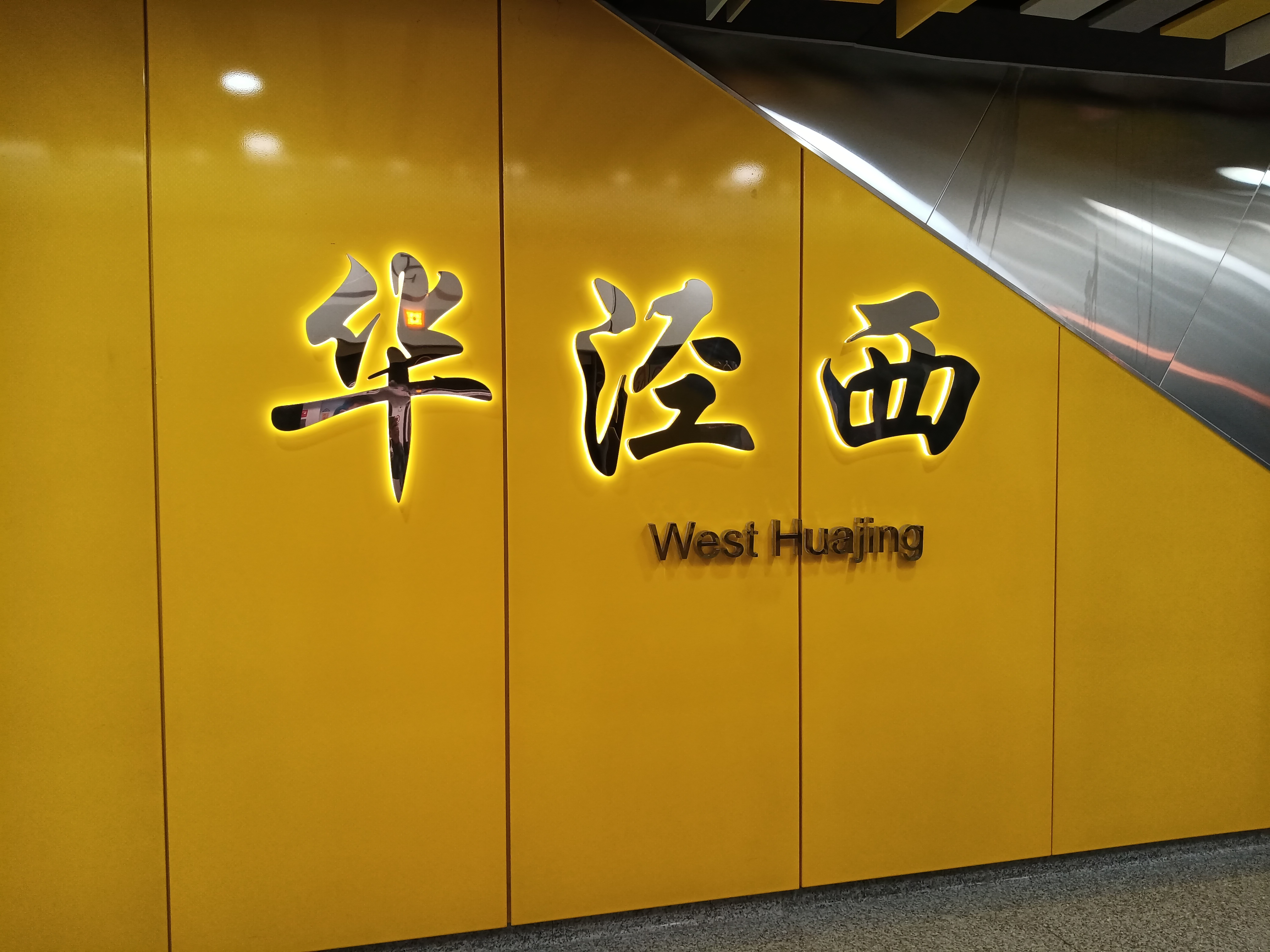
Platform sign of line 15 before renaming

Jinghong Road (Chinese: 景洪路; pinyin: Jǐnghóng Lù), formerly West Huajing (Chinese: 华泾西; pinyin: Huájīng Xī) is a metro station on the Line 15 of the Shanghai Metro. Located along an unbuilt section of Jinghong Road near its intersection with an unbuilt section of Huaji Road and straddling the boundary between Minhang and Xuhui districts in the city of Shanghai, the station was scheduled to open with the rest of Line 15 in 2020. However, the station eventually opened on 23 January 2021 following a one-month postponement. Half-Trains terminated here and trains would have to switch tracks to return to northbound track towards Gucun Park, until the south terminal station of short-route trains was extended to Shuangbai Road station.

To match the station of Airport link line, the metro station has renamed in 21 September 2024.
