= Yaohong Road station =

Shanghai Metro station

Yaohong Road 姚虹路
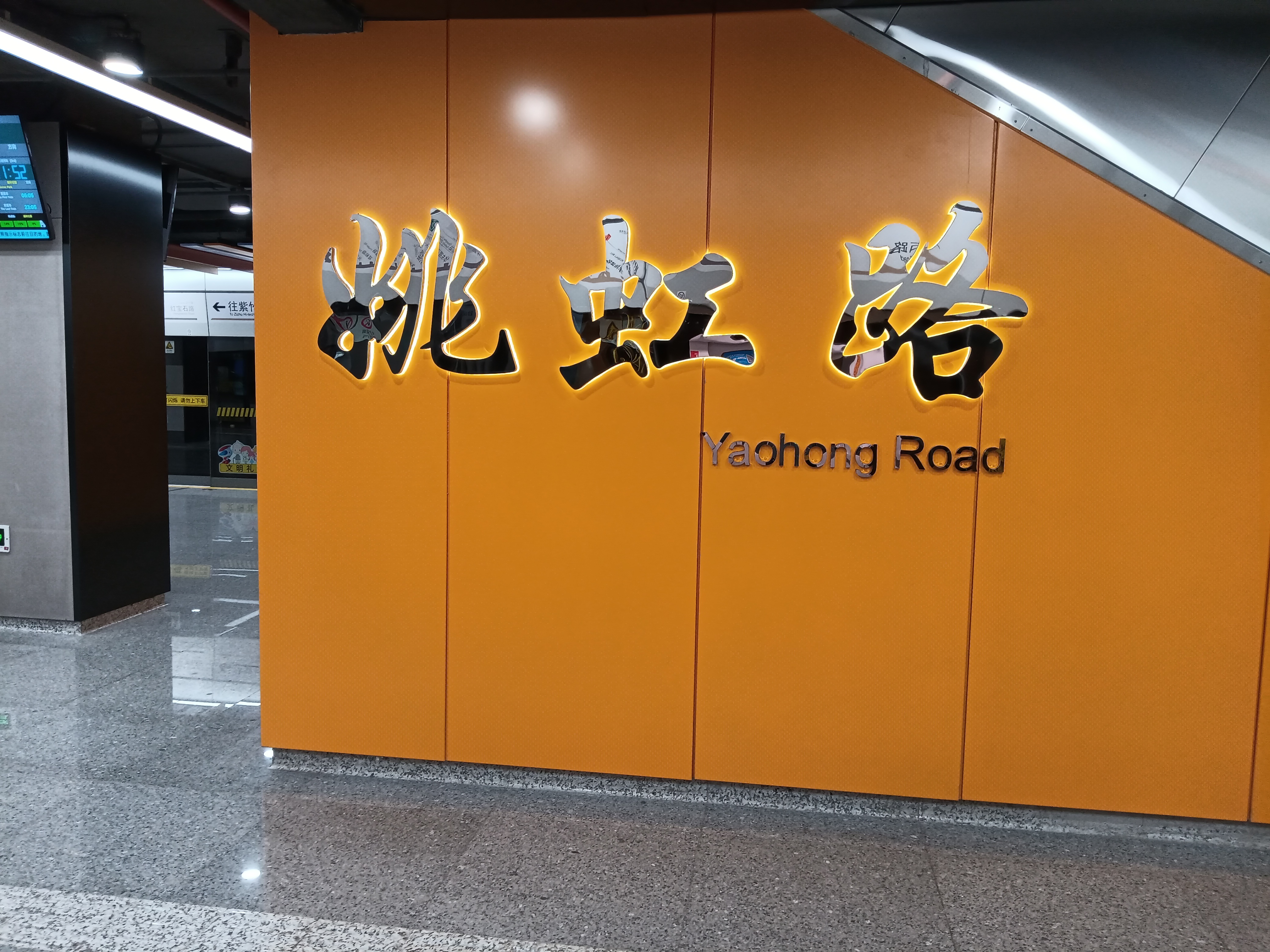
- Platform

General information
- Location: Guyang Road and Yaohong Road, Changning District, Shanghai; China
- Coordinates: 31.1933°N 121.40327°E
- Line: Line 15
- Platforms: 2 (1 island platform)
- Tracks: 2

Construction
- Structure type: Underground
- Accessible: Yes

History
- Opened: 23 January 2021

Services
Preceding station	Shanghai Metro	Following station
Hongbaoshi Road towards Gucun Park	Line 15	Wuzhong Road towards Zizhu Hi-tech Park
Location

Yaohong Road (Chinese: 姚虹路; pinyin: Yáohóng Lù) is a metro station on the Line 15 of the Shanghai Metro. Located at the intersection of Guyang Road and Yaohong Road in Changning District, Shanghai, the station is scheduled to open with the rest of Line 15 by the end of 2020. However, the station eventually opened on 23 January 2021 following a one-month postponement. The station is one of the few stations of the line located on an east–west orientation. The adjacent stations on the line are Hongbaoshi Road to the north and Wuzhong Road to the south.
