= Shuangbai Road station =

Shanghai Metro station

Shuangbai Road 双柏路
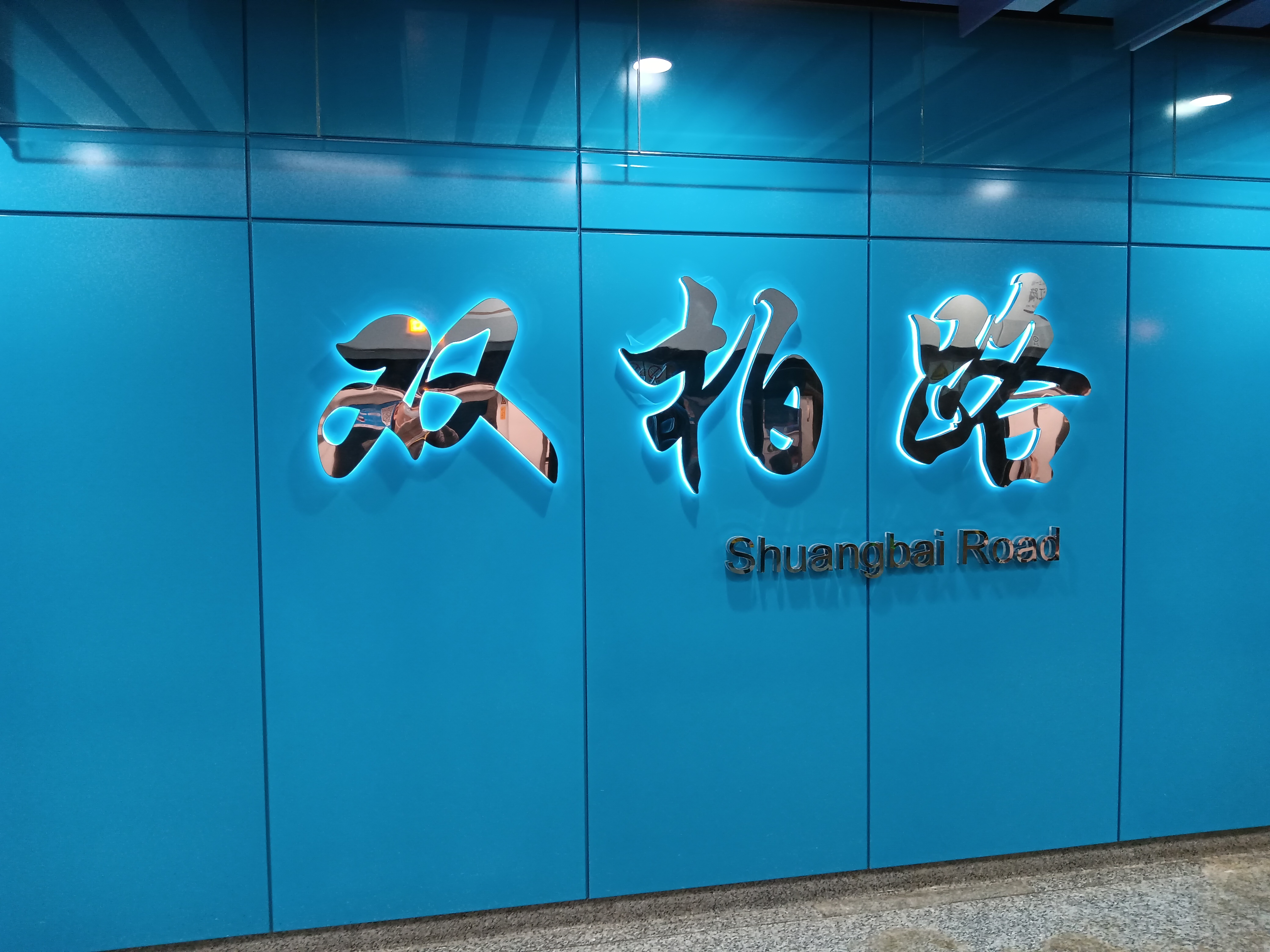
- Platform Sign

General information
- Location: Shuangbai Road and South Lianhua Road, Minhang District, Shanghai; China
- Coordinates: 31.084588°N 121.417453°E
- Line: Line 15
- Platforms: 2 (1 island platform)
- Tracks: 2

Construction
- Structure type: Underground
- Accessible: Yes

History
- Opened: 23 January 2021

Services
Preceding station	Shanghai Metro	Following station
Shujian Road towards Gucun Park	Line 15	Yuanjiang Road towards Zizhu Hi-tech Park
Location

Shuangbai Road (simplified Chinese: 双柏路; traditional Chinese: 雙柏路; pinyin: Shuāngbǎi Lù) is a metro station on the Line 15 of the Shanghai Metro. Located at the intersection of Shuangbai Road and South Lianhua Road in Minhang District, Shanghai, the station was scheduled to open with the rest of Line 15 in 2020. However, the station eventually opened on 23 January 2021 following a one-month postponement. Since Dec. 30, 2021, this station has become the terminal station of short-route trains, in place of West Huajing station.
