= Yongde Road station =

Shanghai Metro station

Yongde Road 永德路
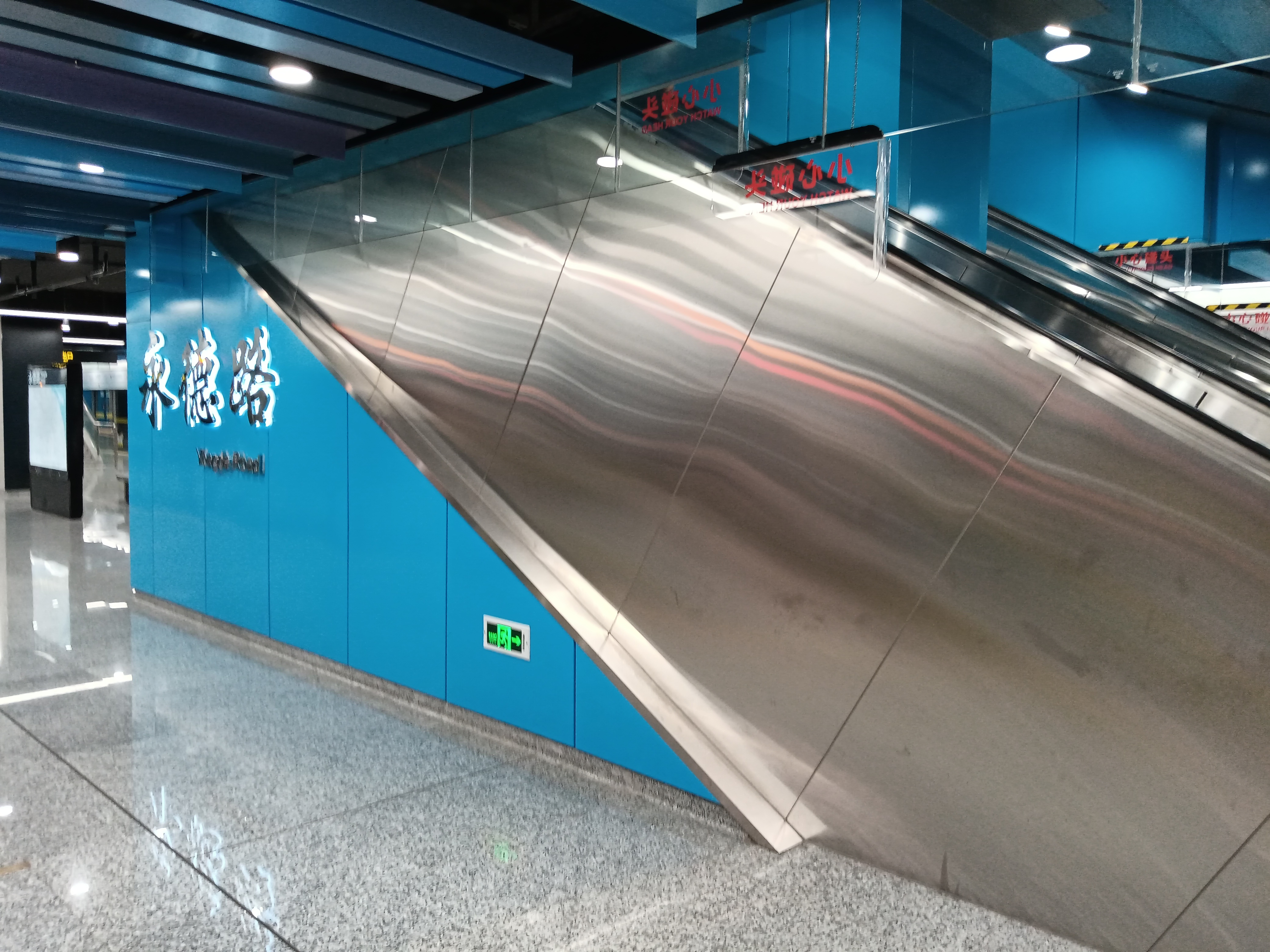
- Platform

General information
- Location: Yongde Road and South Lianhua Road, Minhang District, Shanghai; China
- Coordinates: 31.040998°N 121.438708°E
- Line: Line 15
- Platforms: 2 (1 island platform)
- Tracks: 2

Construction
- Structure type: Underground
- Accessible: Yes

History
- Opened: 23 January 2021

Services
Preceding station	Shanghai Metro	Following station
Yuanjiang Road towards Gucun Park	Line 15	Zizhu Hi-tech Park Terminus
Location

Yongde Road (Chinese: 永德路; pinyin: Yǒngdé Lù) is a metro station on the Line 15 of the Shanghai Metro. Located at the intersection of Yongde Road and South Lianhua Road in Minhang District, Shanghai, the station was scheduled to open with the rest of Line 15 in 2020. However, the station eventually opened on 23 January 2021 following a one-month postponement.
