= Line 15 (Shanghai Metro) =

Metro line in Shanghai

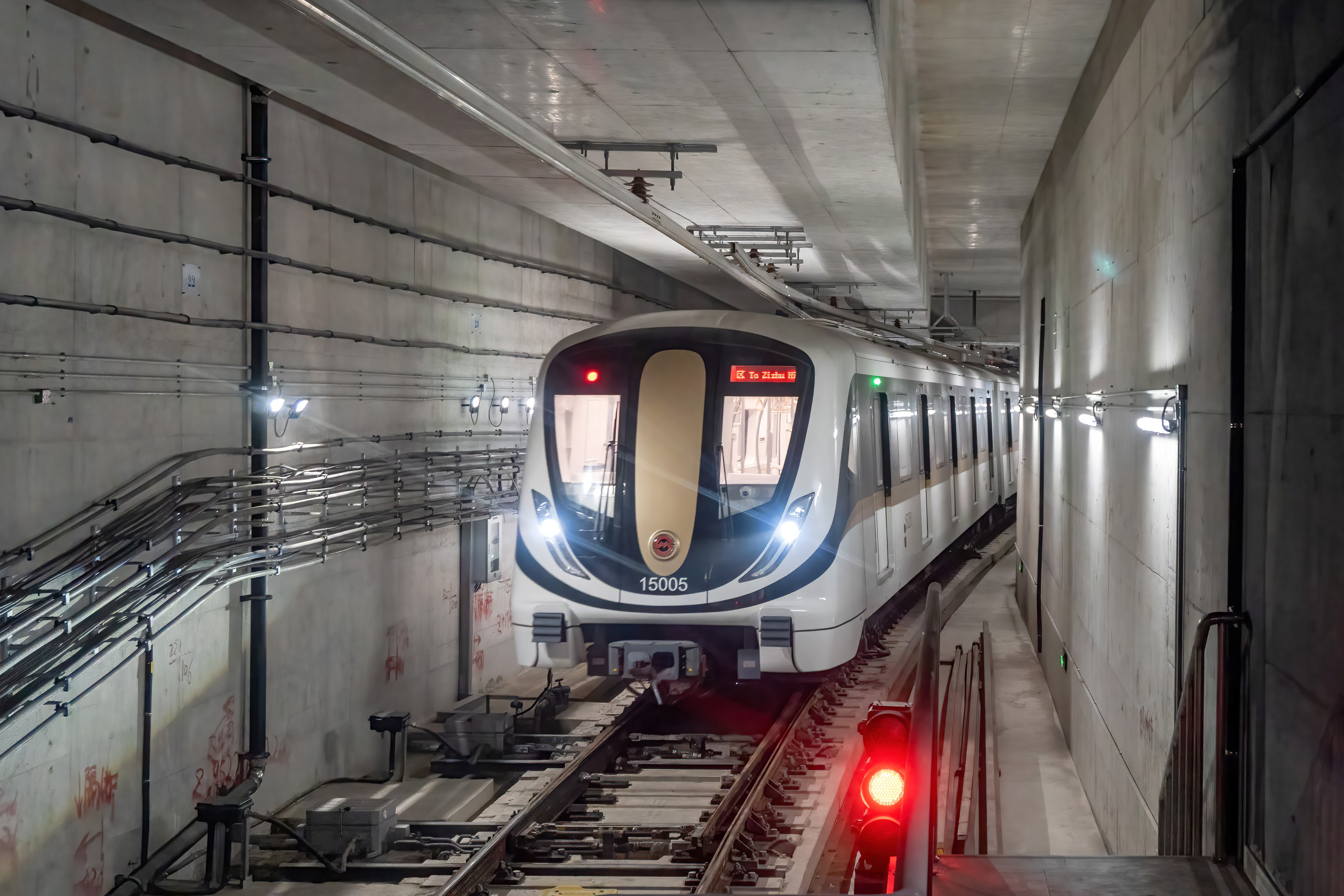
- An 15A01 train at Gucun Park station

Overview
- Other name: L1 (planned name)
- Native name: 上海地铁15号线
- Status: Operational
- Owner: Shanghai Rail Transit Line 15 Development Co., Ltd.
- Locale: Baoshan, Putuo, Changning, Minhang, and Xuhui districts, Shanghai, China
- Termini: Gucun Park; Zizhu Hi-tech Park
- Stations: 30

Service
- Type: Rapid transit
- System: Shanghai Metro
- Services: Mainline: Gucun Park ↔ Zizhu Hi-tech Park; Core: Gulang Road ↔ Shuangbai Road; Peak: Gucun Park ↔ Shuangbai Road (only operating during working day peak)
- Operator: Shanghai No. 3 Metro Operation Co. Ltd.
- Depot(s): Yuanjiang Road Depot; Chentai Road Yard
- Rolling stock: 15A01
- Daily ridership: 223,000 (2021 April average daily)

History
- Work began: August 28, 2016; 10 years ago
- Opened: January 23, 2021; 5 years ago

Technical
- Line length: 42.3 km (26.3 mi)
- Character: Underground
- Track gauge: 1,435 mm (4 ft 8 1/2 in)
- Electrification: Overhead lines 1.5kV DC
- Operating speed: 80 km (50 mi); Average speed: 33.4 km (21 mi)
- Signalling: Alstom Urbalis 400
Route map
To scale geographic map:
- Line 15

Line 15 of the Shanghai Metro is a north-south metro line in the city of Shanghai that opened on 23 January 2021. The line begins at Gucun Park in Baoshan District at its northern end, and terminates at Zizhu Hi-tech Park in Minhang District at its southern end, via Shanghai West Railway Station and Shanghai South Railway Station. It will be 42.3 kilometres (26.3 mi) in length and have 30 stations. The line is one of Shanghai Metro's new batch of high capacity fully automated and driverless lines along with Lines 14 and 18. The line is colored ivory on system maps.

== History ==
The line was originally scheduled to open by the end of 2020. However, on 24 December 2020, Shanghai Metro officials announced that the opening would take place in 2021, prior to the start of the Chinese New Year. Line 15 opened on January 23, 2021. Guilin Road station opened on June 27, 2021.

On January 19, 2021, there was a partial collapse in an under-construction Exit 9 of Zizhu Hi-tech Park station. There were no casualties at the scene, no impact on the surrounding environment, and no impact on the opening of Line 15.

Shanghai Metro Line 15 opening history
Segment	Commenced	Opened	Length	Station(s)	Name	Investment
Gucun Park - Zizhu Hi-tech Park	1 Jul 2014	23 Jan 2021	41.22 km (25.61 mi)	29	Phase 1	¥47.683 billion
Guilin Road		27 Jun 2021	Infill station	1		¥47.683 billion

On May 20, 2021, according to the official announcement, due to the accumulation of water between Loushanguan Road and East China University of Science and Technology, Line 15 will operate at a speed limit, which is expected to be delayed for more than 25 minutes.

=== Controversy ===
On 28 December 2011, the northern terminus of the line was shifted from Qihua Road station to an independent station called Jinqiu Road, located near Line 7 between Qihua and Shanghai University but with no direct interchange to Line 7. This has stirred controversy among residents over Line 15's already lack of convenient connections with other major subway lines such as Line 2 and Line 10. Planners reconsidered and extended Line 15 north of Jinqiu Road to connect with Line 7 at Gucun Park. In December 2019, the line was further revised to provide an interchange with Line 2 at Loushanguan Road station. However, there is still no interchange planned with Line 10, as the Line 15 Hongbaoshi Road station is located mid-way between Yili Road and Shuicheng Road stations on Line 10.

== Stations ==
=== Service routes ===
Shanghai Metro Line 15 service routes
M - Mainline: Gucun Park ↔ Zizhu Hi-tech Park; C - Core: Gulang Road ↔ Shuangbai Road; P - Peak: Gucun Park ↔ Shuangbai Road (only operating during working day peak)
Routes			Station name		Connections	Distance			Location	Open- ing	Plat- form
M	C	P	English	Chinese	Connections	km		min	Location	Open- ing	Plat- form
●		●	Gucun Park	顾村公园	7	0.0	0.0	0	Baoshan	23 Jan 2021	Underground island
●		●	Jinqiu Road	锦秋路		3.09	3.09	4	Baoshan	23 Jan 2021	Underground island
●		●	Fengxiang Road	丰翔路		1.21	4.30	7	Baoshan	23 Jan 2021	Underground island
●		●	Nanda Road	南大路		1.00	5.30	9	Baoshan	23 Jan 2021	Underground island
●		●	Qi'an Road	祁安路		1.40	6.70	11	Putuo	23 Jan 2021	Underground island
●	●	●	Gulang Road	古浪路		1.49	8.19	13	Putuo	23 Jan 2021	Underground side & island
●	●	●	East Wuwei Road	武威东路		0.70	8.89	15	Putuo	23 Jan 2021	Underground island
●	●	●	Shanghai West Railway Station	上海西站	11 SXH	1.63	10.52	18	Putuo	23 Jan 2021	Underground island
●	●	●	Tongchuan Road	铜川路	14	1.40	11.92	21	Putuo	23 Jan 2021	Underground island
●	●	●	North Meiling Road	梅岭北路		0.67	12.59	23	Putuo	23 Jan 2021	Underground island
●	●	●	Daduhe Road	大渡河路	13	1.42	14.02	25	Putuo	23 Jan 2021	Underground island
●	●	●	Changfeng Park	长风公园		0.88	14.90	27	Putuo	23 Jan 2021	Underground side & island
●	●	●	Loushanguan Road	娄山关路	2	1.42	16.32	29	Changning	23 Jan 2021	Underground island
●	●	●	Hongbaoshi Road	红宝石路	10 (via Yili Road) (Note: Out-of-station virtual transfer between line 15 (Hongbaoshi Road) and line 10 (Yili Road). This transfer will be counted as two separate journeys requiring two fares.)	1.37	17.69	32	Changning	23 Jan 2021	Underground island
●	●	●	Yaohong Road	姚虹路		1.71	19.50	35	Changning	23 Jan 2021	Underground island
●	●	●	Wuzhong Road	吴中路		0.86	20.36	37	Minhang	23 Jan 2021	Underground island
●	●	●	Guilin Road	桂林路	9	1.41	21.77	39	Xuhui	27 June 2021	Underground island
●	●	●	Guilin Park	桂林公园	12	0.86	22.64	41	Xuhui	23 Jan 2021	Underground island
●	●	●	Shanghai South Railway Station	上海南站	1 3 Jinshan SNH	1.86	24.50	44	Xuhui	23 Jan 2021	Underground island
●	●	●	East China University of Science and Technology	华东理工大学		1.16	25.66	47	Xuhui	23 Jan 2021	Underground island
●	●	●	Luoxiu Road	罗秀路		1.36	27.02	50	Xuhui	23 Jan 2021	Underground island
●	●	●	Zhumei Road	朱梅路		1.04	28.06	52	Xuhui	23 Jan 2021	Underground island
●	●	●	Jinghong Road (Note: Was West Huajing (华泾西))	景洪路	Airport Link	0.76	28.82	54	Xuhui	23 Jan 2021	Underground island
●	●	●	South Hongmei Road	虹梅南路		1.58	30.40	57	Minhang	23 Jan 2021	Underground island
●	●	●	Jingxi Road	景西路		1.17	31.57	59	Minhang	23 Jan 2021	Underground island
●	●	●	Shujian Road	曙建路		1.37	32.94	62	Minhang	23 Jan 2021	Underground island
●	●	●	Shuangbai Road	双柏路		0.95	33.89	64	Minhang	23 Jan 2021	Underground island
●			Yuanjiang Road	元江路		2.80	36.69	67	Minhang	23 Jan 2021	Underground island
●			Yongde Road	永德路		2.66	39.35	71	Minhang	23 Jan 2021	Underground island
●			Zizhu Hi-tech Park	紫竹高新区		1.87	41.22	74	Minhang	23 Jan 2021	Underground island
			South Lanxiang Lake Road	兰香湖南路					Minhang	South extension under construction exp 2028
			Xizha Highway (Note: Reserved station, will not open with the rest of the extension)	西闸公路					Fengxian	Reserved station
			North Huifeng Road	汇丰北路					Fengxian	South extension under construction exp 2028
			Oriental Beauty Valley Avenue	东方美谷大道					Fengxian	South extension under construction exp 2028
			Wangyuan Road	望园路	5				Fengxian	South extension under construction exp 2028

=== Future expansion ===
A south extension to Wangyuan Road to connect up with Line 5 is under construction and is expected to open in 2028.

=== Station name change ===
- On December 26, 2000 Xinlonghua was renamed as Shanghai South Railway Station (before line 15 began serving the station).
- Huajingxi station was recently changed to Jinghong Road station with the opening of the Airport Link Line.

== Headways ==
Shanghai Metro Line 15 headway
Time		Gucun Park - Gulang Road	Gulang Road - Shuangbai Road	Shuangbai Road - Zizhu Hi-tech Park
Monday - Friday (working days)
AM peak	7:20–9:20	About 4 min and 53 sec	About 3 min and 45 sec	About 6 min and 40 sec
Off-peak	9:20–16:30	About 12 min	About 6 min	About 12 min
PM peak	16:30–20:00	About 6 min	About 4 min and 45 sec	About 9 min
Other hours	Before 7:20 After 20:00	About 5 – 12 min
Saturday and Sunday (weekends)
Peak	7:00–20:20	About 12 min	About 6 min	About 12 min
Other hours	Before 7:00 After 20:20	6 – 12 min

== Technology ==
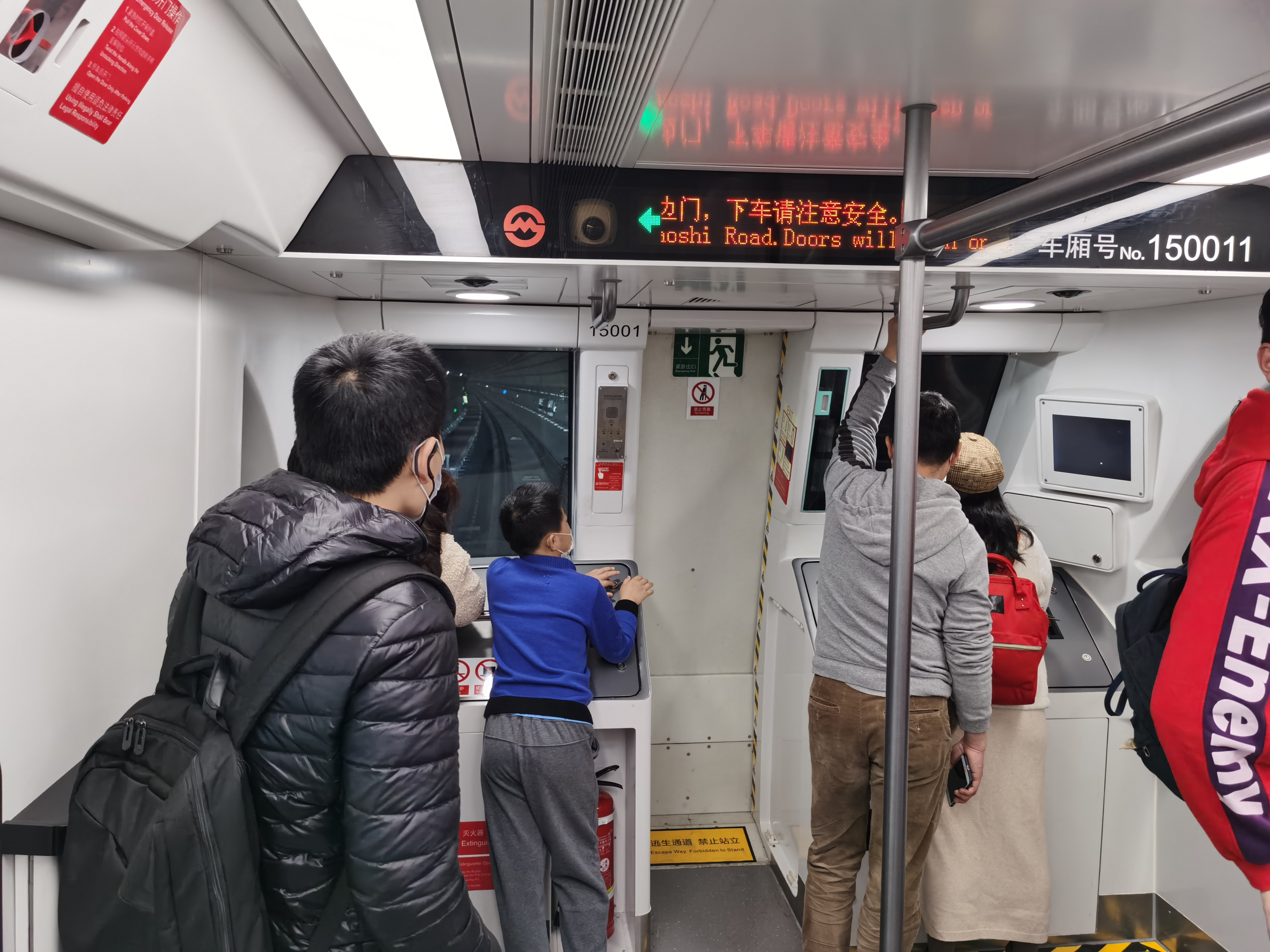
Line 15 train interior

=== Signalling ===
Line 15 is notable for being driverless and the longest line in China operating GoA4 (Grade-of-Automation 4), whereby trains may operate automatically at all times, including the actions of opening/closing doors, detecting obstacles and reacting to emergencies. There are no staff on board concerned with ongoing train operations.

Between December 2020 and January 2021, SATEE supplied its OptONIX and ONIX metro traction systems for 324 metro cars of Shanghai Line 15, with support from Xi'an Alstom Yongji Electric Equipment Co. Ltd (XAYEECO). It was also responsible for the train control monitoring system (TCMS) of Shanghai Line 15, and the line's train electrical design. During the same period, CASCO has successfully put into service its Urbalis 888 signalling solution on six of these metro lines in Chengdu and Shanghai.

=== Rolling stock ===
Shanghai Metro Line 15 rolling stock
Fleet numbers	Manufacturer	Time of manufac- turing	Class	No of car	Assembly (Note: Tc: Trailer with cab; Mp: EMU with pantograph; M: EMU without pantograph.)	Rolling stock	Number	Notes
324	SATCO (Note: SATCO (Shanghai Alstom Transportation Equipment Co., Ltd.) is a joint venture between Alstom Metropolis and Shanghai Electric.) and CRRC Changchun Railway Vehicles	2019-2020	A (Note: Class A carriage: 21-24m in length, 3.0m in width and 3.8m in height; Capacity: about 310 people.)	6	Tc+MP+M+M+MP+Tc	15A01	15001-15054 (150011-153241)	Front of the train adopts an open driver's cab.

=== Future rolling stock ===
Shanghai Metro Line 15 future rolling stock
Fleet numbers	Manufacturer	Time of manufac- turing	Class	No of car	Assembly (Note: Tc: Trailer with cab; Mp: EMU with pantograph; M: EMU without pantograph.)	Rolling stock	Number	Notes
180	TBA	2027-2028	A (Note: Class A carriage: 21-24m in length, 3.0m in width and 3.8m in height; Capacity: about 310 people.)	6	Tc+MP+M+M+MP+Tc	15A02	15055-15084 (153251-155041)
