= Zizhu Hi-tech Park station =

Shanghai Metro station

Zizhu Hi-tech Park 紫竹高新区
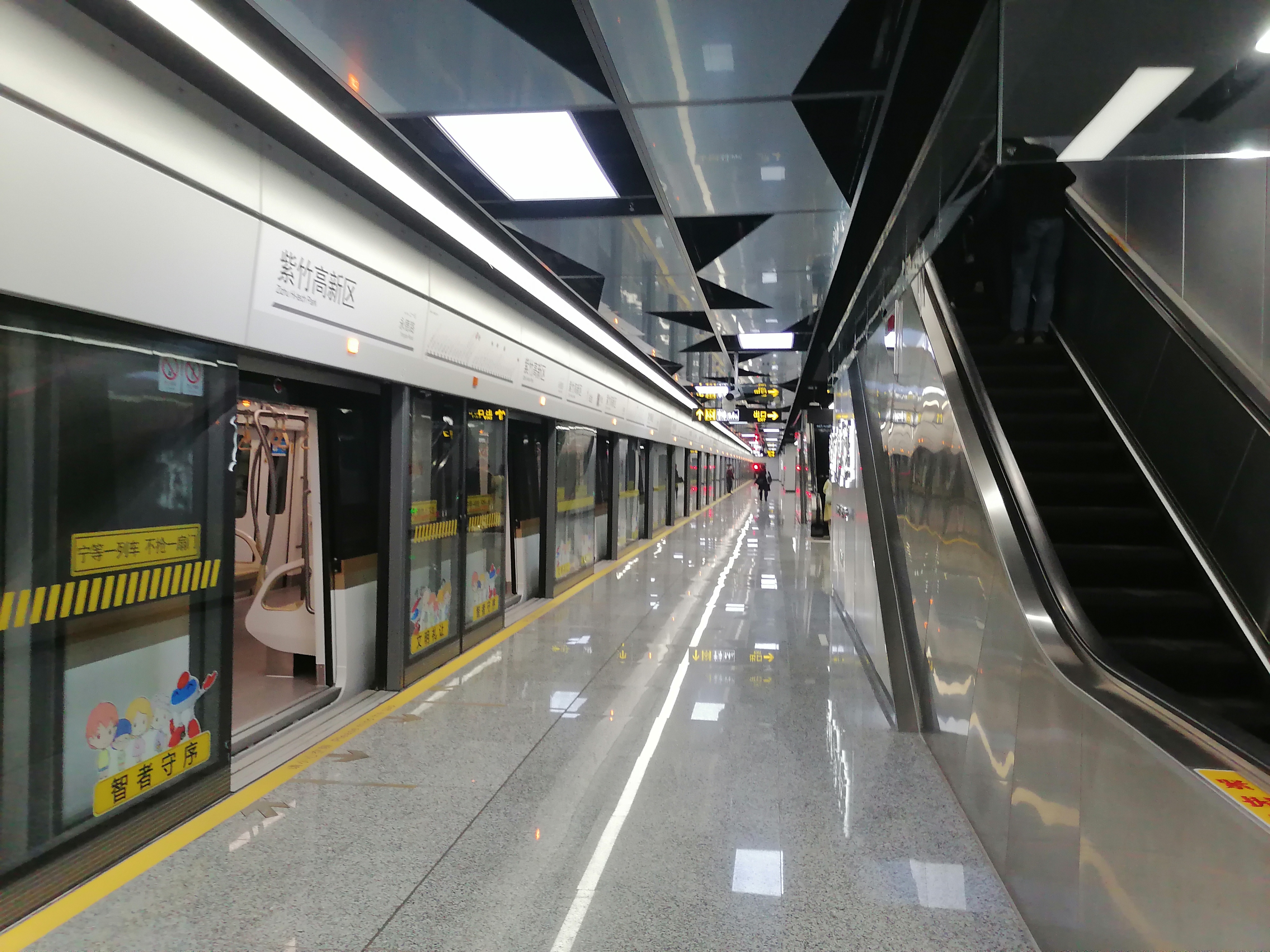
- Platform

General information
- Location: Dongchuan Road and South Lianhua Road, Minhang District, Shanghai; China
- Coordinates: 31.02588°N 121.44632°E
- Line: Line 15
- Platforms: 2 (1 island platform)
- Tracks: 2

Construction
- Structure type: Underground
- Accessible: Yes

History
- Opened: 23 January 2021

Services
Preceding station	Shanghai Metro	Following station
Yongde Road towards Gucun Park	Line 15	Terminus
Location

Zizhu Hi-tech Park (simplified Chinese: 紫竹高新区; traditional Chinese: 紫竹高新區; pinyin: Zǐzhú Gāoxīnqū) is a metro station on Line 15 of the Shanghai Metro. Located at the intersection of Dongchuan Road and South Lianhua Road in Minhang District, Shanghai, the station is the southern terminus of the line and opened with the rest of Line 15 in early 2021. The line was originally scheduled to open by the end of 2020; however, on 24 December 2020, officials announced that it would instead open before the Chinese New Year festival period in 2021. This station opened on 23 January 2021. Due to this station being the end of line, this station is the only station after South Hongmei Road where the Interior is not blue.
