= Longcao Road station =

Shanghai Metro interchange station

Longcao Road 龙漕路
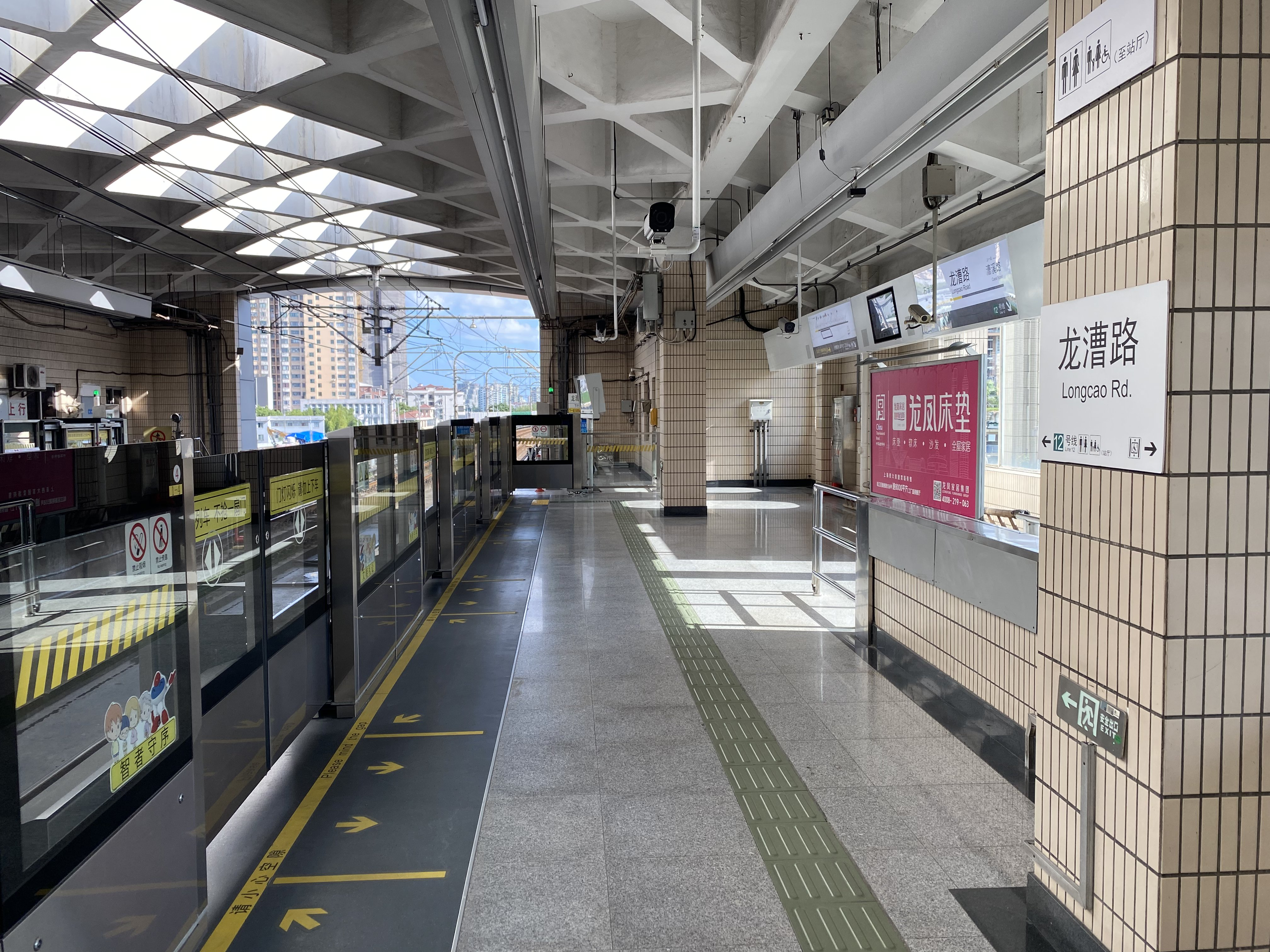
- Line 3 platform

General information
- Location: Longwu Road (龙吴路) and Longcao Road (龙漕路); Xuhui District, Shanghai; China
- Coordinates: 31°10′12″N 121°26′39″E
- Operator: Shanghai No. 3/4 Metro Operation Co. Ltd.
- Lines: Line 3; Line 12
- Platforms: 4 (1 island platform for Line 12 and 2 side platforms for Line 3)
- Tracks: 4

Construction
- Structure type: Elevated (Line 3); Underground (Line 12)
- Accessible: Yes

History
- Opened: 26 December 2000 (Line 3); 19 December 2015 (Line 12)

Services
Preceding station	Shanghai Metro	Following station
Caoxi Road towards North Jiangyang Road	Line 3	Shilong Road towards Shanghai South Railway Station
Caobao Road towards Qixin Road	Line 12	Longhua towards Jinhai Road
Location
- Location within Shanghai

Longcao Road (simplified Chinese: 龙漕路; traditional Chinese: 龍漕路; pinyin: Lóngcáo Lù) is an interchange station between Lines 3 and 12 of the Shanghai Metro. The station opened on 26 December 2000 as part of the initial section of Line 3 from Shanghai South Railway Station to Jiangwan Town. The interchange with Line 12 opened on 19 December 2015 when that line was extended southwest from Qufu Road to Qixin Road.

== Station Layout ==
2F	Side platform, doors open on the right
2F	Northbound	← Line 3 towards North Jiangyang Road (Caoxi Road)
2F	Southbound	Line 3 towards Shanghai South Railway Station (Shilong Road) →
2F	Side platform, doors open on the right
G	Line 3 Concourse	Faregates, Station Agent
G	Entrances and Exits	Exits 1-4
B1	Line 12 Concourse	Faregates, Station Agent
B2	Westbound	← Line 12 towards Qixin Road (Caobao Road)
B2	Island platform, doors open on the right
B2	Eastbound	Line 12 towards Jinhai Road (Longhua) →

== Gallery ==
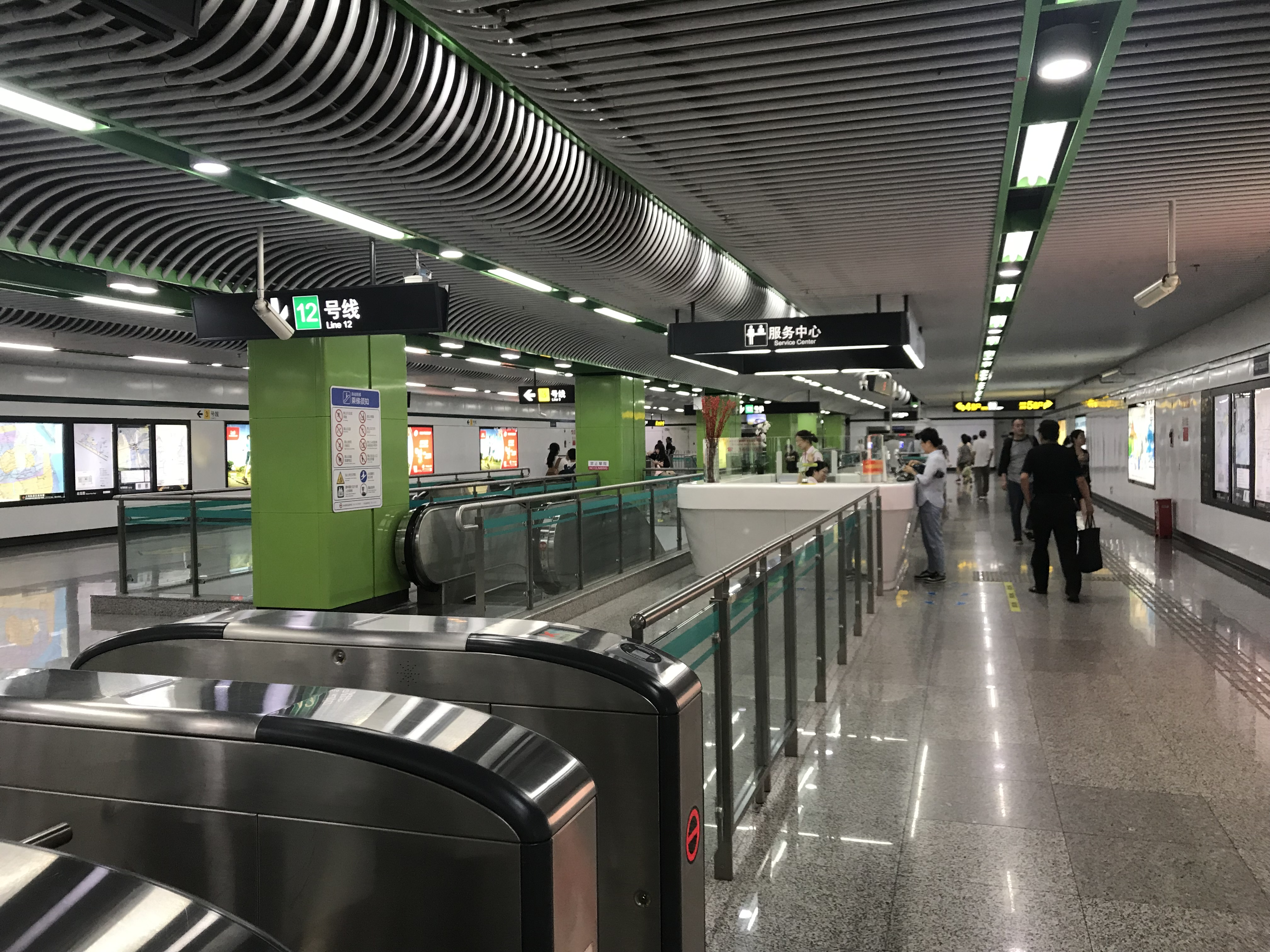
Concourse

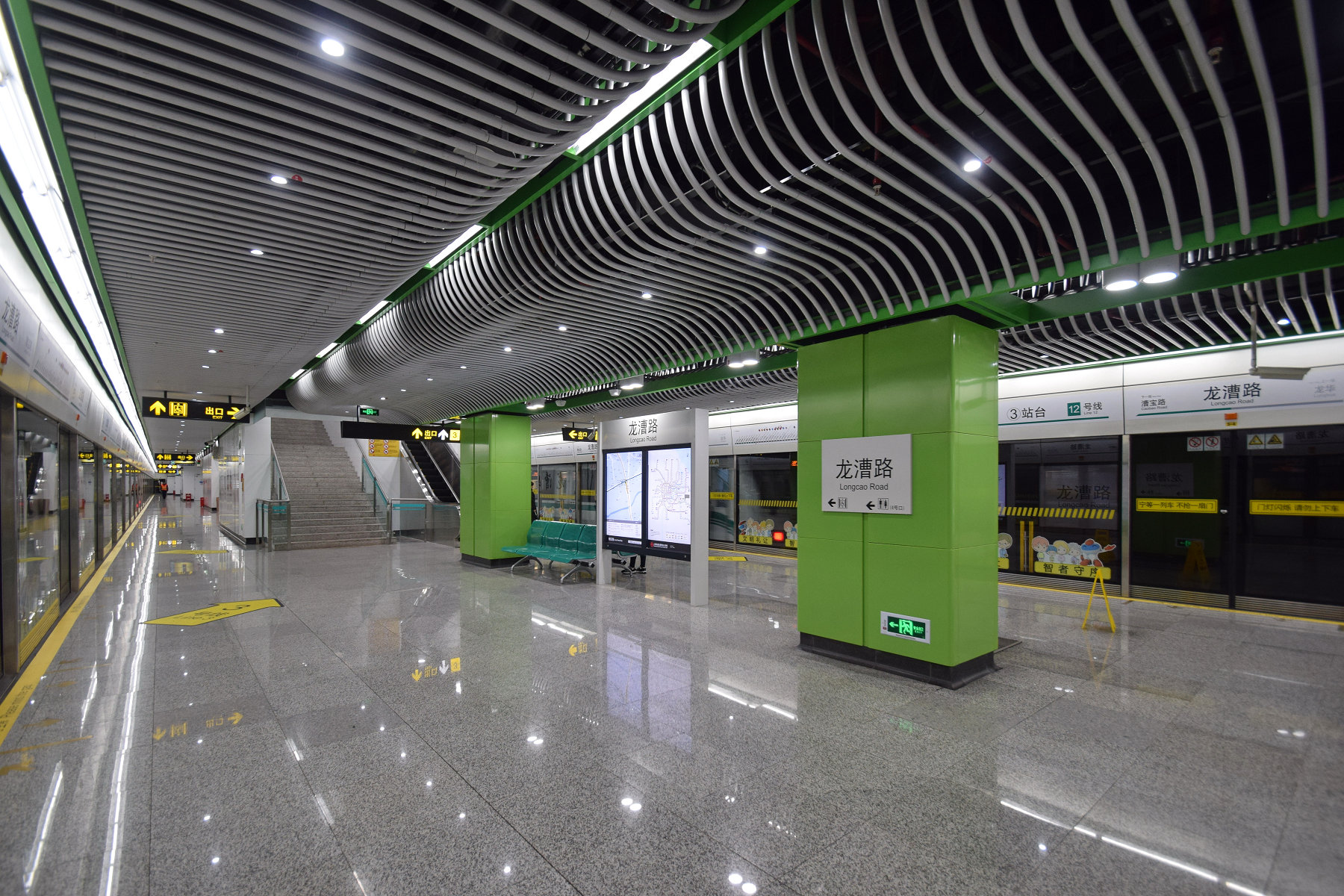
Line 12 platform

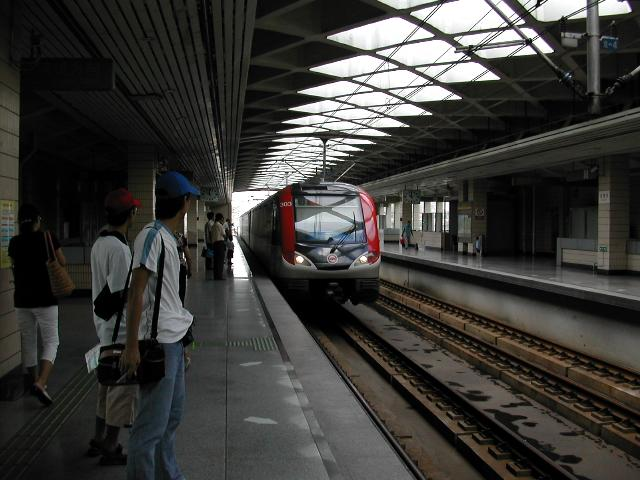
Line 3 platform in 2006
