= Guilin Park station =

Shanghai Metro station

Guilin Park 桂林公园
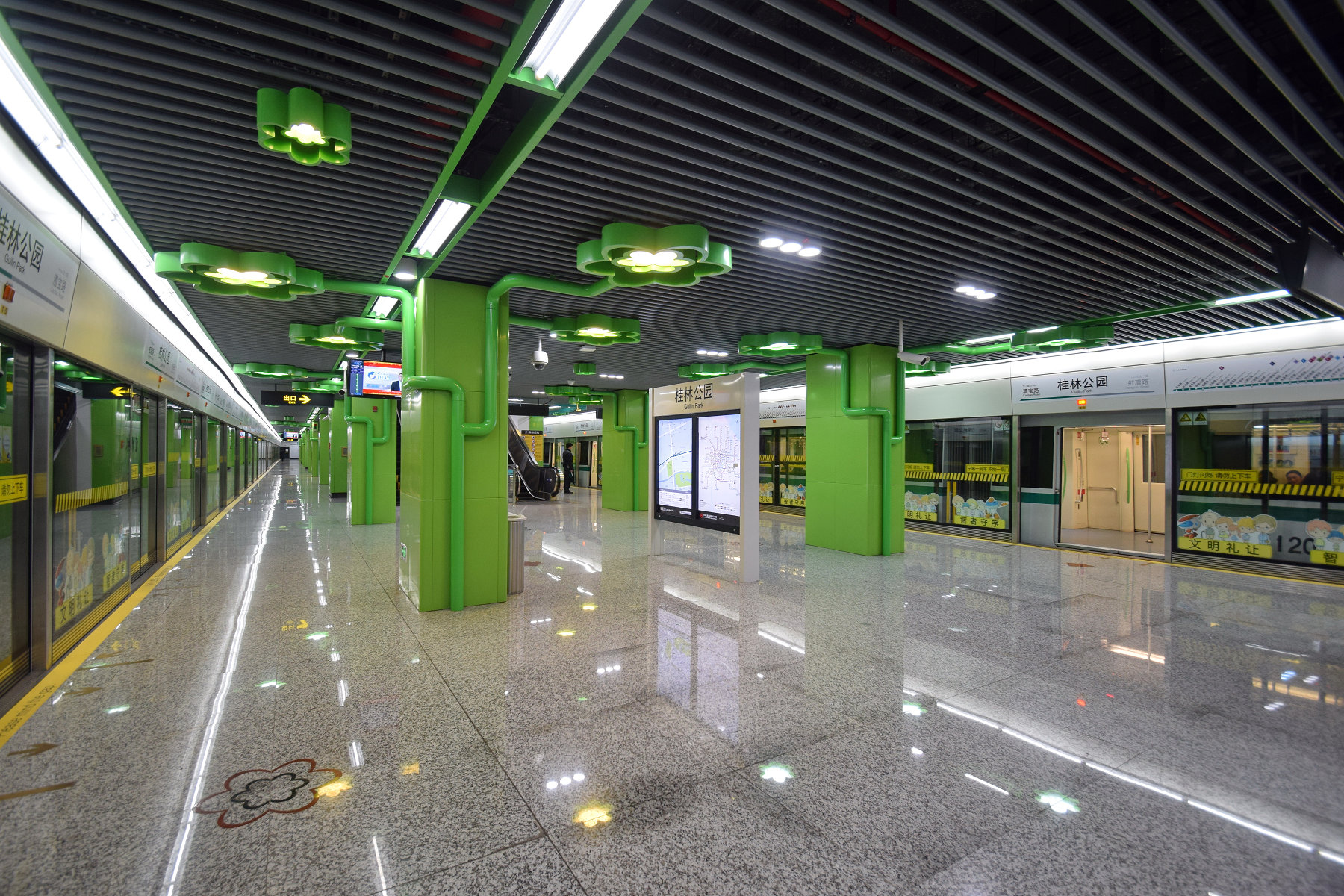
- Station platform

General information
- Location: Caobao Road and Guilin Road; Caohejing Subdistrict, Xuhui District, Shanghai; China
- Coordinates: 31°10′09″N 121°24′55″E
- Operated by: Shanghai No. 4 Metro Operation Co. Ltd.
- Lines: Line 12; Line 15
- Platforms: 4 (2 island platforms)
- Tracks: 4

Construction
- Structure type: Underground
- Accessible: Yes

History
- Opened: 19 December 2015 (Line 12); 23 January 2021 (Line 15)

Services
Preceding station	Shanghai Metro	Following station
Hongcao Road towards Qixin Road	Line 12	Caobao Road towards Jinhai Road
Guilin Road towards Gucun Park	Line 15	Shanghai South Railway Station towards Zizhu Hi-tech Park
Location

Guilin Park (simplified Chinese: 桂林公园; traditional Chinese: 桂林公園; pinyin: Guìlín Gōngyuán) is an interchange station between Line 12 and Line 15 on the Shanghai Metro and opened on 19 December 2015. It became an interchange station between Line 12 and Line 15 with the opening of the latter line on 23 January 2021.

== Station layout ==
1F	Ground level	Exits
B1	Line 12 concourse	Tickets, Service Center
B1	Line 15 concourse	Tickets, Service Center
B2	Platform 1	← Line 12 towards Qixin Road (Hongcao Road)
B2	Island platform, doors open on the left
B2	Platform 2	Line 12 towards Jinhai Road (Caobao Road) →
B3	Platform 4	← Line 15 towards Gucun Park (Guilin Road)
B3	Island platform, doors open on the left
B3	Platform 3	Line 15 towards Zizhu Hi-tech Park (Shanghai South Railway Station) →

=== Entrances/exits ===
Guilin Park has four exits. Exits 1 and 4 connect line 12, exits 5 and 6 connect line 15.

- 1: Caobao Road
- 4: Caobao Road, Guilin Road
- 5: Guilin Road, Caobao Road, Guilin Park
- 6: Guilin Road, Tianlin Road

== Gallery ==
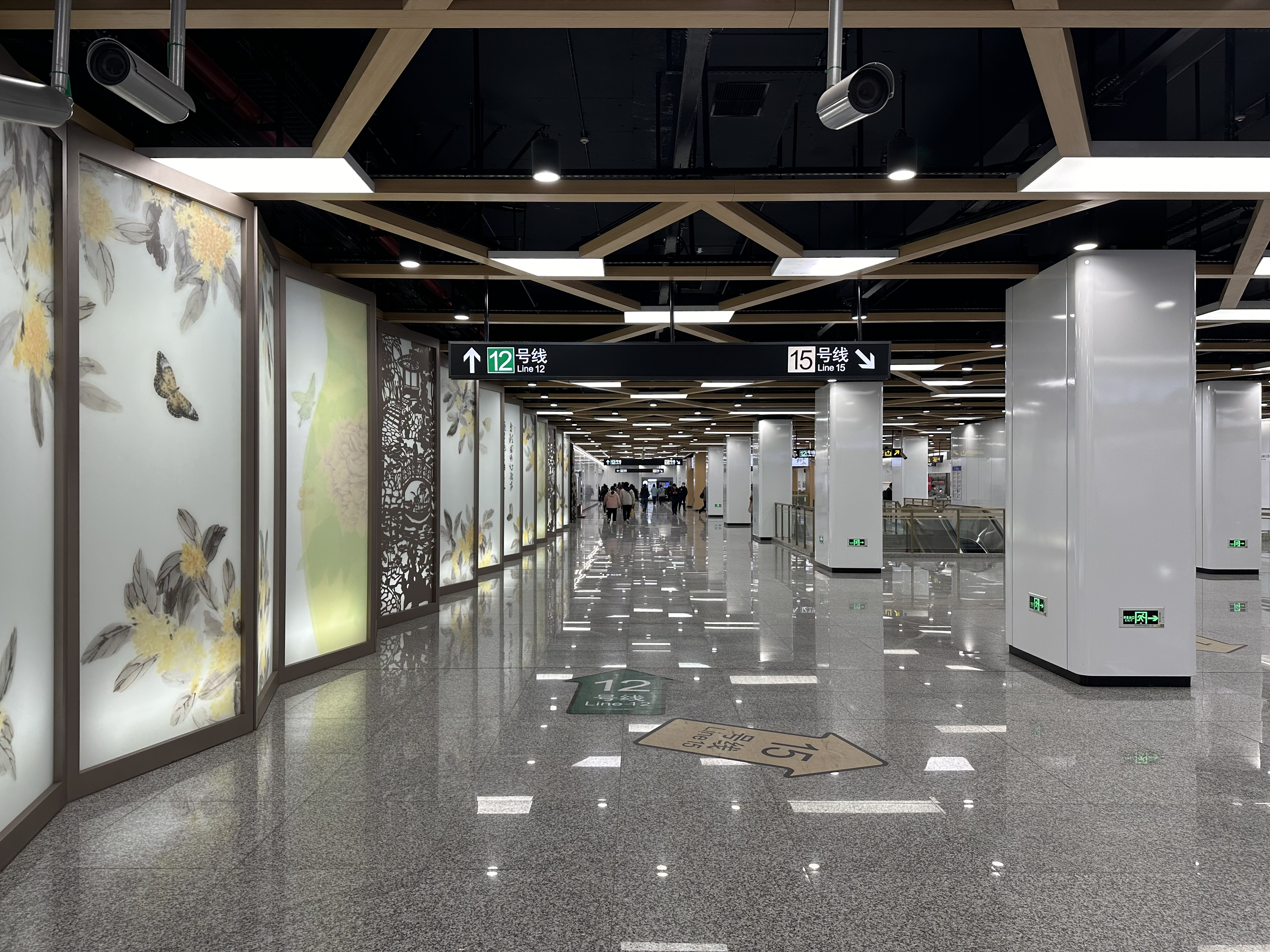
Line 15 Concourse

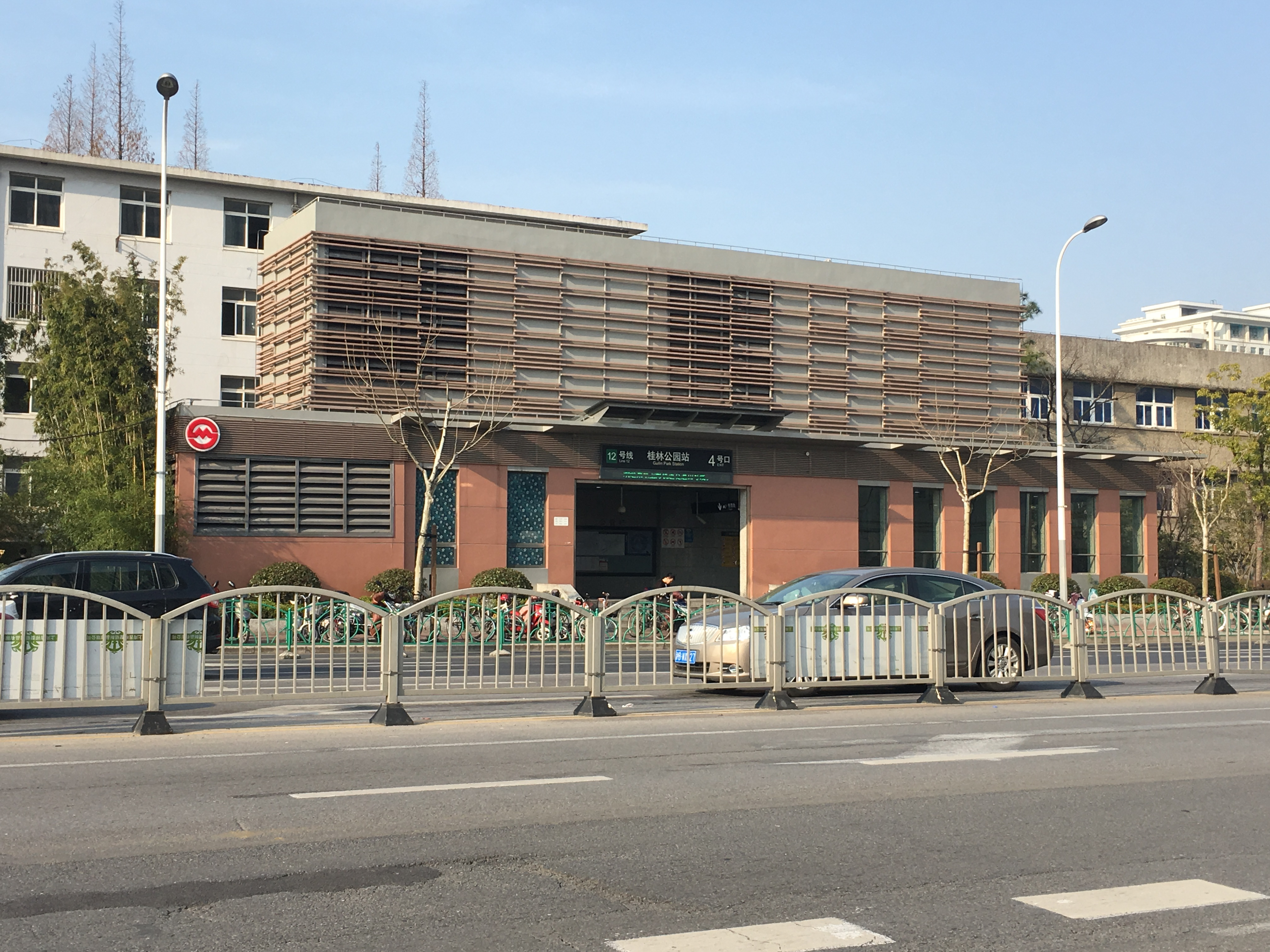
Exit 4 in 2018

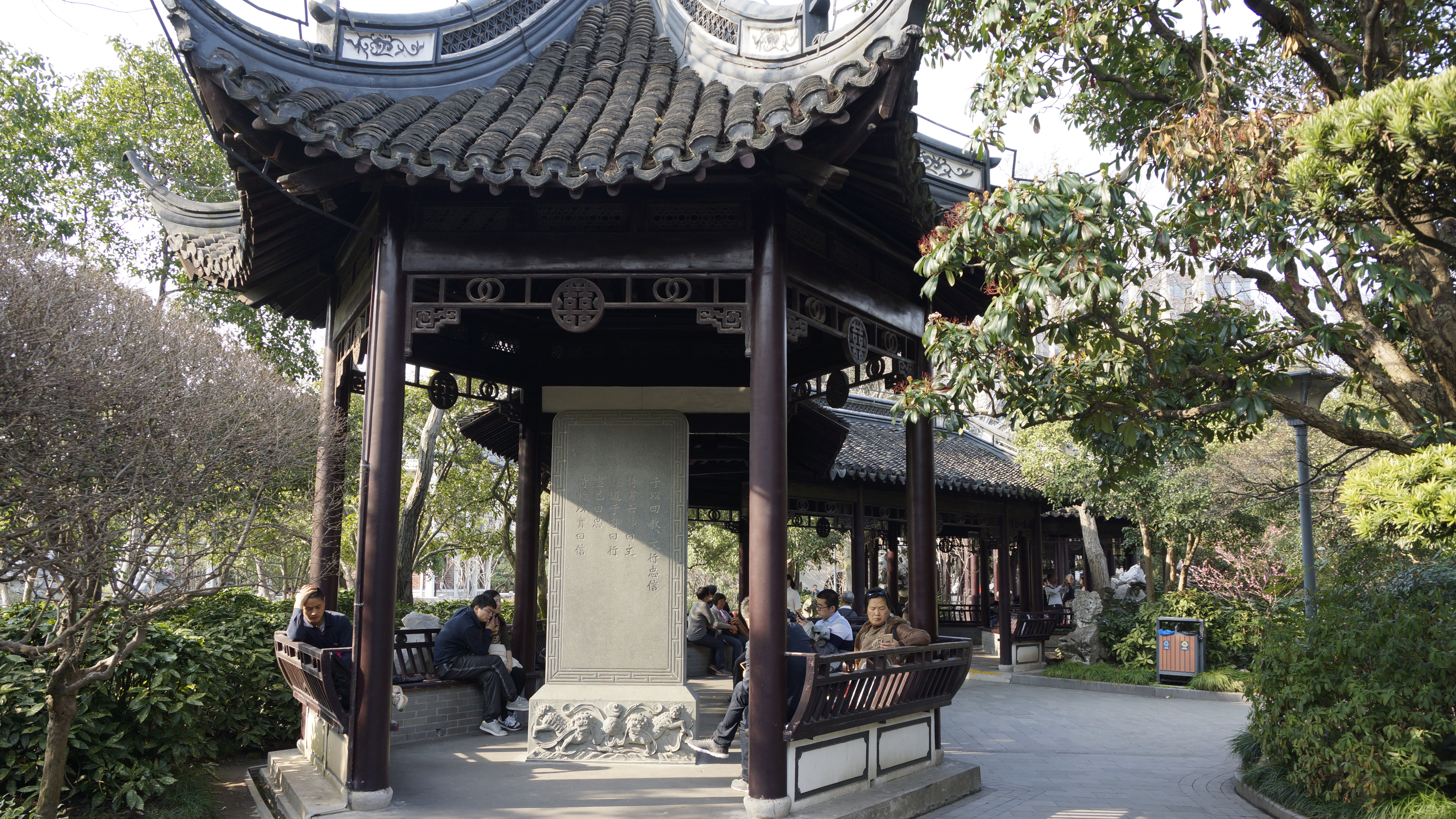
Guilin Park near the metro station
