= International Cruise Terminal station =

Shanghai Metro station

International Cruise Terminal 国际客运中心
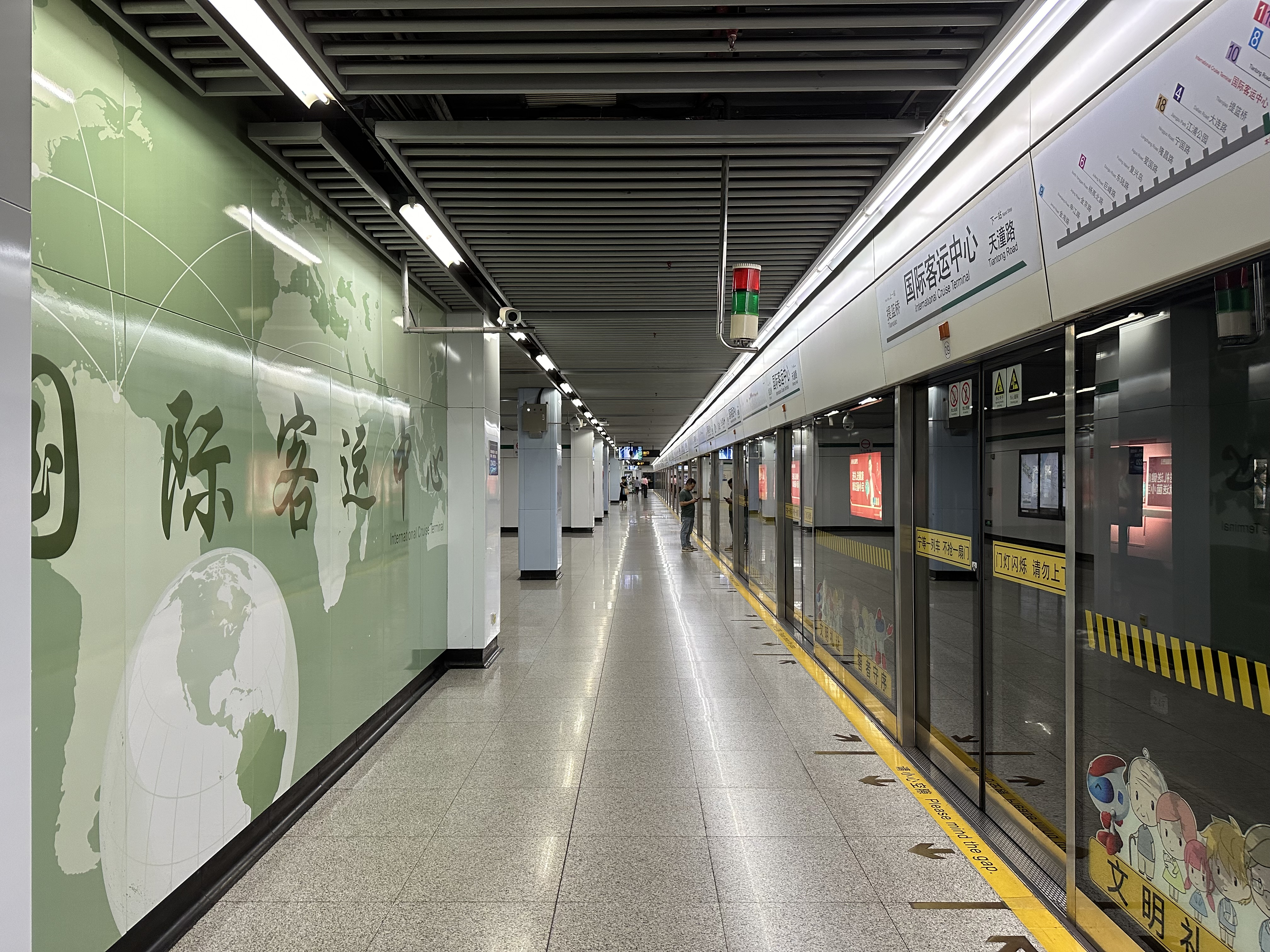
- Station platform

General information
- Location: East Changzhi Road and Lüshun Road (旅顺路); Hongkou District, Shanghai; China
- Coordinates: 31°15′07″N 121°29′37″E
- Line: Line 12
- Platforms: 2 (2 side platforms)
- Tracks: 2

Construction
- Structure type: Underground
- Accessible: Yes

History
- Opened: 29 December 2013

Services
Preceding station	Shanghai Metro	Following station
Tiantong Road towards Qixin Road	Line 12	Tilanqiao towards Jinhai Road
Location

International Cruise Terminal (simplified Chinese: 国际客运中心; traditional Chinese: 國際客運中心; pinyin: Guójì Kèyùn Zhōngxīn) is a station on the Shanghai Metro Line 12, which opened 29 December 2013.

== Exits ==
- 1: Dong Changzhi Road, Shangqiu Road
- 4: Dong Changzhi Road, Shangqiu Road

== Nearby ==
- White Magnolia Plaza

== See also ==
- International Cruise Terminal Station, Mumbai
