= Fuxing Island station =

Shanghai Metro station

Fuxing Island 复兴岛
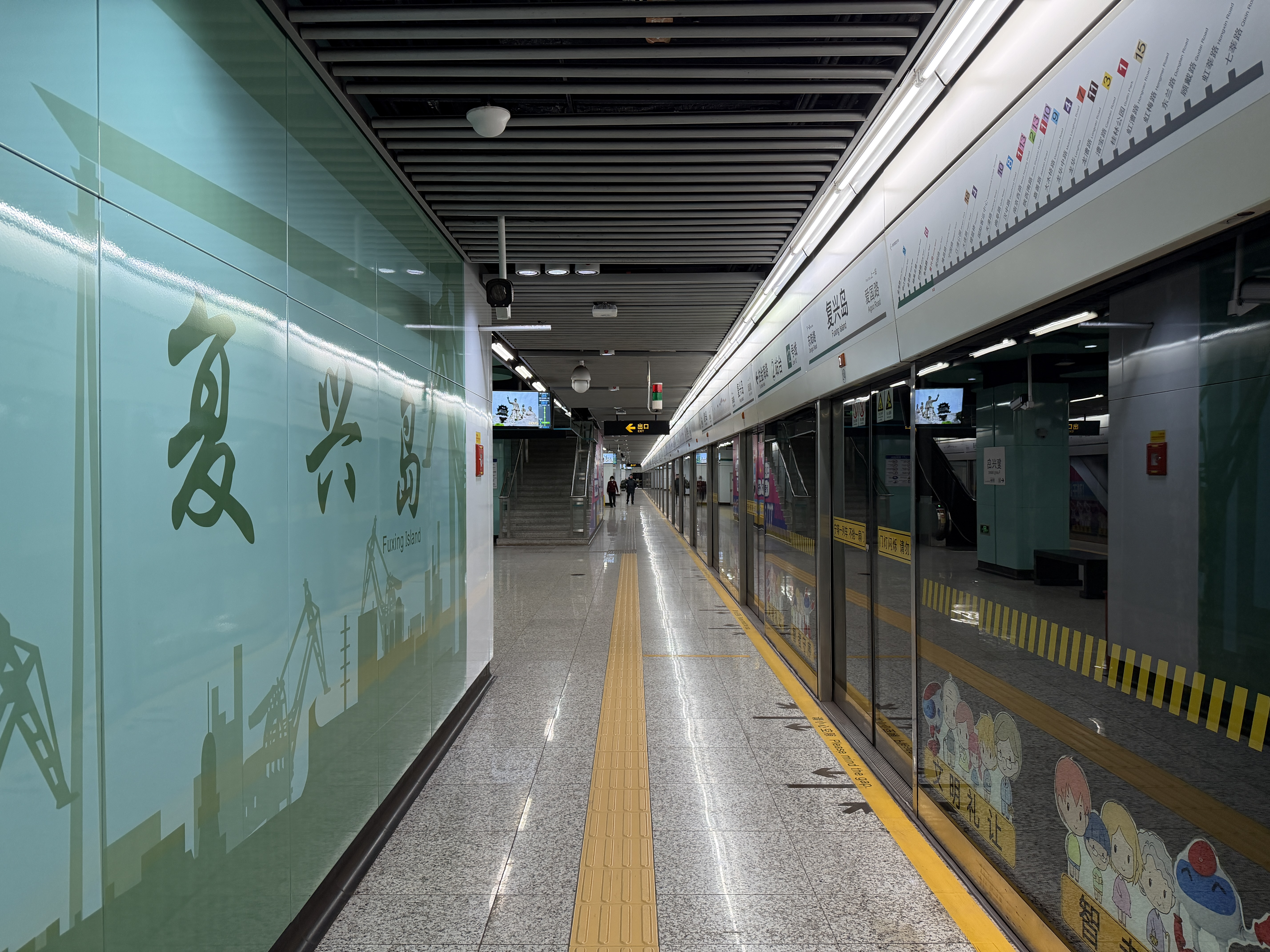
- Station platform

General information
- Location: Gongqing Road; Fuxing Island, Yangpu District, Shanghai; China
- Coordinates: 31.282987°N 121.55704°E
- Line: Line 12
- Platforms: 2 (1 island platform)
- Tracks: 2

Construction
- Structure type: Underground
- Accessible: Yes

History
- Opened: 29 December 2013

Services
Preceding station	Shanghai Metro	Following station
Aiguo Road towards Qixin Road	Line 12	Donglu Road towards Jinhai Road
Location

Fuxing Island (simplified Chinese: 复兴岛; traditional Chinese: 復興島; pinyin: Fùxīng Dǎo) is a Shanghai Metro station located on Line 12 within Fuxing Island, a part of Yangpu District, Shanghai. The station opened on 29 December 2013.

== History ==
The station opened for passenger operations on 29 December 2013, as part of an initial fifteen station-long segment of Line 12 between Tiantong Road and Jinhai Road stations.

== Description ==
An underground structure with a single island platform, the station is located along Gongqing Road, the main roadway that serves the island. The island, also formerly known as Point Island, is located in the Huangpu River and is separated from the west bank by the Fuxing Island canal.

Due to its proximity to the Huangpu River, including the Zhujiamen wharf and Hudong shipyard on the other side of the river in Pudong, it lies on one of the deepest tunnel sections in the Shanghai Metro system. The platform is located on the fourth underground floor, with the third floor used for equipment, second floor used as the station concourse, and first floor used for shops. The tunnel depth is due to the fact that the line must pass under the flood wall foundations of the shipyard and wharf.

=== Exits and amenities ===
There are three exits, numbered 2 through 4, of which only two exits are open. Exit 2 is located on the east side of the station, close to Gongqing Road, while exit 4 is located on the west side of the station, facing the Fuxing Island canal. Washrooms are available outside the fare-paid zone, near exit 2. The station is fully accessible.

=== Places nearby ===
- Fuxing Island Park
