= Longhua station (Shanghai Metro) =

Shanghai Metro interchange station

Longhua 龙华
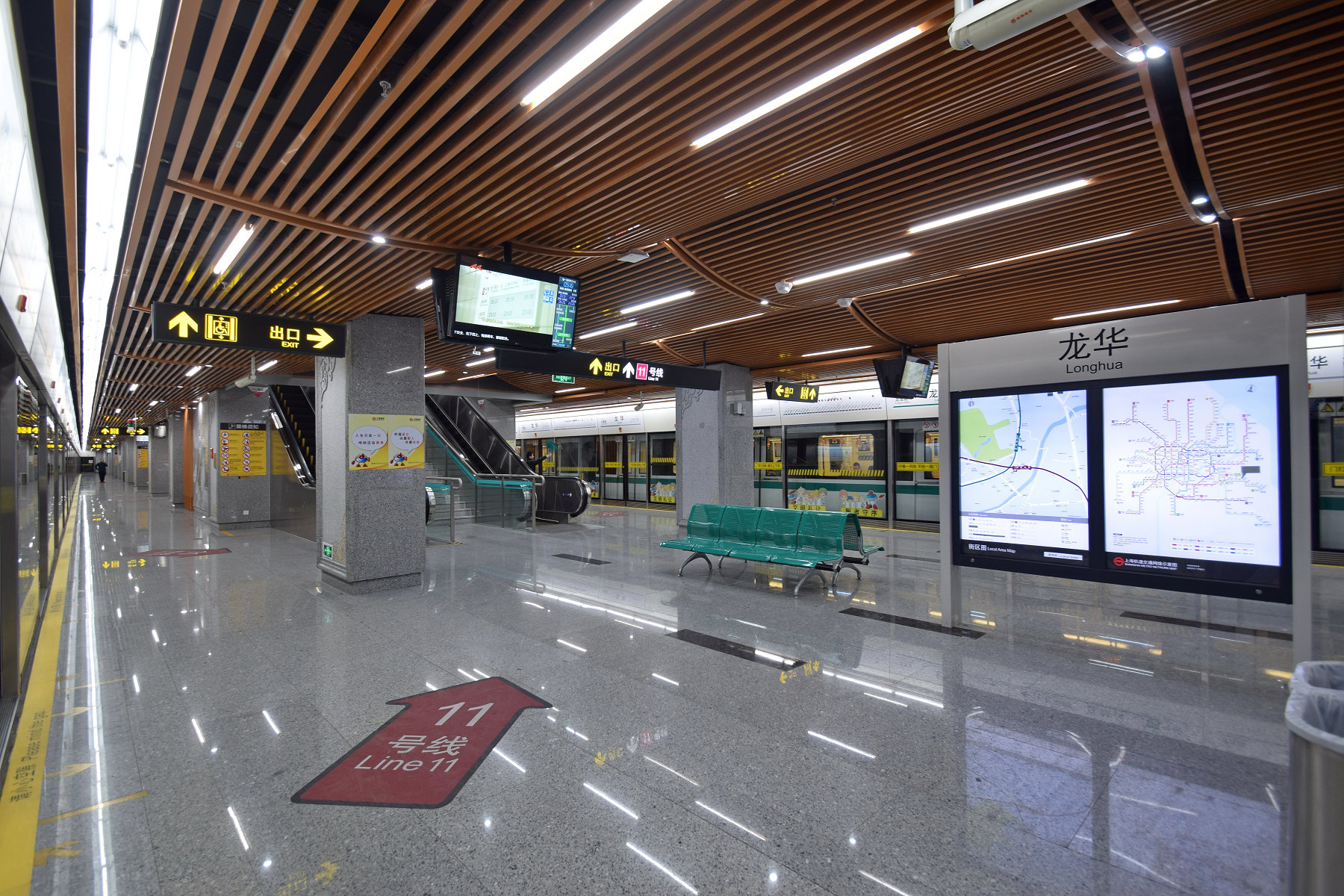
- Line 12 platform

General information
- Location: Longhua Road (龙华路); Longhua Subdistrict, Xuhui District, Shanghai; China
- Coordinates: 31.1724°N 121.4524°E
- Operator: Shanghai No. 2/4 Metro Operation Co. Ltd.
- Lines: Line 11; Line 12
- Platforms: 4 (2 island platforms)
- Tracks: 4

Construction
- Structure type: Underground
- Accessible: Yes

History
- Opened: 31 August 2013 (Line 11); 19 December 2015 (Line 12)

Services
| Preceding station | Shanghai Metro | Following station |
|---|---|---|
| Shanghai Swimming Center towards North Jiading or Huaqiao | Line 11 | Yunjin Road towards Disney Resort |
| Longcao Road towards Qixin Road | Line 12 | Middle Longhua Road towards Jinhai Road |
Location
- Location within Shanghai

Longhua (simplified Chinese: 龙华; traditional Chinese: 龍華; pinyin: Lónghuá) is an interchange station between Line 11 and Line 12 of the Shanghai Metro. It opened on 31 August 2013 as a station for Line 11. On 19 December 2015, the section of Line 12 including this station opened.

== Station layout ==
| 1F | Ground level | Exits |
| B1 | Line 12 concourse | Tickets, Service Center, Convenient stores |
| B2 | Platform 3 | ← Line 12 towards Qixin Road (Longcao Road) |
| B2 | Island platform, doors open on the left |
| B2 | Platform 4 | Line 12 towards Jinhai Road (Middle Longhua Road) → |
| B2 | Line 11 concourse | Tickets, Service Center, Convenient stores |
| B3 | Platform 1 | ← Line 11 towards North Jiading or Huaqiao (Shanghai Swimming Center) |
| B3 | Island platform, doors open on the left |
| B3 | Platform 2 | Line 11 towards Disney Resort (Yunjin Road) → |

=== Entrances/exits ===
- 1: Longhua Road
- 2: Longhua Road, Longhua Road (W)
- 3: Longhua Road
- 4: Longhua Road
- 5: Longhua Road, Houmalu Road
