= Hongcao Road station =

Shanghai Metro station

Hongcao Road 虹漕路
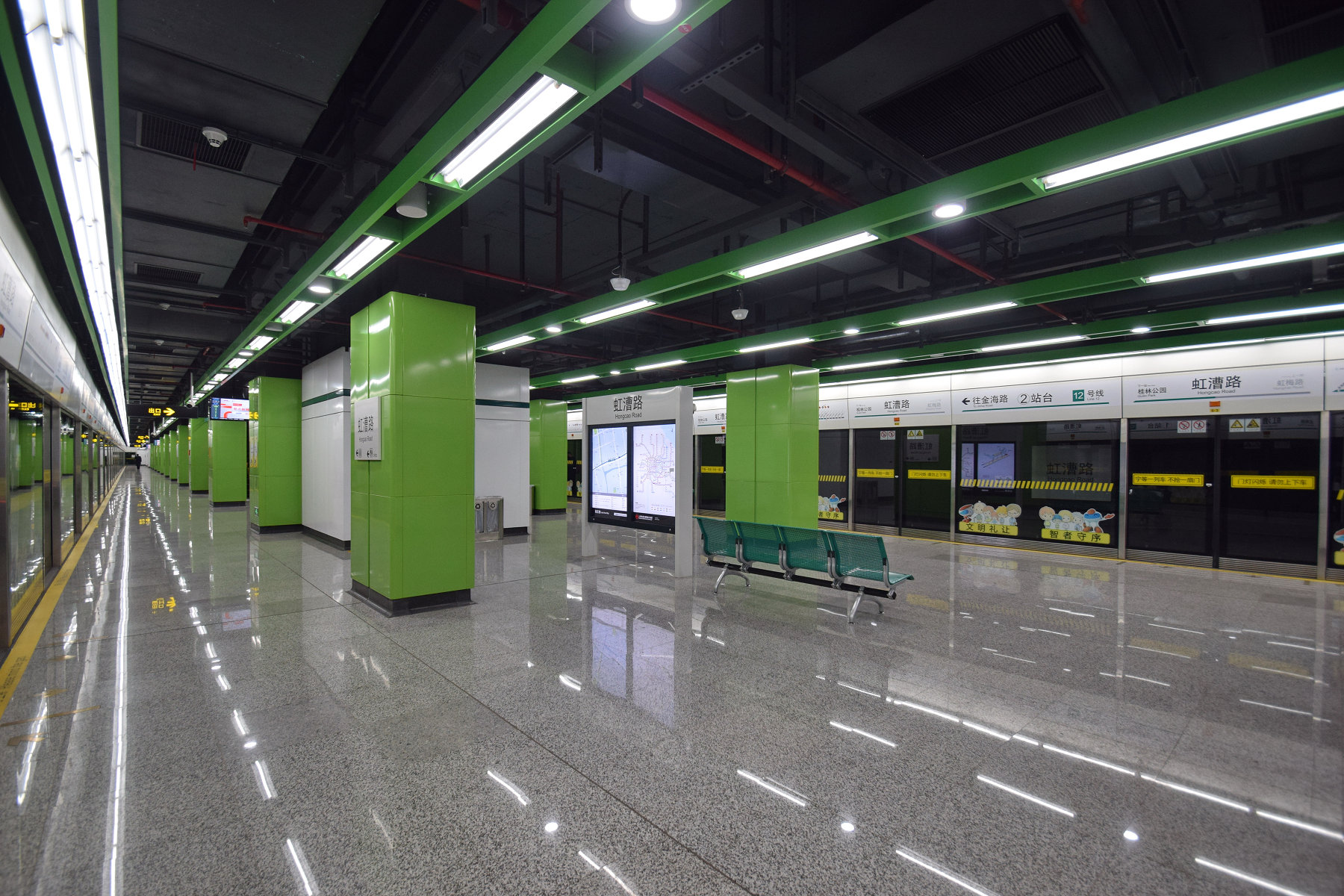
- Station platform

General information
- Location: Caobao Road and Hongcao Road (虹漕路); Caohejing Subdistrict, Xuhui District, Shanghai; China
- Coordinates: 31°09′57″N 121°24′21″E
- Operated by: Shanghai No. 4 Metro Operation Co. Ltd.
- Line: Line 12
- Platforms: 2 (1 island platform)
- Tracks: 2

Construction
- Structure type: Underground
- Accessible: Yes

History
- Opened: December 19, 2015

Services
| Preceding station | Shanghai Metro | Following station |
|---|---|---|
| Hongmei Road towards Qixin Road | Line 12 | Guilin Park towards Jinhai Road |
Location

Hongcao Road (Chinese: 虹漕路; pinyin: Hóngcáo Lù) is a station on the Shanghai Metro, which services Line 12 and opened on December 19, 2015.
