= Tilanqiao station =

Shanghai Metro station

Tilanqiao 提篮桥
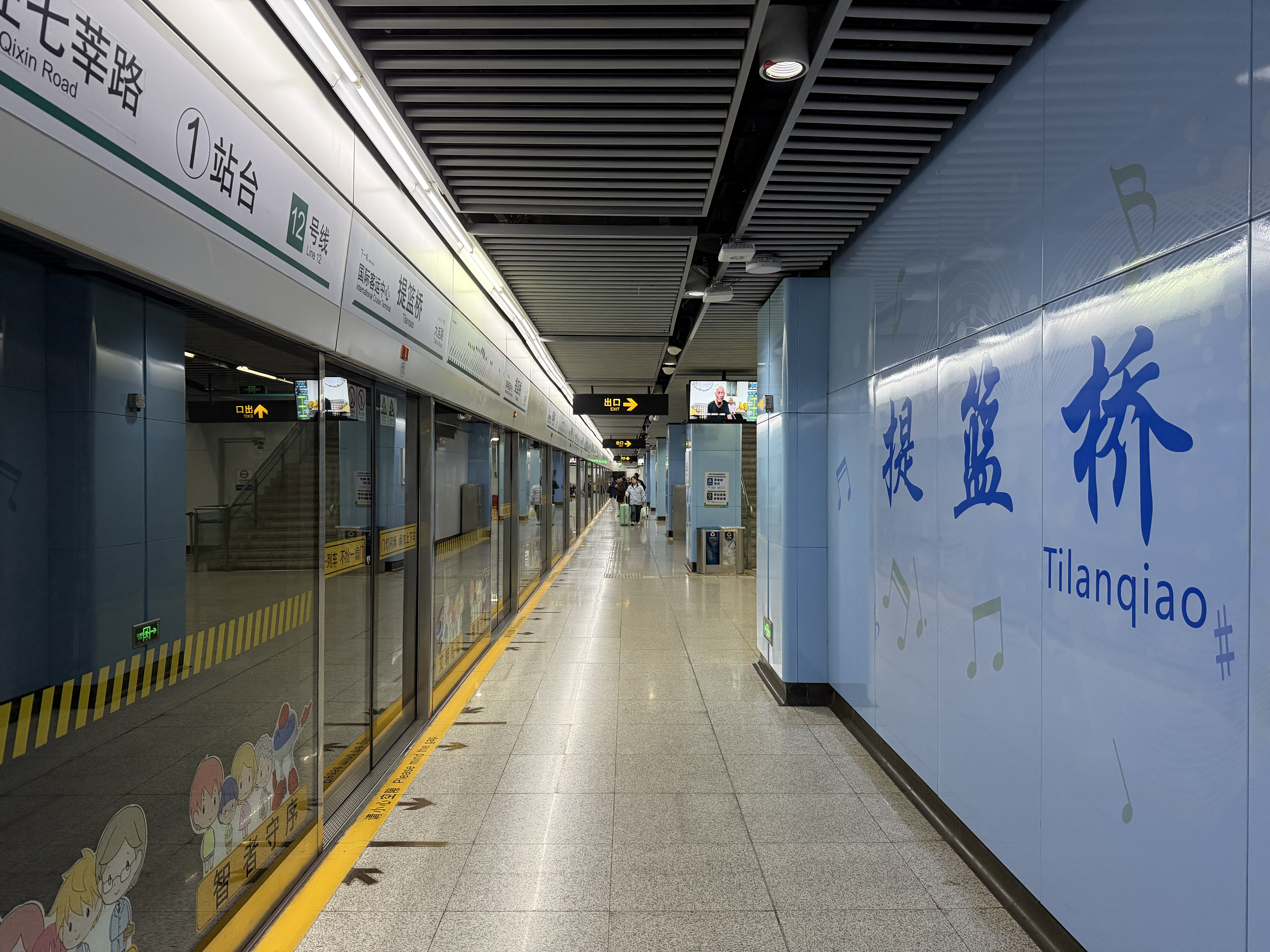
- Station platform

General information
- Location: East Changzhi Road and Gongping Road (公平路); Tilanqiao, Hongkou District, Shanghai; China
- Coordinates: 31.25556°N 121.50234°E
- Line: Line 12
- Platforms: 2 (1 island platform)
- Tracks: 2
- Connections: Bus routes 13 and 854 (at Dongchangzhi Road & Gongping Road Terminal)

Construction
- Structure type: Underground
- Accessible: Yes

History
- Opened: 29 December 2013

Services
Preceding station	Shanghai Metro	Following station
International Cruise Terminal towards Qixin Road	Line 12	Dalian Road towards Jinhai Road
Location

Tilanqiao (simplified Chinese: 提篮桥; traditional Chinese: 提籃橋; pinyin: Tílánqiáo; Shanghainese: dhilejhiao [dìlᴇ̋dʑiɔ᷆]) is a station on Line 12 of the Shanghai Metro, which opened on 29 December 2013.
