= Caobao Road station =

Shanghai Metro interchange station

Caobao Road 漕宝路
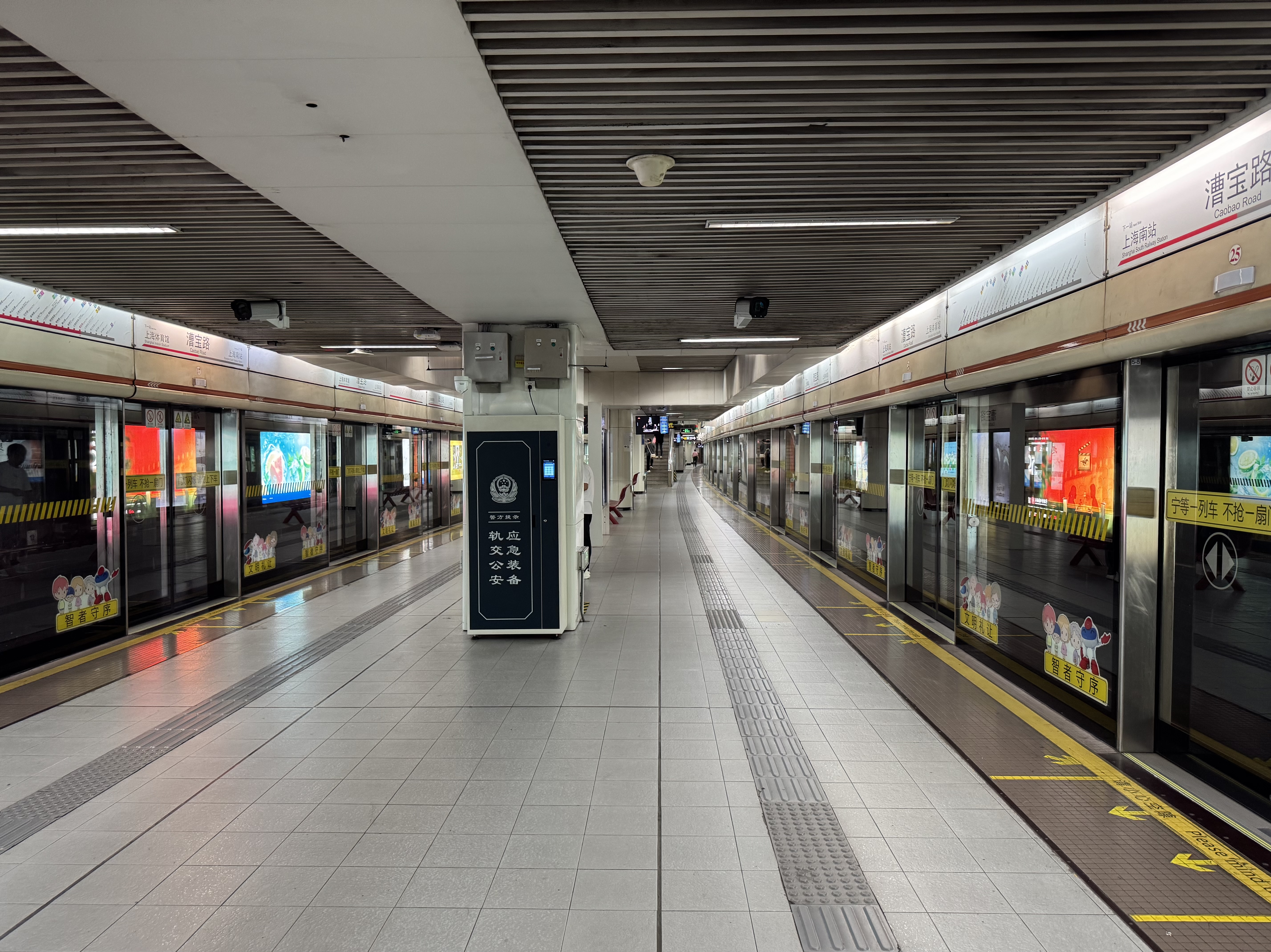
- Line 1 platform

General information
- Location: Caobao Road; Xuhui District, Shanghai; China
- Coordinates: 31°10′06″N 121°25′59″E
- Operator: Shanghai No. 1/4 Metro Operation Co. Ltd.
- Lines: Line 1; Line 12
- Platforms: 4 (2 island platforms)
- Tracks: 4

Construction
- Structure type: Underground
- Accessible: Yes

Other information
- Station code: L01/06 (Line 1)

History
- Opened: 28 May 1993 (Line 1); 19 December 2015 (Line 12)

Services
Preceding station	Shanghai Metro	Following station
Shanghai Indoor Stadium towards Fujin Road	Line 1	Shanghai South Railway Station towards Xinzhuang
Guilin Park towards Qixin Road	Line 12	Longcao Road towards Jinhai Road
Location
- Location within Shanghai

Caobao Road (Chinese: 漕宝路; pinyin: Cáobǎo Lù) is an interchange station between Line 1 and Line 12 of the Shanghai Metro. This station is part of the initial southern section of the line that opened on 28 May 1993 and is located in Xuhui District. The station became an interchange station with the arrival of Line 12 which entered operation on 19 December 2015. This station has been rumored to be haunted.

== Station Layout ==
G	Entrances and Exits	Exits 1-10
B1	Line 1 Concourse	Faregates, Station Agent
B2	Line 12 Concourse	Faregates, Station Agent
B2	Northbound	← Line 1 towards Fujin Road (Shanghai Indoor Stadium)
B2	Island platform, doors open on the left
B2	Southbound	Line 1 towards Xinzhuang (Shanghai South Railway Station) →
B3	Westbound	← Line 12 towards Qixin Road (Guilin Park)
B3	Island platform, doors open on the left
B3	Eastbound	Line 12 towards Jinhai Road (Longcao Road) →
