= Gudai Road station =

Shanghai Metro station

Gudai Road 顾戴路
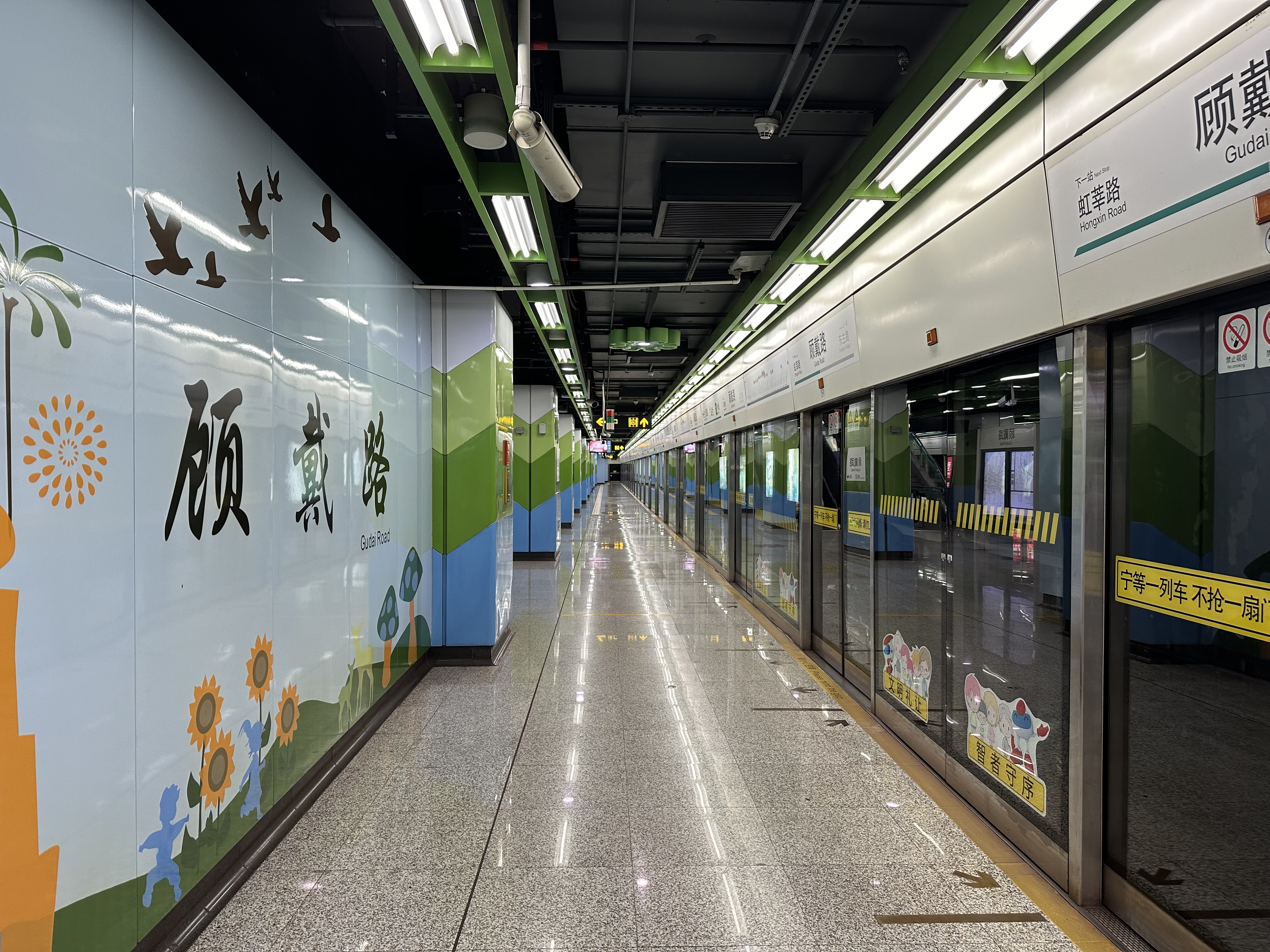
- Platform

General information
- Location: Gudai Road (顾戴路) and Hechuan Road (合川路); Minhang District, Shanghai; China
- Coordinates: 31.14322°N 121.38741°E
- Operated by: Shanghai No. 4 Metro Operation Co. Ltd.
- Line: Line 12
- Platforms: 2 (1 island platform)
- Tracks: 2

Construction
- Structure type: Underground
- Accessible: Yes

History
- Opened: December 19, 2015

Services
Preceding station	Shanghai Metro	Following station
Hongxin Road towards Qixin Road	Line 12	Donglan Road towards Jinhai Road
Location

Gudai Road (Chinese: 顾戴路; pinyin: Gùdài Lù) is a station on the Shanghai Metro, which services Line 12 and opened on December 19, 2015.
