= Donglu Road station =

Shanghai Metro station

Donglu Road 东陆路
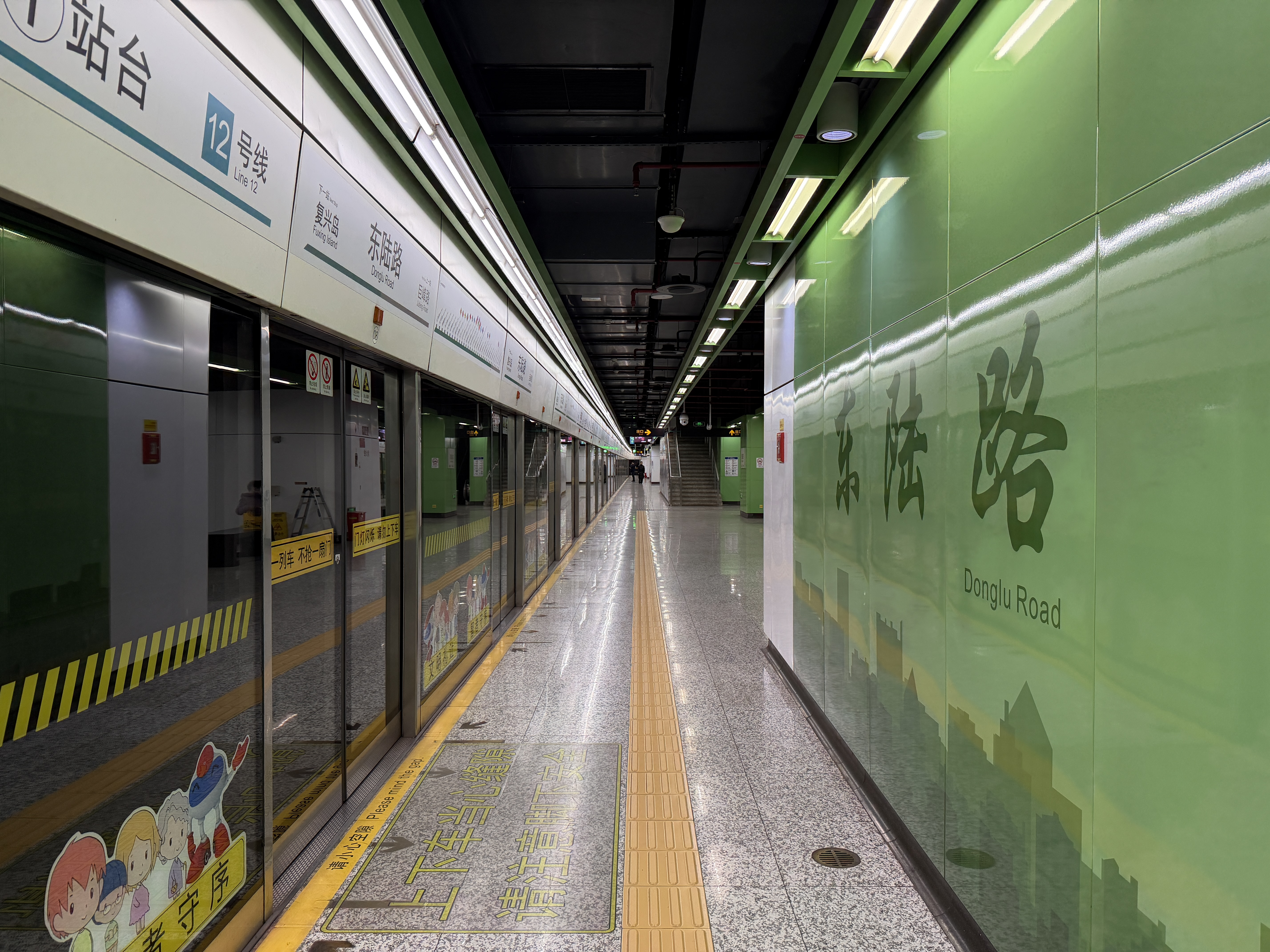
- Station platform

General information
- Location: North Pudong Road and Donglu Road; Pudong, Shanghai; China
- Coordinates: 31.28469°N 121.57505°E
- Line: Line 12
- Platforms: 2 (1 island platform)
- Tracks: 2

Construction
- Structure type: Underground
- Accessible: Yes

History
- Opened: 29 December 2013

Services
| Preceding station | Shanghai Metro | Following station |
|---|---|---|
| Fuxing Island towards Qixin Road | Line 12 | Jufeng Road towards Jinhai Road |
Location

Donglu Road (simplified Chinese: 东陆路; traditional Chinese: 東陸路; pinyin: Dōnglù Lù) is a Shanghai Metro station located on Line 12 in Pudong, Shanghai. Located at the intersection of North Pudong Road and Donglu Road, the station opened on 29 December 2013, as part of an initial fifteen station-long segment of Line 12 between Tiantong Road and Jinhai Road stations.
