= Hongmei Road station =

Shanghai Metro station

Hongmei Road 虹梅路
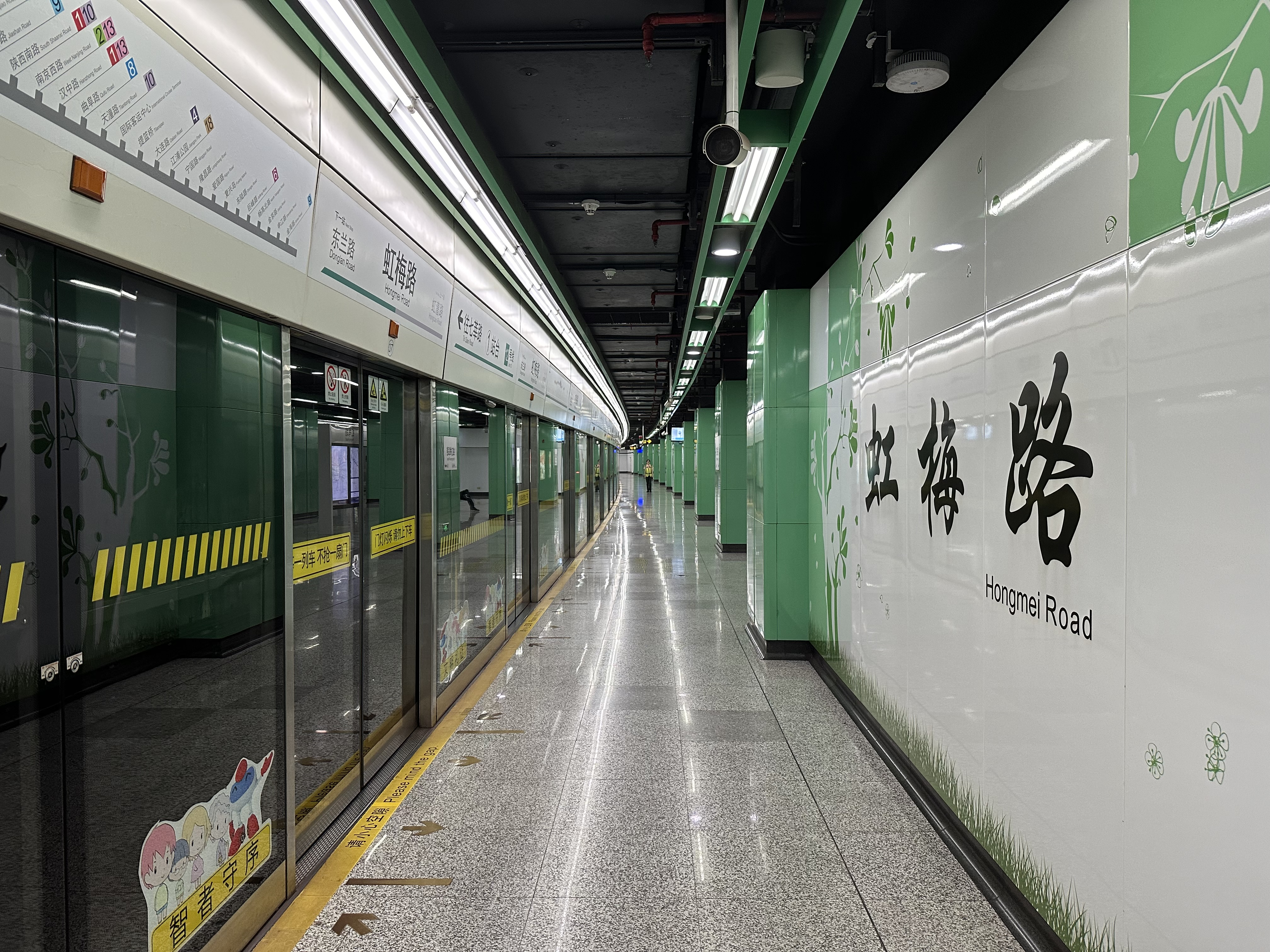
- Platform

General information
- Location: Caobao Road (漕宝路) and Gumei Road (古美路); Xuhui District and Minhang District, Shanghai; China
- Coordinates: 31.16223°N 121.39269°E
- Operated by: Shanghai No. 4 Metro Operation Co. Ltd.
- Line: Line 12
- Platforms: 2 (1 island platform)
- Tracks: 2

Construction
- Structure type: Underground
- Accessible: Yes

History
- Opened: December 19, 2015

Services
Preceding station	Shanghai Metro	Following station
Donglan Road towards Qixin Road	Line 12	Hongcao Road towards Jinhai Road
Location

Hongmei Road (Chinese: 虹梅路; pinyin: Hóngméi Lù) is a station on the Shanghai Metro, which services Line 12 and opened on December 19, 2015.
