= Shenjiang Road station =

Shanghai Metro station

Shenjiang Road 申江路
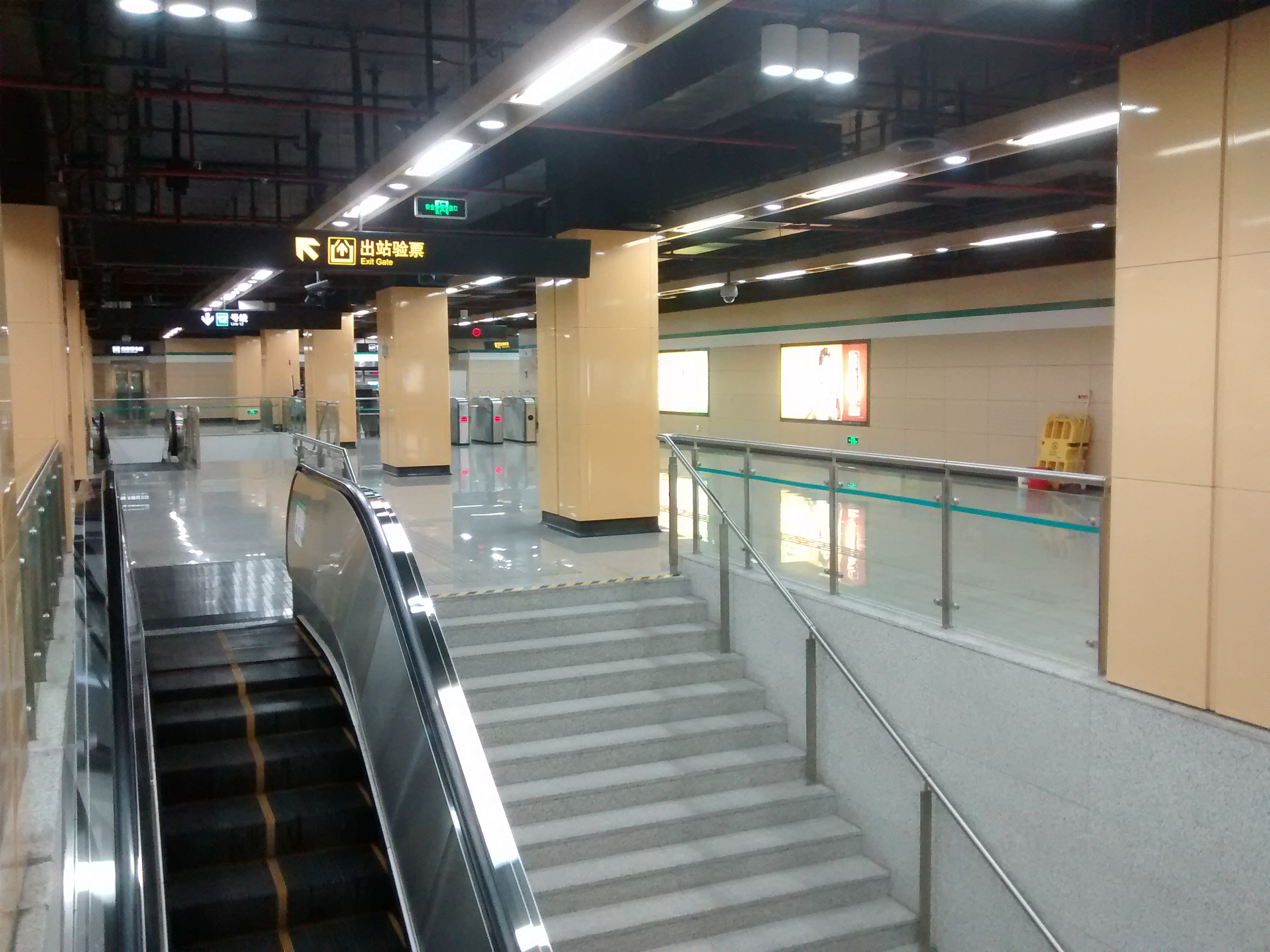
- Station concourse

General information
- Location: Jufeng Road (巨峰路) and Shenjiang Road (申江路); Jinqiao, Pudong, Shanghai; China
- Coordinates: 31.282309°N 121.622535°E
- Line: Line 12
- Platforms: 2 (1 island platform)
- Tracks: 2

Construction
- Structure type: Underground
- Accessible: Yes

History
- Opened: 29 December 2013

Services
Preceding station	Shanghai Metro	Following station
Jinjing Road towards Qixin Road	Line 12	Jinhai Road Terminus
Location

Shenjiang Road (Chinese: 申江路; pinyin: Shēnjiāng Lù) is a station on Line 12 of the Shanghai Metro.

The station will become an interchange with Line 22 (formerly Chongming Line).
