= Shanghai Bus Route 13 =

Bus route in Shanghai, China

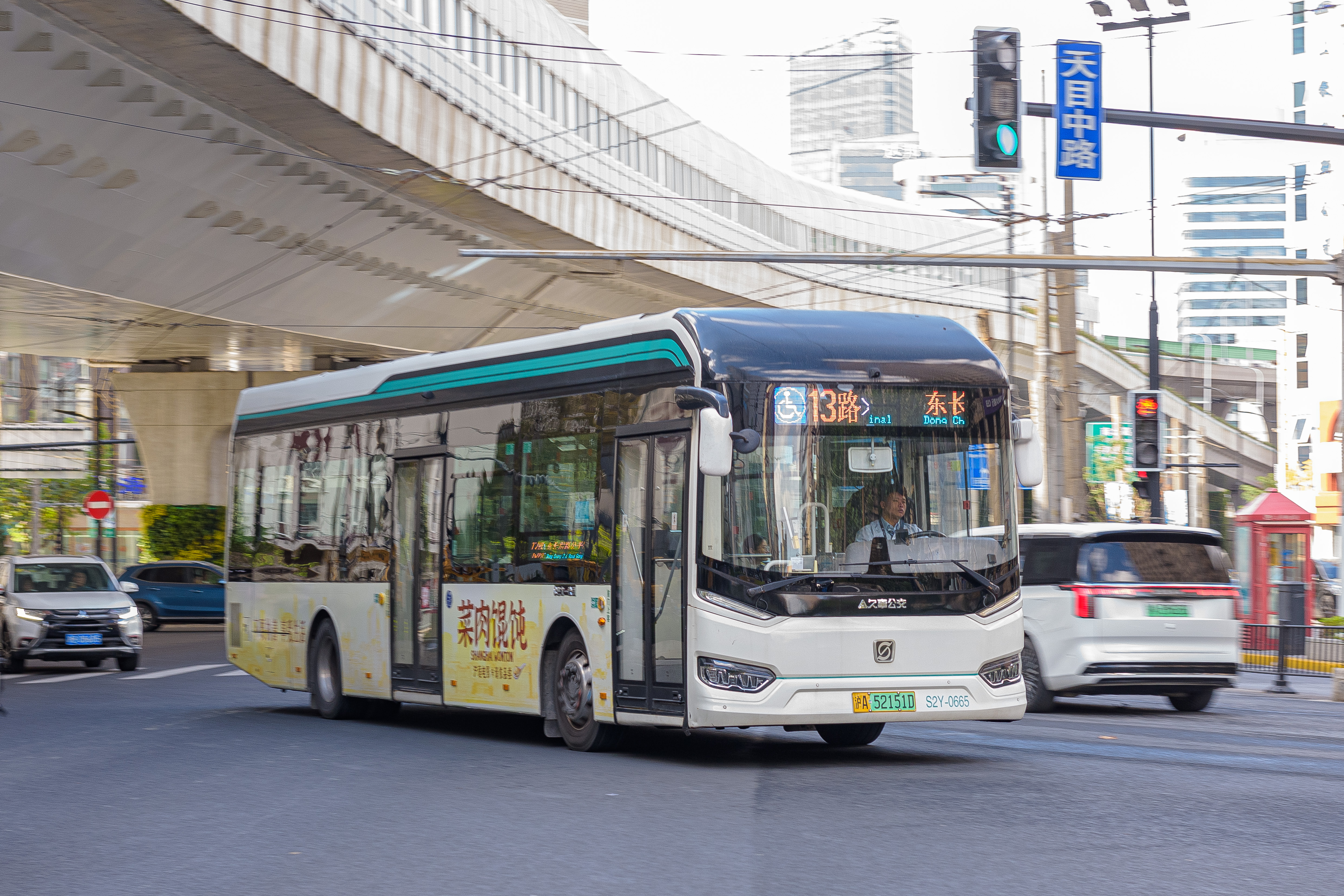
- A Sunwin iEV12 along Middle Tianmu Road in October 2025. Overhead trolleybus wires which route 13 formerly used can be seen above.

Overview
- Operator: Shanghai Ba-Shi No.1 Public Transportation Co. Ltd (巴士一公司)
- Vehicle: Sunwin iEV10 & iEV12
- Began service: 8 October 1960

Route
- Route type: Bus route
- Start: Zhongshan Park metro station
- Via: Changning Road, Changshou Road, Middle Tianmu Road, Haining Road, Zhoujiazui Road
- End: Dongchangzhi Road & Gongping Road Terminal
- Length: 12 kilometres (7.5 mi)
- Stops: 18 (both directions)
- Competition: Bus routes 63, 510 and 941

Bus route 13 is a bus route in Shanghai, China. It started operations on 8 October 1960, and currently runs between Zhongshan Park metro station and Dongchangzhi Road & Gongping Road Terminal. It is operated by Shanghai Ba-Shi No.1 Public Transportation Co. Ltd.

The route formerly operated as a trolleybus route for 62 years between 1960 and 2022, before being converted to run on conventional electric buses on 1 January 2023.

== History ==
The route was renumbered two times, originally numbered as conventional bus route 12 and used diesel buses when it started operations before renumbered as route 72 in 1956, prior to being converted to run as trolleybus route 13.

=== Bus routes 12 and 72 ===
Route 12 originally began operations on 10 August 1947, and runs between Xinzhaqiao (present day Datong Road) and Tilanqiao.

In 1950, route 12 was extended westward to Hengfengqiao (present day No.2 Shimen Road).

In 1951, the route was further extended westward to Xikang Road & Hengfeng Road, before being extended again to Xinkangli on 12 August the following year.

On 1 November 1956, following a reorganization of bus route numbers in Shanghai, route 12 was renumber route 72 and operations were extended overnight.

=== Trolleybus/bus route 13 ===
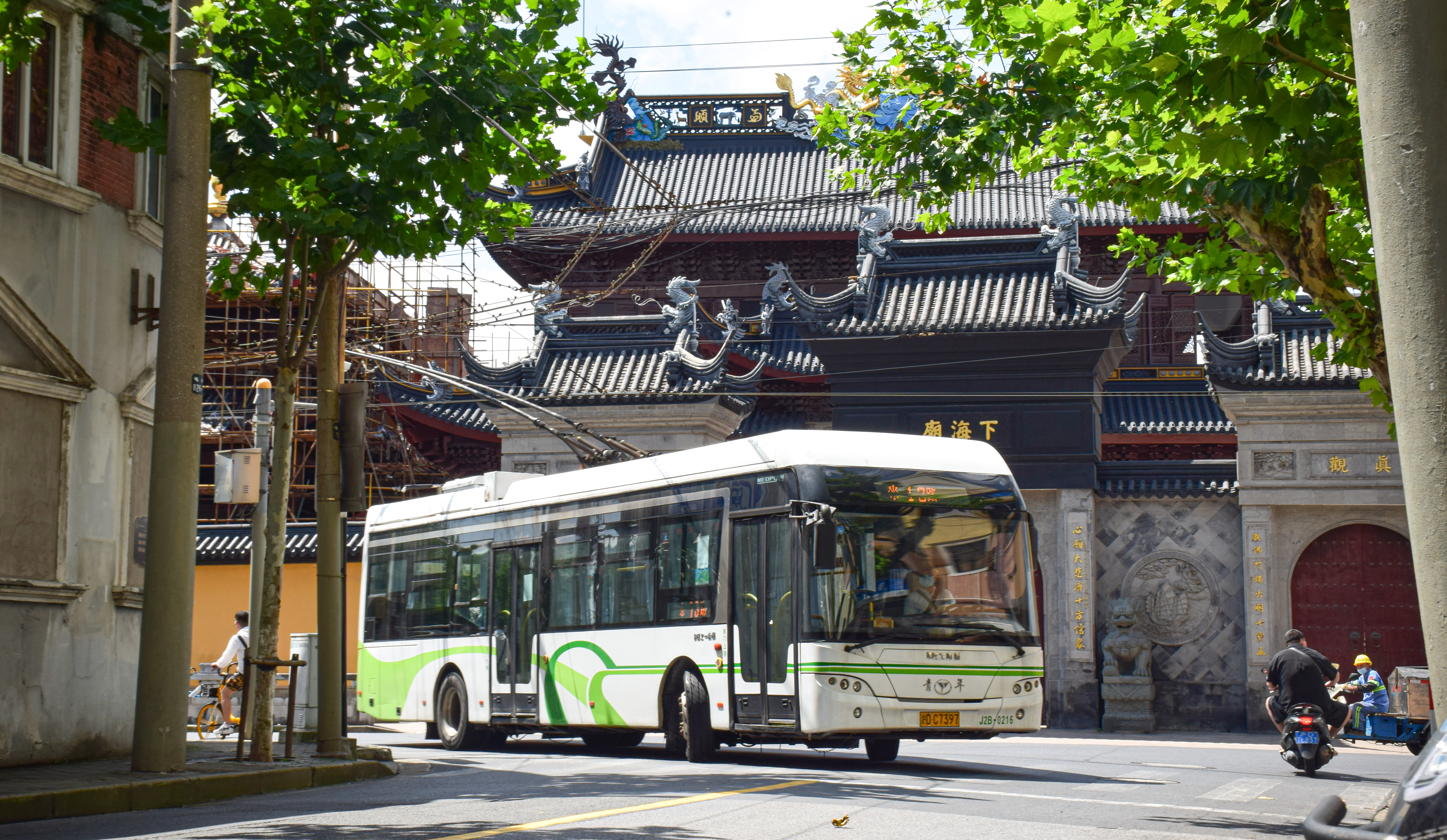
A Youngman Neoplan trolleybus on route 13 in 2021

On 8 October 1960, trolleybus route 13 was introduced between Caojiadu and Tilanqiao to replace bus route 72, with a length of 9.9 kilometres (6.2 mi).

In January 1962, the 13-63 combined night route started operations. It was renumbered route 319 in August 1978.

In 2010, trolleybus route 13 and conventional route 922 merged to become a single line, extended to Zhongshan Park metro station, and was split to two variants: A full route and a partial route. The partial route, which still ran between Caojiadu and Tilanqiao, continues to use trolleybuses. The full route, which runs between Zhongshan Park metro station and Tilanqiao, used conventional diesel buses due to the lack of overhead wires along Changning Road, which was part of the extended sector.

On 24 June 2014, the previous mixed fleet was replaced entirely by newly-purchased Youngman trolleybuses for both the partial and full routes. As Changning Road still lacked overhead wires, buses on the full route will run using their batteries without the need for overhead wires. The partial route was withdrawn in 2016.

On 29 May 2021, the eastern terminus of route 13 was shifted from Tilanqiao to its current location at Dongchangzhi Road & Gongping Road Terminal, located under Raffles City The Bund shopping complex.

In August 2021, the government of Shanghai announced that six existing trolleybus lines, including route 13, would be converted to run on conventional electric buses instead. The replacement of trolleybuses took place on 1 January 2023, with 22 Sunwin electric buses entering service, ending the tenure of route 13 as a trolleybus route.

== Route information ==
The route charges a flat fare of 2RMB (US$0.31).

Route 13 passes by the following landmarks:

- Raffles City The Bund & 12 Tilanqiao
- Shanghai General Hospital
- Shanghai Railway Museum
- Shanghai railway station & 1 3 4 Shanghai Railway Station
- Jade Buddha Temple
- Putuo People's Hospital
- Caojiadu
- People's Government of Changning District
- Zhongshan Park & 2 3 4 Zhongshan Park

== In popular culture ==
Trolleybus route 13 was featured in the 2023 Chinese television series Blossoms Shanghai, in which Xue Zhi (Du Juan), who was the first love of main character A Bao (Hu Ge), was a fare inspector on the route. According to a Weibo post by Shanghai Morning Post, several buses on the real-life route 13 are expected to feature an advertisement highlighting the series.
