= Qufu Road station =

Shanghai Metro interchange station

Qufu Road 曲阜路
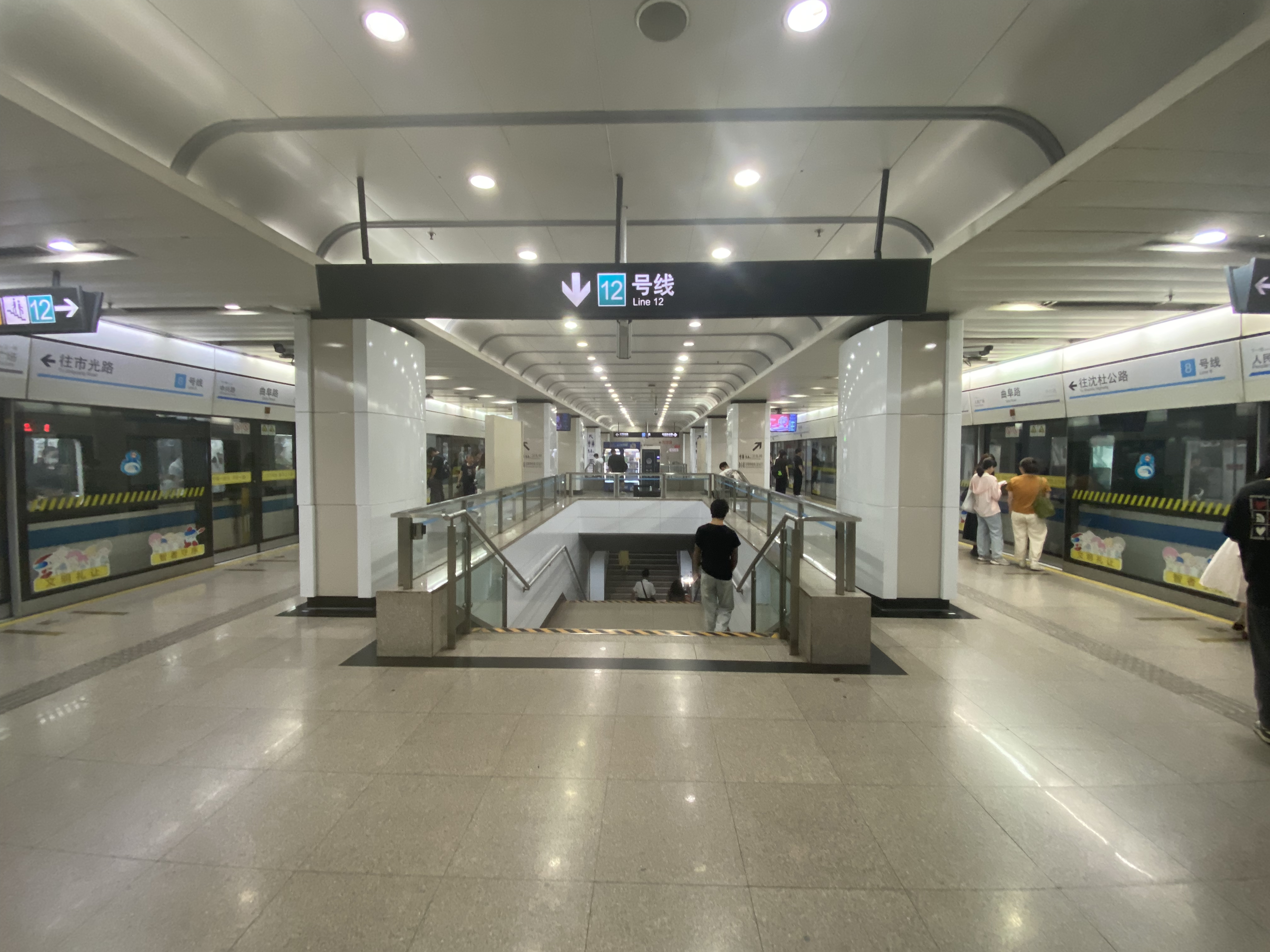
- Line 8 platform

General information
- Location: North Xizang Road and Qufu Road (曲阜路); Jing'an District, Shanghai; China
- Coordinates: 31.2447°N 121.467°E
- Operated by: Shanghai No. 4 Metro Operation Co. Ltd.
- Lines: Line 8; Line 12
- Platforms: 4 (2 island platforms)
- Tracks: 4

Construction
- Structure type: Underground
- Accessible: Yes

History
- Opened: Line 8 (29 December 2007); Line 12 (10 May 2014)

Services
Preceding station	Shanghai Metro	Following station
Zhongxing Road towards Shiguang Road	Line 8	People's Square towards Shendu Highway
Hanzhong Road towards Qixin Road	Line 12	Tiantong Road towards Jinhai Road
Location

Qufu Road (Chinese: 曲阜路; pinyin: Qǔfù Lù) is an interchange station on Line 8 and Line 12 of the Shanghai Metro. The station began operation on 29 December 2007, and it is located in Shanghai's Jing'an District. The Line 12 station was opened on 10 May 2014, and served as the western terminus of the line until the opening of the extension to Qixin Road on 19 December 2015.

== Station Layout ==
G	Entrances and Exits	Exits 1-5
B1	Concourse	Faregates, Station Agent
B2	Northbound	← Line 8 towards Shiguang Road (Zhongqing Road)
B2	Island platform, doors open on the left
B2	Southbound	Line 8 towards Shendu Highway (People's Square) →
B3	Westbound	← Line 12 towards Qixin Road (Hanzhong Road)
B3	Island platform, doors open on the left
B3	Eastbound	Line 12 towards Jinhai Road (Tiantong Road) →

== Gallery ==
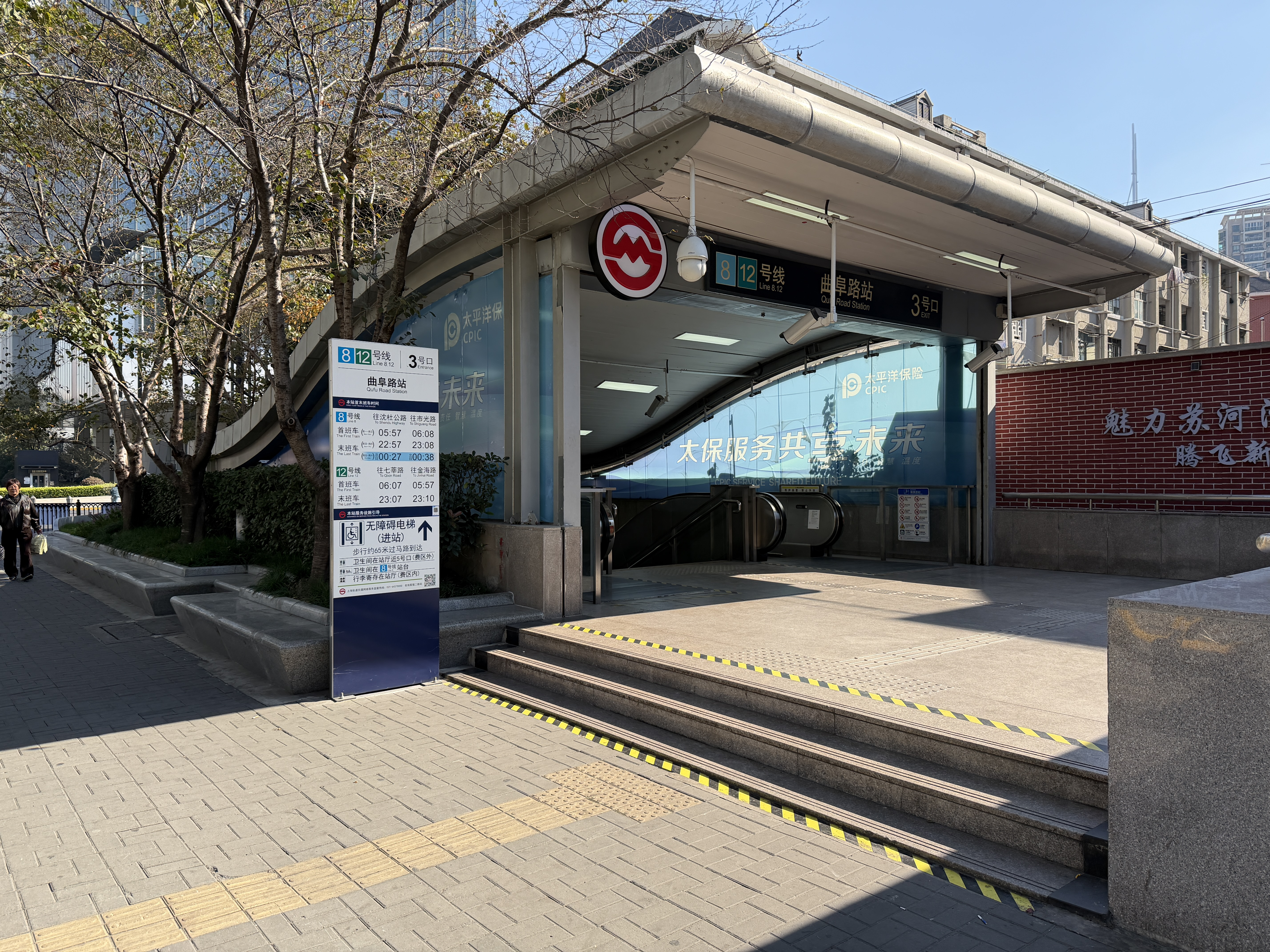
Exit 3

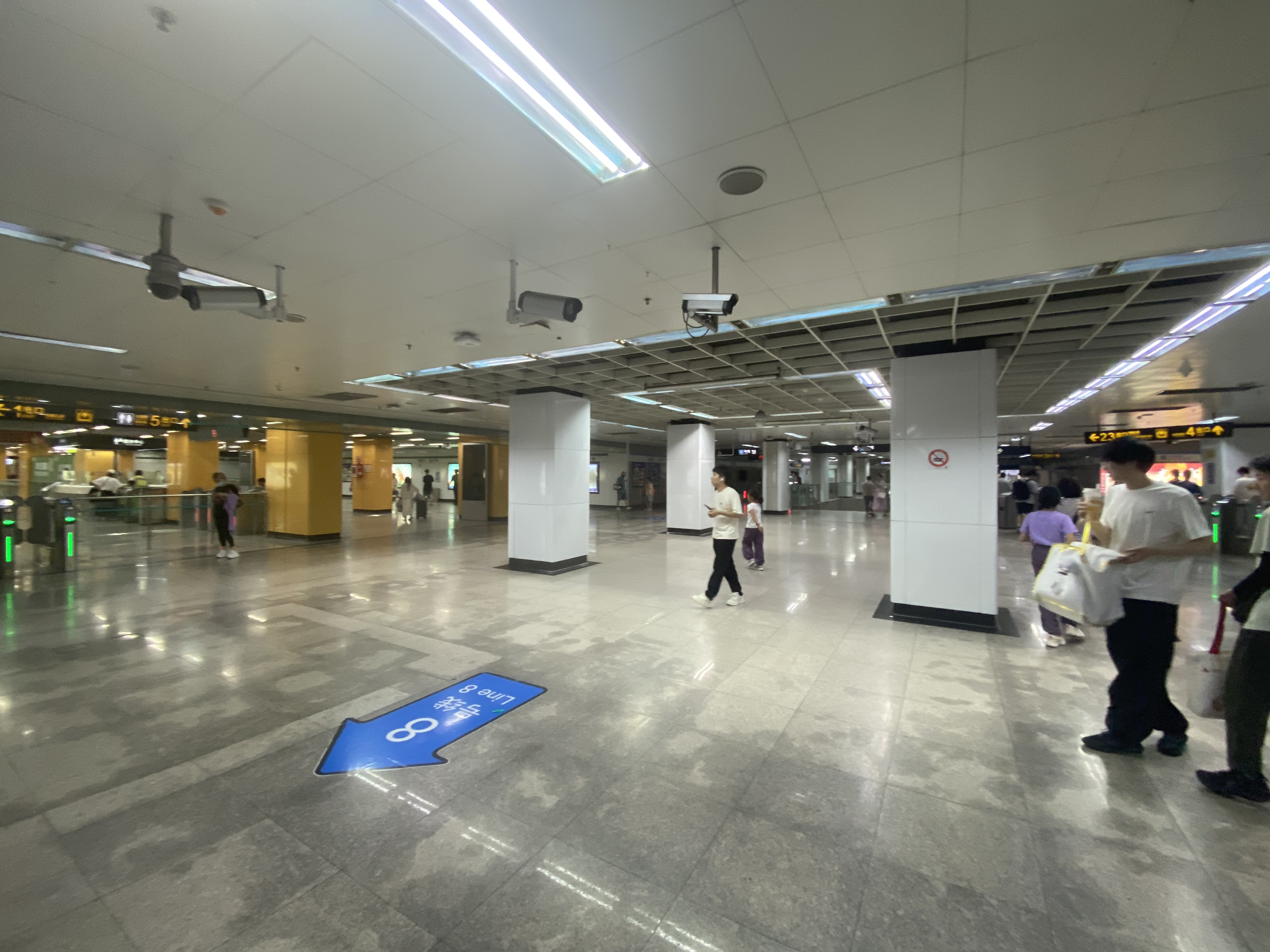
Concourse

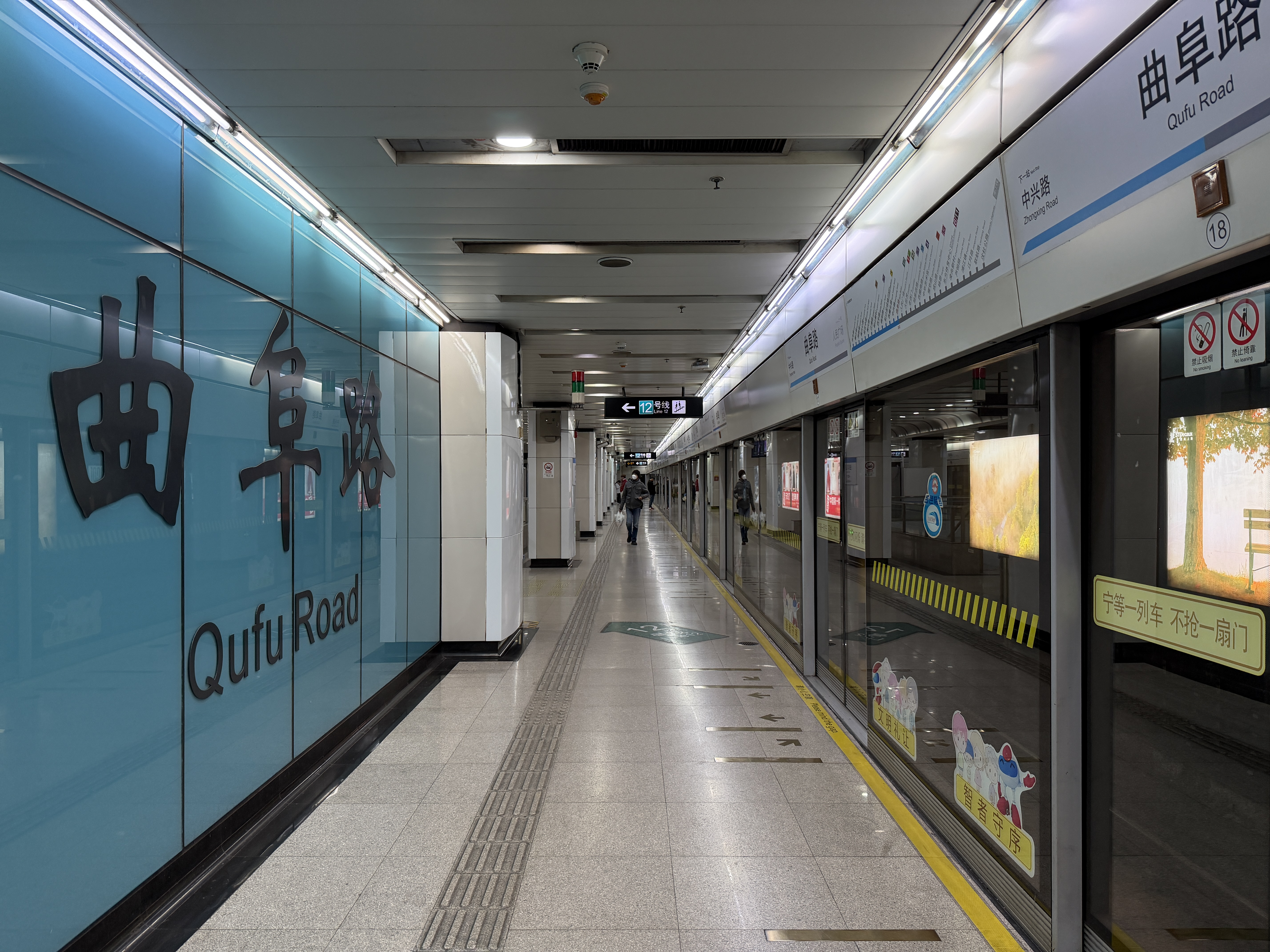
Line 8 platform

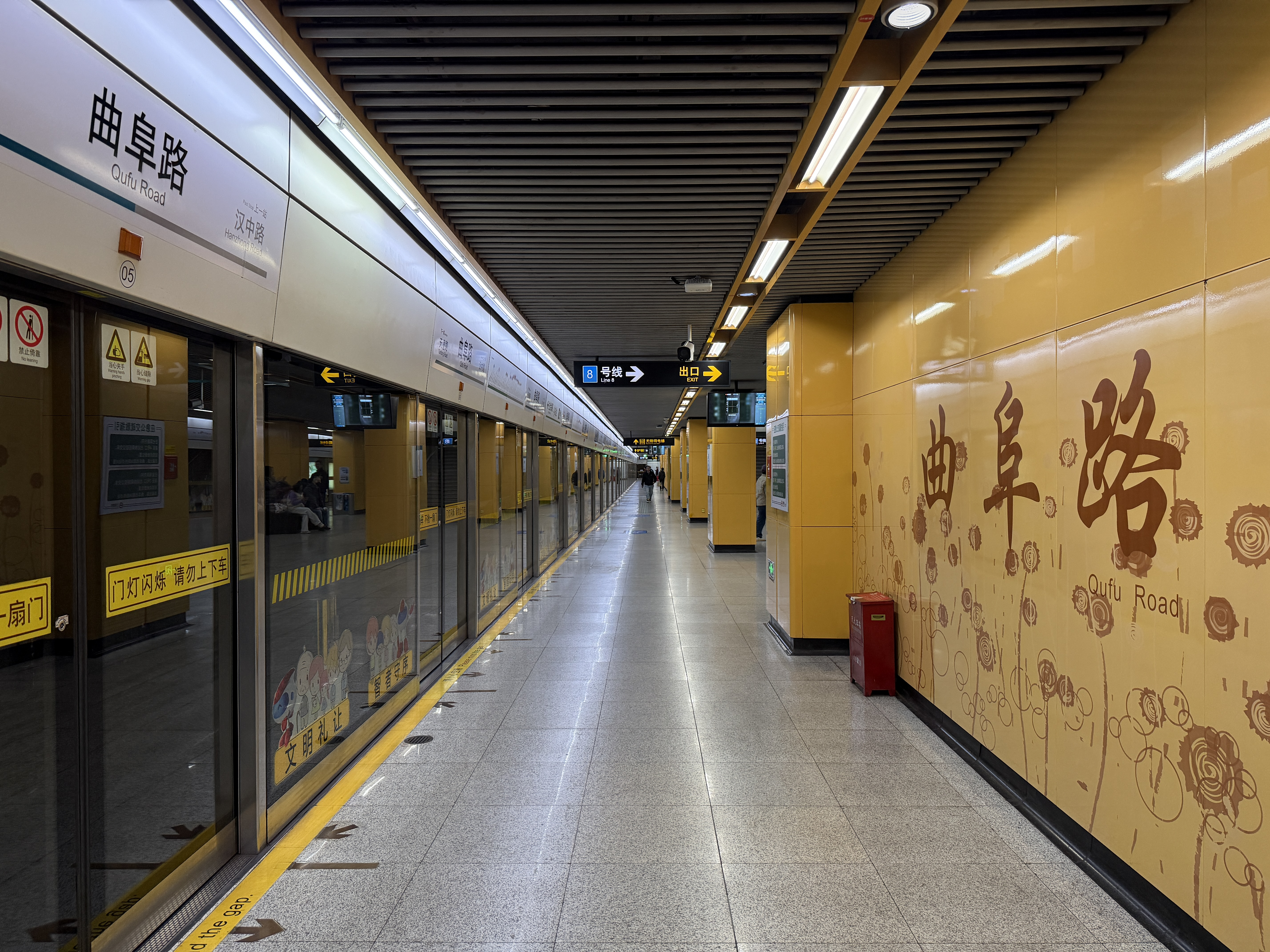
Line 12 platform
