= Hongxin Road station =

Shanghai Metro station

Hongxin Road 虹莘路
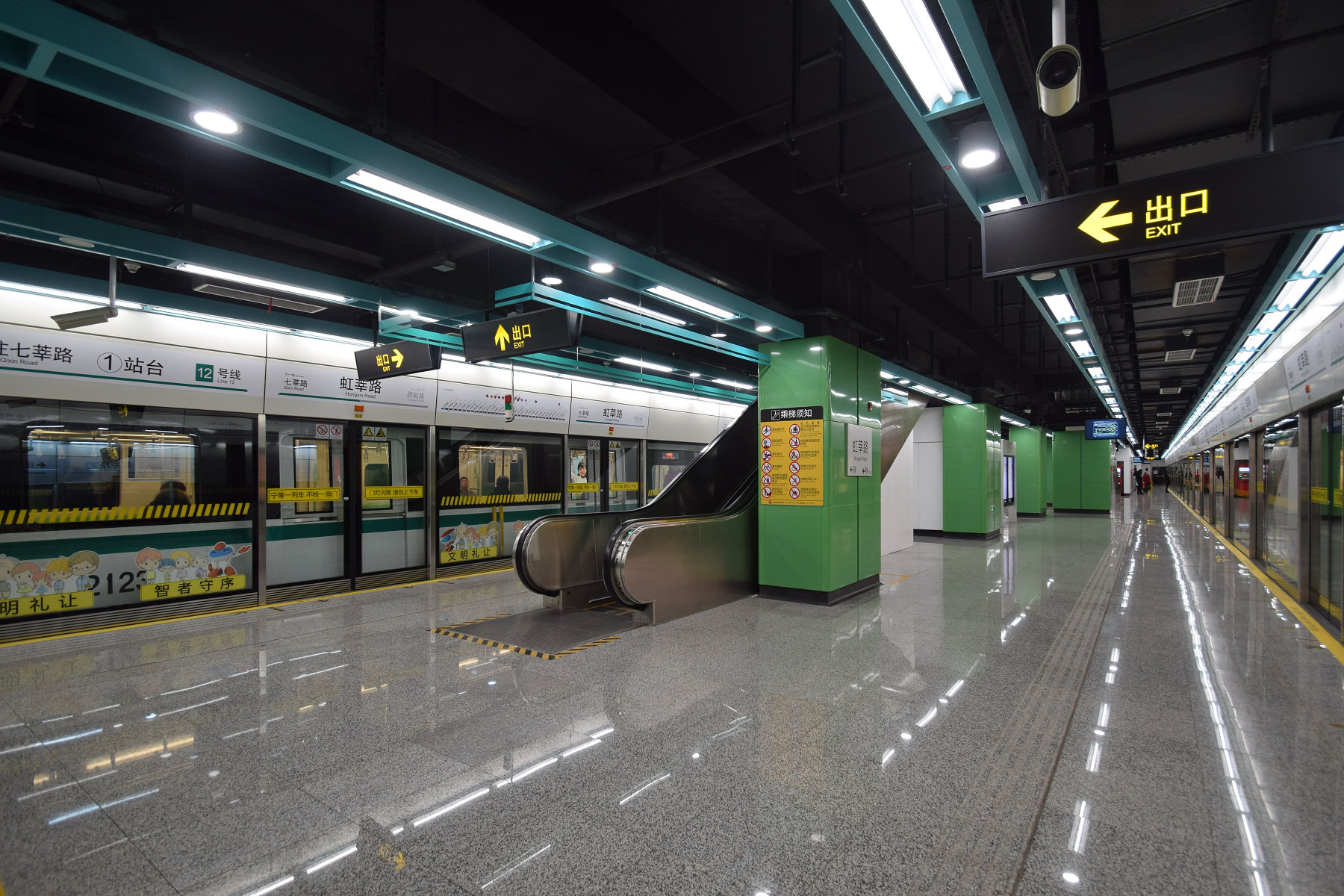
- Station platform

General information
- Location: Gudai Road (顾戴路) and Hongxin Road (虹莘路); Minhang District, Shanghai; China
- Coordinates: 31°08′23″N 121°22′34″E
- Operated by: Shanghai No. 4 Metro Operation Co. Ltd.
- Line: Line 12
- Platforms: 2 (1 island platform)
- Tracks: 2

Construction
- Structure type: Underground
- Accessible: Yes

History
- Opened: December 19, 2015

Services
Preceding station	Shanghai Metro	Following station
Qixin Road Terminus	Line 12	Gudai Road towards Jinhai Road
Location

Hongxin Road (Chinese: 虹莘路; pinyin: Hóngxīn Lù) is a station on the Shanghai Metro, which services Line 12 and opened on December 19, 2015.

The process of constructing the station caused congestion on Hongxin Road.

The commercial and office complex Hongxianghui (红象汇) was built above the station in 2023. Its underground level was planned to be directly connected to the station. Because the station was in active use while the complex was being constructed, the developers collaborated with the metro agency on emergency preparedness.
