= Line 12 (Shanghai Metro) =

Metro line of the Shanghai Metro

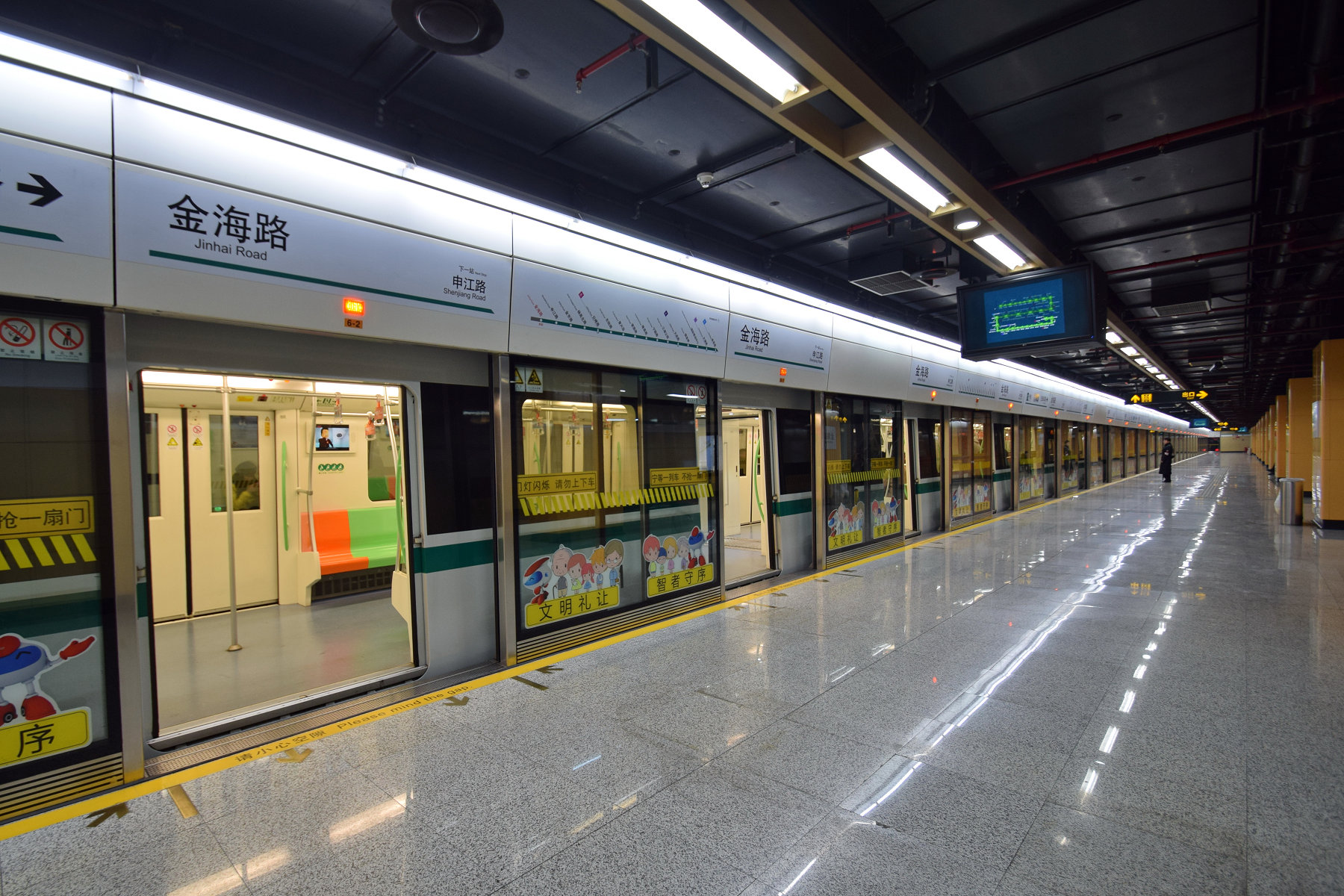
- Jinhai Road station line 12 platform

Overview
- Other name(s): M2 (planned name); Minpu line
- Native name: 上海地铁12号线
- Status: Operational
- Owner: Shanghai Rail Transit Line 12 Development Co., Ltd.
- Locale: Pudong; Yangpu, Hongkou, Jing'an, Huangpu, Xuhui, and Minhang districts, Shanghai, China
- Termini: Qixin Road; Jinhai Road
- Stations: 32

Service
- Type: Rapid transit
- System: Shanghai Metro
- Services: Mainline: Qixin Road ↔ Jinhai Road; Partial Mainline: Hongmei Road ↔ Jufeng Road
- Operator: Shanghai No. 4 Metro Operation Co. Ltd.
- Depot(s): Zhongchun Road Yard; Jinqiao Yard
- Rolling stock: 12A01; 12A02; 12A03
- Daily ridership: 826,000 (2019 Peak)

History
- Work began: 30 December 2008; 17 years ago
- Opened: 29 December 2013; 12 years ago
- Last extension: 19 December 2015; 10 years ago

Technical
- Line length: 40.4 km (25.10 mi)
- Number of tracks: 2
- Character: Underground
- Track gauge: 1,435 mm (4 ft 8 1/2 in)
- Electrification: Overhead lines (1500 volts)
- Operating speed: 80 km/h (50 mph); Average speed: 28.5 km/h (18 mph)
- Signalling: ALSTOM Urbalis CBTC
Route map
To scale geographic map:

Line 12 is an east–west line of the Shanghai Metro network. It runs from Jinhai Road in Pudong to Qixin Road in Minhang District. The first section from Tiantong Road to Jinhai Road opened on 29 December 2013, and additional stations up to Qufu Road were in operation by 10 May 2014. The remaining stations opened on 19 December 2015. Since the opening of the extension in December 2015, Line 12 has the most interchanges with other metro lines in the Shanghai Metro. The line is colored forest green on system maps.

== History ==
Shanghai metro line 12 opening history
Segment	Commencement	Opened	Length	Station(s)	Name	Investment
Tiantong Road — Jinhai Road	30 Dec 2008	29 Dec 2013	17.5 km (10.87 mi)	15	Initial phase (1st section)	¥23.399 billion
Qufu Road — Tiantong Road	30 Dec 2008	10 May 2014	1.1 km (0.68 mi)	1	Initial phase (1st section)	¥23.399 billion
Qixin Road — Qufu Road	30 Dec 2008	19 Dec 2015	21.8 km (13.55 mi)	16	Initial phase (2nd section)	¥23.399 billion
Dongjing — Qixin Road	16 Dec 2022	exp 2028	17.2 km (10.69 mi)	6	Western extension

=== Construction accident ===
On 31 December 2012, the ground maintenance warehouse of Jinqiao Parking Lot collapsed during the construction process, resulting in 5 deaths and 18 injuries.

== Stations ==
=== Service routes ===
Shanghai metro line 12 service routes
M - Mainline: Qixin Road ↔ Jinhai Road; P - Partial Mainline: Hongmei Road ↔ Jufeng Road
Routes		Station name		Connections	Distance			Location	Open- ing	Plat- form
M	P	English	Chinese	Connections	km		min	Location	Open- ing	Plat- form
		Dongjing	洞泾	9	0.00	0.00		Songjiang	West extension under construction exp 2028
		Liuwu Highway	刘五公路		1.91	1.91		Songjiang	West extension under construction exp 2028
		Husong Highway	沪松公路		1.96	3.87		Songjiang	West extension under construction exp 2028
		Hi-tech Park	科技园		5.36	9.23		Songjiang	West extension under construction exp 2028
		Changxi Road	场西路		1.44	10.67		Songjiang	West extension under construction exp 2028
		Changdong Road	场东路		1.78	12.45		Songjiang	West extension under construction exp 2028
●		Qixin Road	七莘路		4.73	17.18	0	Minhang	19 Dec 2015	Underground Island
●		Hongxin Road	虹莘路		1.73	18.91	4	Minhang	19 Dec 2015	Underground Island
●		Gudai Road	顾戴路		1.23	20.14	6	Minhang	19 Dec 2015	Underground Island
●		Donglan Road	东兰路		1.87	22.01	9	Minhang	19 Dec 2015	Underground Island
●	●	Hongmei Road	虹梅路		0.69	22.70	11	Minhang	19 Dec 2015	Underground Island
●	●	Hongcao Road	虹漕路		1.42	24.12	14	Xuhui	19 Dec 2015	Underground Island
●	●	Guilin Park	桂林公园	15	0.83	24.95	16	Xuhui	19 Dec 2015	Underground Island
●	●	Caobao Road	漕宝路	1	1.55	26.50	19	Xuhui	19 Dec 2015	Underground Island
●	●	Longcao Road	龙漕路	3	0.84	27.34	21	Xuhui	19 Dec 2015	Underground Island
●	●	Longhua	龙华	11	1.04	28.38	24	Xuhui	19 Dec 2015	Underground Island
●	●	Middle Longhua Road	龙华中路	7	1.35	29.73	26	Xuhui	19 Dec 2015	Underground Side
●	●	Damuqiao Road	大木桥路	4	1.57	31.30	29	Xuhui	19 Dec 2015	Underground Island
●	●	Jiashan Road	嘉善路	9	1.01	32.31	31	Xuhui	19 Dec 2015	Underground Island
●	●	South Shaanxi Road	陕西南路	1 10	1.49	33.80	34	Huangpu	19 Dec 2015	Underground Island
●	●	West Nanjing Road	南京西路	2 13 (Note: Virtual transfer with line 2 or line 13 – passengers who hold the Shanghai Public Transportation Card and transfer within 30 minutes of exiting the station are able to transfer to other lines without exiting the system.)	1.40	35.20	37	Jing'an	19 Dec 2015	Underground Island
●	●	Hanzhong Road	汉中路	1 13	1.48	36.68	40	Jing'an	19 Dec 2015	Underground Island
●	●	Qufu Road	曲阜路	8	1.24	37.92	43	Jing'an	10 May 2014	Underground Island
●	●	Tiantong Road	天潼路	10	1.04	38.96	45	Jing'an	29 Dec 2013	Underground Side
●	●	International Cruise Terminal	国际客运中心		1.69	40.65	49	Hongkou	29 Dec 2013	Underground Side
●	●	Tilanqiao	提篮桥		0.98	41.63	51	Hongkou	29 Dec 2013	Underground Island
●	●	Dalian Road	大连路	4	0.79	42.42	53	Yangpu	29 Dec 2013	Underground Island
●	●	Jiangpu Park	江浦公园	18	1.29	43.71	55	Yangpu	29 Dec 2013	Underground Island
●	●	Ningguo Road	宁国路		0.91	44.62	58	Yangpu	29 Dec 2013	Underground Island
●	●	Longchang Road	隆昌路		1.42	46.04	61	Yangpu	29 Dec 2013	Underground Side
●	●	Aiguo Road	爱国路		0.92	46.96	63	Yangpu	29 Dec 2013	Underground Island
●	●	Fuxing Island	复兴岛		0.82	47.78	65	Yangpu	29 Dec 2013	Underground Island
●	●	Donglu Road	东陆路		1.70	49.48	68	Pudong	29 Dec 2013	Underground Island
●	●	Jufeng Road	巨峰路	6	1.09	50.57	71	Pudong	29 Dec 2013	Underground Island
●		North Yanggao Road	杨高北路		1.27	51.84	74	Pudong	29 Dec 2013	Underground Island
●		Jinjing Road	金京路		1.16	53.00	76	Pudong	29 Dec 2013	Underground Island
●		Shenjiang Road	申江路		1.14	54.14	78	Pudong	29 Dec 2013	Underground Island
●		Jinhai Road	金海路	9	2.53	56.67	83	Pudong	29 Dec 2013	Underground Side

=== Important Stations ===
- Hanzhong Road – a major interchange station with lines 1 and 13.
- South Shaanxi Road – a major interchange station with lines 1 and 10.
- West Nanjing Road – located under the busy Nanjing Road, and an interchange station with lines 2 and 13.

=== Future expansion ===
==== West extension ====
In June 2021 Songjiang's Party secretary announced that a five station 17.3 km (10.7 mi) west extension to Dongjing on line 9 will start construction within the year. Construction began on 16 December 2022 with six stations planned on the extension, all in Shanghai's Songjiang District.

=== Station name change ===
- On 6 June 2012, Chuanchang Road was renamed Middle Longhua Road (before line 12 began serving the station).

== Headways ==
Shanghai metro line 12 headway
Time		Qixin Road - Hongmei Road	Hongmei Road - Jufeng Road	Jufeng Road - Jinhai Road
Monday - Friday (Working Days)
AM peak	7:30–9:30	About 5 min	About 2 min and 30 sec	About 5 min
Off-peak	9:30–16:30	About 6 min
PM peak	16:30–20:00	About 7 min and 30 sec	About 3 min and 45 sec	About 7 min and 30 sec
Other hours	Before 7:30 After 20:00	About 6 - 8 min
Saturday and Sunday (Weekends)
Peak	8:00–19:00	6 min
Other hours	Before 8:00 After 19:00	8 - 10 min

== Technology ==
=== Rolling stock ===
The trains of Line 12 are composed of 6-carriage of Class A cars, with a design speed of 80 km/h (50 mph), VVVF AC drive, and a design life of 30 years.

Shanghai metro Line 12 Rolling stock
Fleet numbers	Manufacturer	Time of manufac- turing	Class	No of car	Assembly (Note: Tc: Trailer with cab; Mp: EMU with pantograph; M: EMU without pantograph.)	Rolling stock	Number	Notes
246	Bombardier Movia 456	2011-2013	A (Note: Class A carriage: 21-24m in length, 3.0m in width and 3.8m in height; Capacity: about 310 people.)	6	Tc+Mp+M+M+Mp+Tc	12A01	1201-1241 (120011-122461)	Original name: AC09B. Same as 07A01 and 09A02 (but different painting).
90	Bombardier Movia 456	2017-2018	A	6	Tc+Mp+M+M+Mp+Tc	12A02	1242-1256 (122471-123361)
114	CRRC Changchun Railway Vehicles Co., Ltd.	2018-2020	A	6	Tc+Mp+M+M+Mp+Tc	12A03	12057-12075 (123371-124501)	USB charging ports (concealed design).

=== Future rolling stock ===
Shanghai Metro Line 12 future rolling stock
Fleet numbers	Manufacturer	Time of manufac- turing	Class	No of car	Assembly (Note: Tc: Trailer with cab; Mp: EMU with pantograph; M: EMU without pantograph.)	Rolling stock	Number	Notes
108	TBA	2026-2027	A (Note: Class A carriage: 21-24m in length, 3.0m in width and 3.8m in height; Capacity: about 310 people.)	6	Tc+Mp+M+M+Mp+Tc	12A04	12076-12093 (124511-125581)

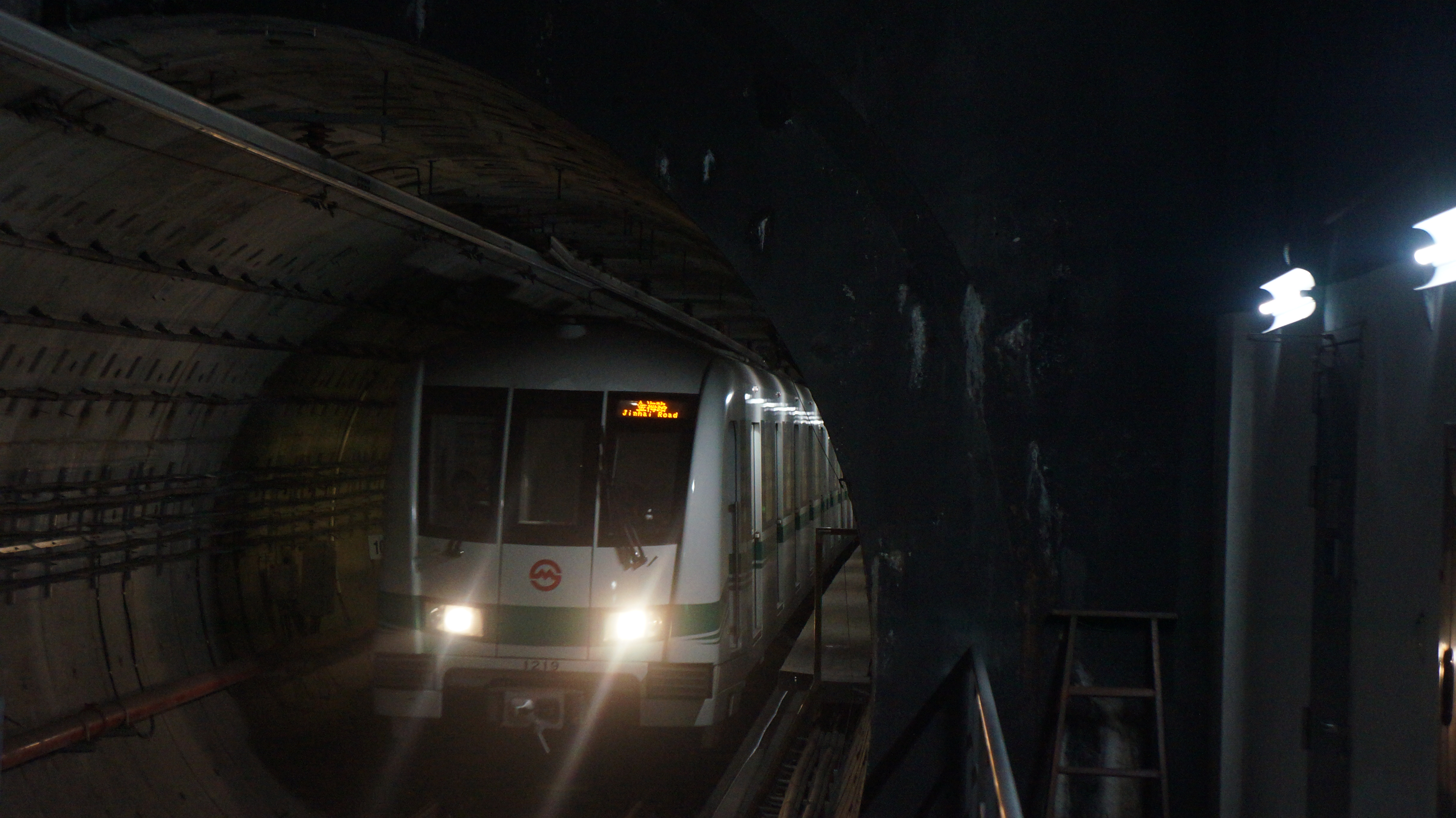
12A01 train

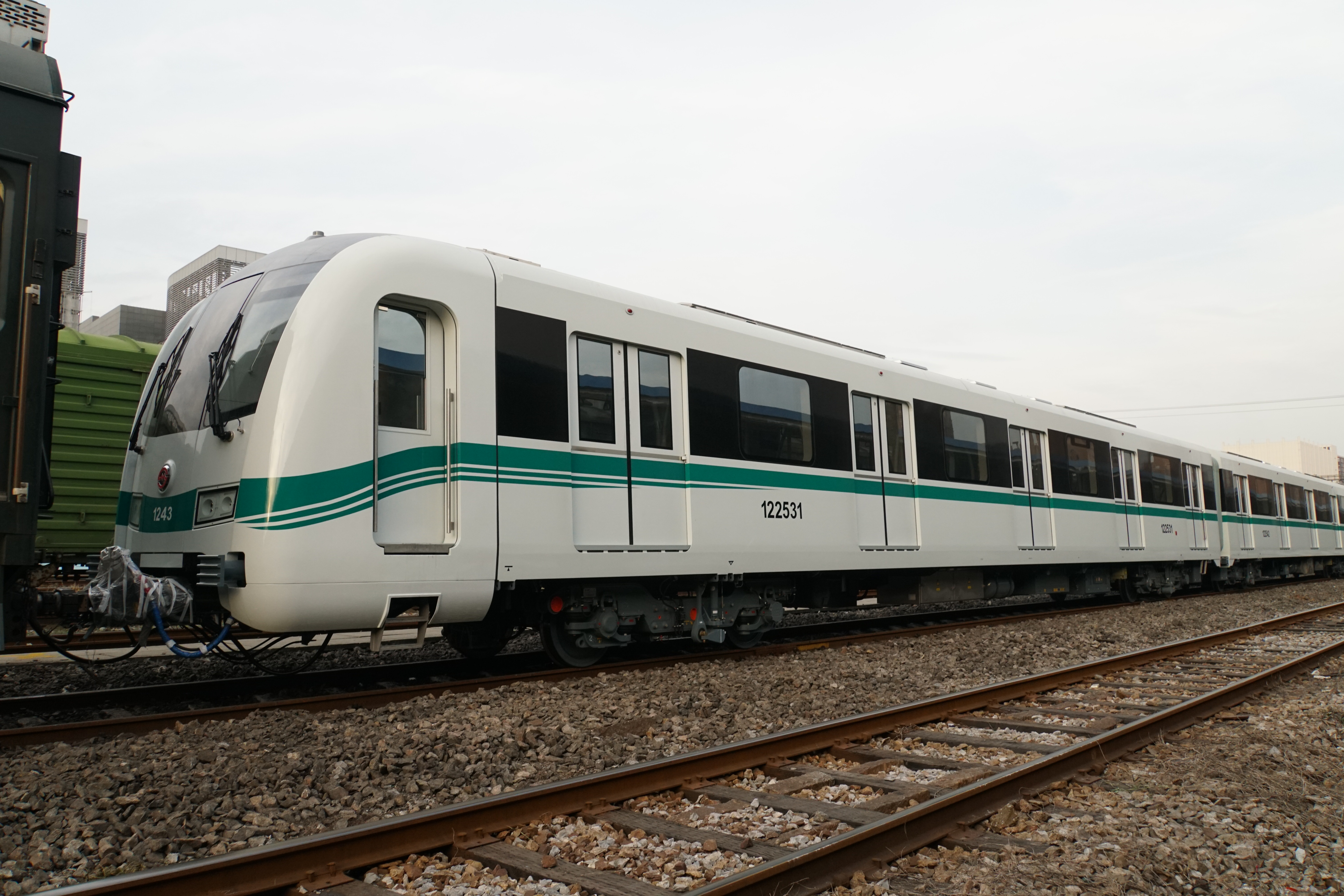
12A02 train being hauled
