= Jinhai Road station (Shanghai Metro) =

Shanghai Metro interchange station

Jinhai Road 金海路
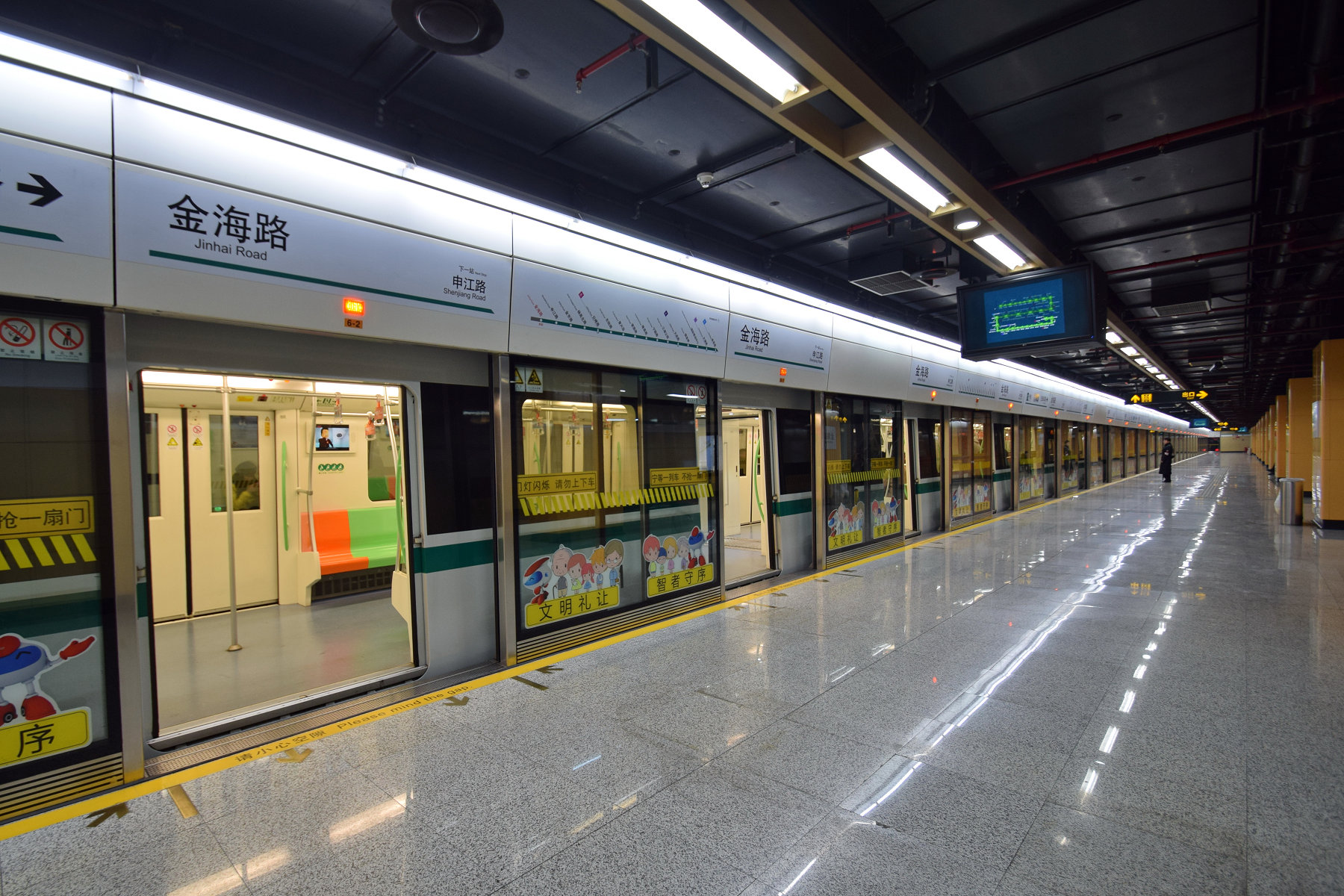
- Line 12 platform

General information
- Location: Jinhai Road (金海路) and Jinsui Road (金穗路); Pudong, Shanghai; China
- Coordinates: 31.265414°N 121.63438°E
- Operator: Shanghai No. 1/4 Metro Operation Co. Ltd.
- Lines: Line 9; Line 12
- Platforms: 4 (1 island platform for Line 9 and 2 side platforms for Line 12)
- Tracks: 4

Construction
- Structure type: Underground
- Accessible: Yes

History
- Opened: 29 December 2013 (Line 12); 30 December 2017 (Line 9)

Services
Preceding station	Shanghai Metro	Following station
Jinji Road towards Shanghai Songjiang Railway Station	Line 9	Gutang Road towards Caolu
Shenjiang Road towards Qixin Road	Line 12	Terminus
Location
- Location within Shanghai

Jinhai Road (Chinese: 金海路; pinyin: Jinhai Lù) is a Shanghai Metro station in the Pudong New Area of Shanghai. Located at the intersection of Jinhai Road and Jinsui Road, it serves as an interchange station between Lines 9 and 12 and the current eastern terminus of Line 12.

The station first opened as the eastern terminus of the first phase of Line 12 on 29 December 2013. It became an interchange station on 30 December 2017 when passenger trial operations began on phase 3 of Line 9, part of an eastern extension to Caolu.

== Station layout ==
1F	Ground level	Exits
B1	Line 12 concourse	Tickets
B2	Line 9 east concourse	Tickets, Service Center
B2	Side platform, doors open on the right
B2	Platform 1	← Line 12 towards Qixin Road (Shenjiang Road)
B2	Platform 2	Line 12 termination track
B2	Side platform, doors open on the right
B2	Line 9 west concourse	Tickets, Service Center
B3	Platform 3	← Line 9 towards Shanghai Songjiang Railway Station (Jinji Road)
B3	Island platform, doors open on the left
B3	Platform 4	Line 9 towards Caolu (Gutang Road) →

=== Entrances/exits ===
- 3: Jinhai Road
- 4: Jinhai Road, Chenshao Road
- 5
- 6
- 7: Jinhai Road, Jinsui Road
