= Qixin Road station =

Shanghai Metro station

Qixin Road 七莘路
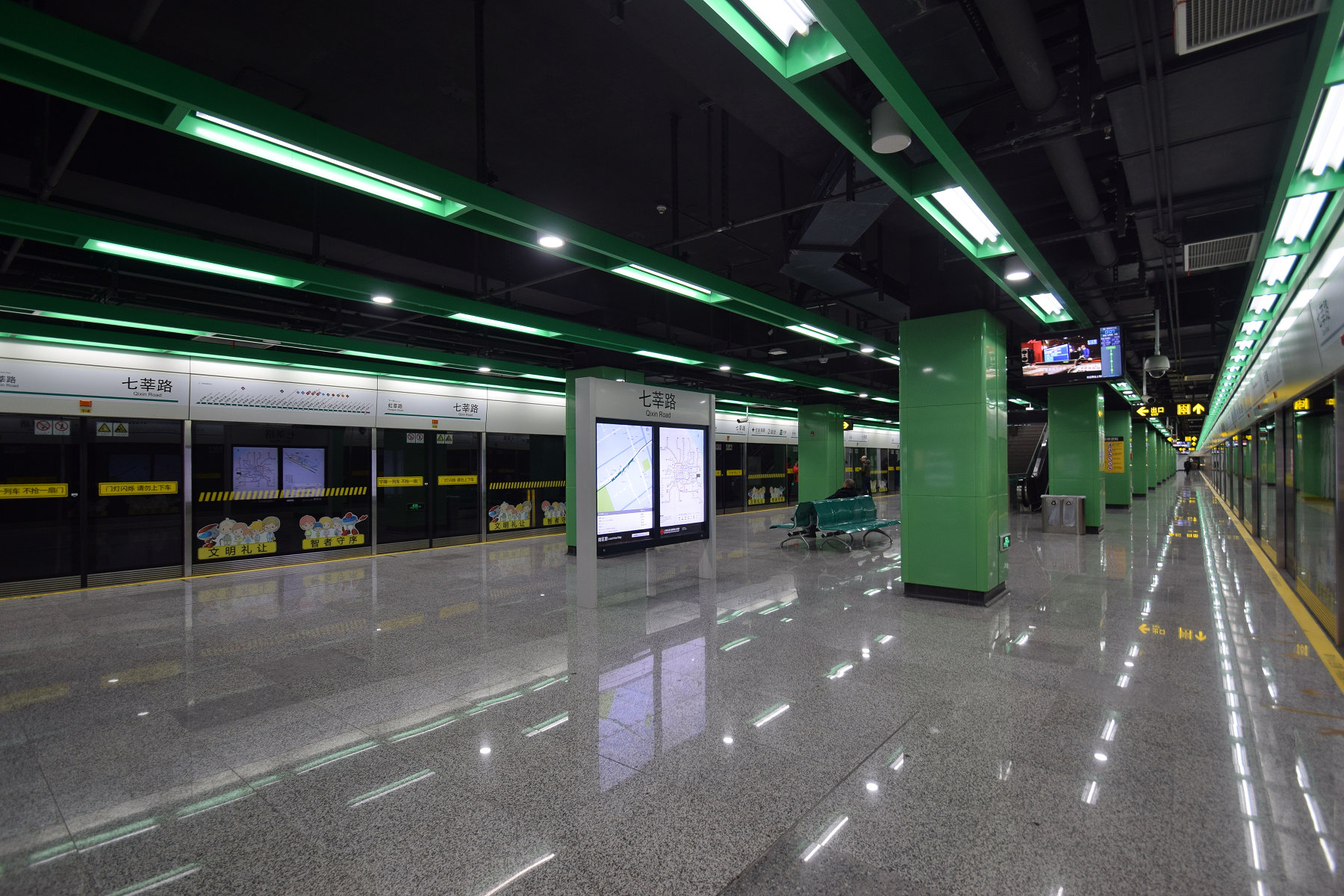
- Station platform

General information
- Location: Gudai Road (顾戴路) and Qixin Road; Xinzhuang, Minhang District, Shanghai; China
- Coordinates: 31°07′59″N 121°21′27″E
- Operated by: Shanghai No. 4 Metro Operation Co. Ltd.
- Line: Line 12
- Platforms: 2 (1 island platform)
- Tracks: 2

Construction
- Structure type: Underground
- Accessible: Yes

Other information
- Station code: L12/01

History
- Opened: December 19, 2015

Services
Preceding station	Shanghai Metro	Following station
Terminus	Line 12	Hongxin Road towards Jinhai Road
Location

Qixin Road (Chinese: 七莘路; pinyin: Qīxīn Lù) is a station on the Shanghai Metro, which services Line 12 and opened on December 19, 2015. It is the western terminus of Line 12.

== Nearby places ==
Shanghai's former Vivo City is connected to the station via the B2 floor.
