= Ningguo Road station =

Shanghai Metro station

Ningguo Road 宁国路
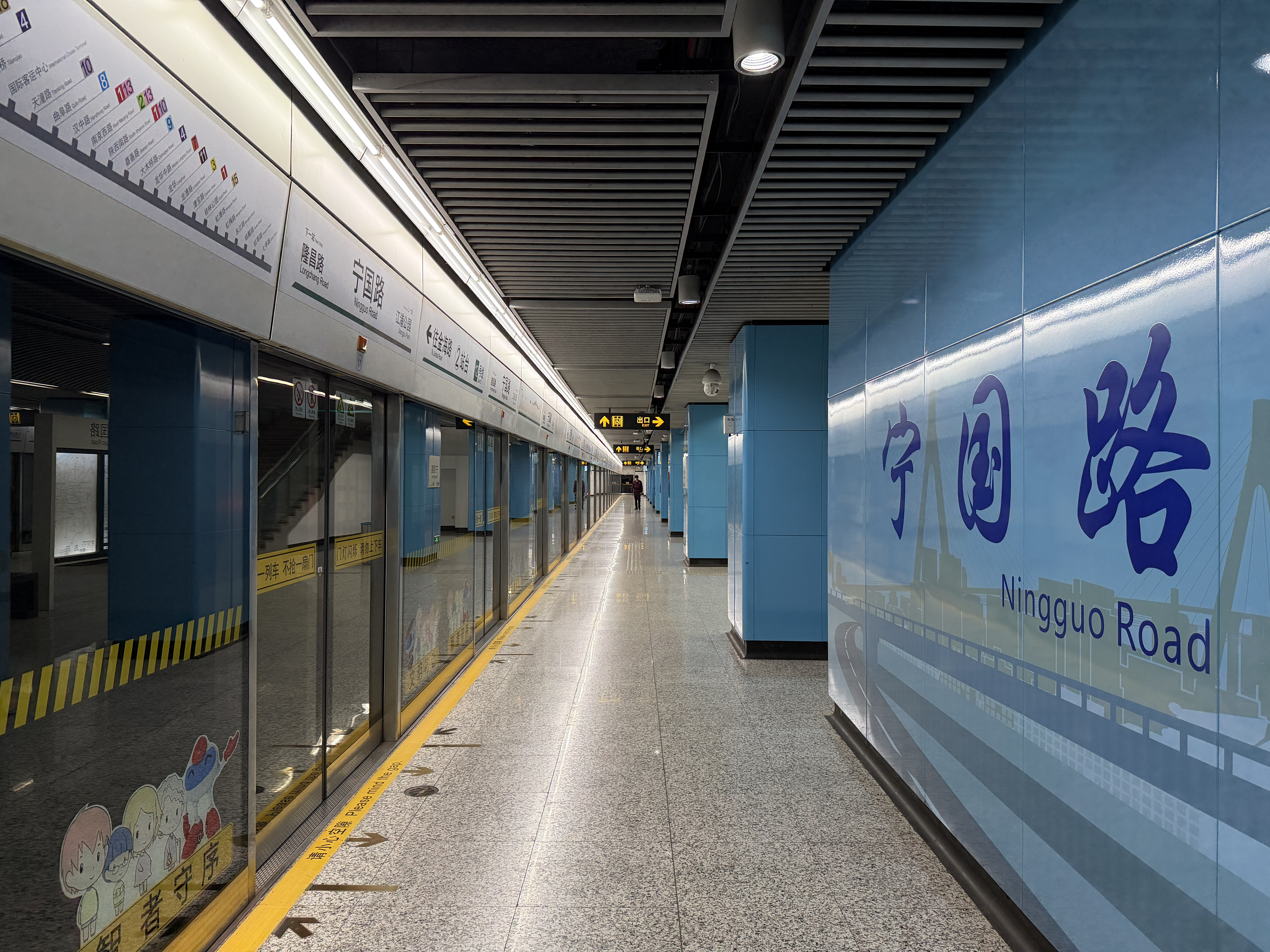
- Station platform

General information
- Location: Changyang Road and Ningguo Road; Yangpu District, Shanghai; China
- Coordinates: 31.27073°N 121.52818°E
- Line: Line 12
- Platforms: 2 (1 island platform)
- Tracks: 2

Construction
- Structure type: Underground
- Accessible: Yes

History
- Opened: 29 December 2013

Services
Preceding station	Shanghai Metro	Following station
Jiangpu Park towards Qixin Road	Line 12	Longchang Road towards Jinhai Road
Location

Ningguo Road (simplified Chinese: 宁国路; traditional Chinese: 寧國路; pinyin: Níngguó Lù) is a Shanghai Metro station located on Line 12 in Yangpu District, Shanghai. Located at the intersection of Changyang Road and Ningguo Road, the station opened on 29 December 2013, as part of an initial fifteen station-long segment of Line 12 between Tiantong Road and Jinhai Road stations.
