= Longchang Road station =

Shanghai Metro station

Longchang Road 隆昌路
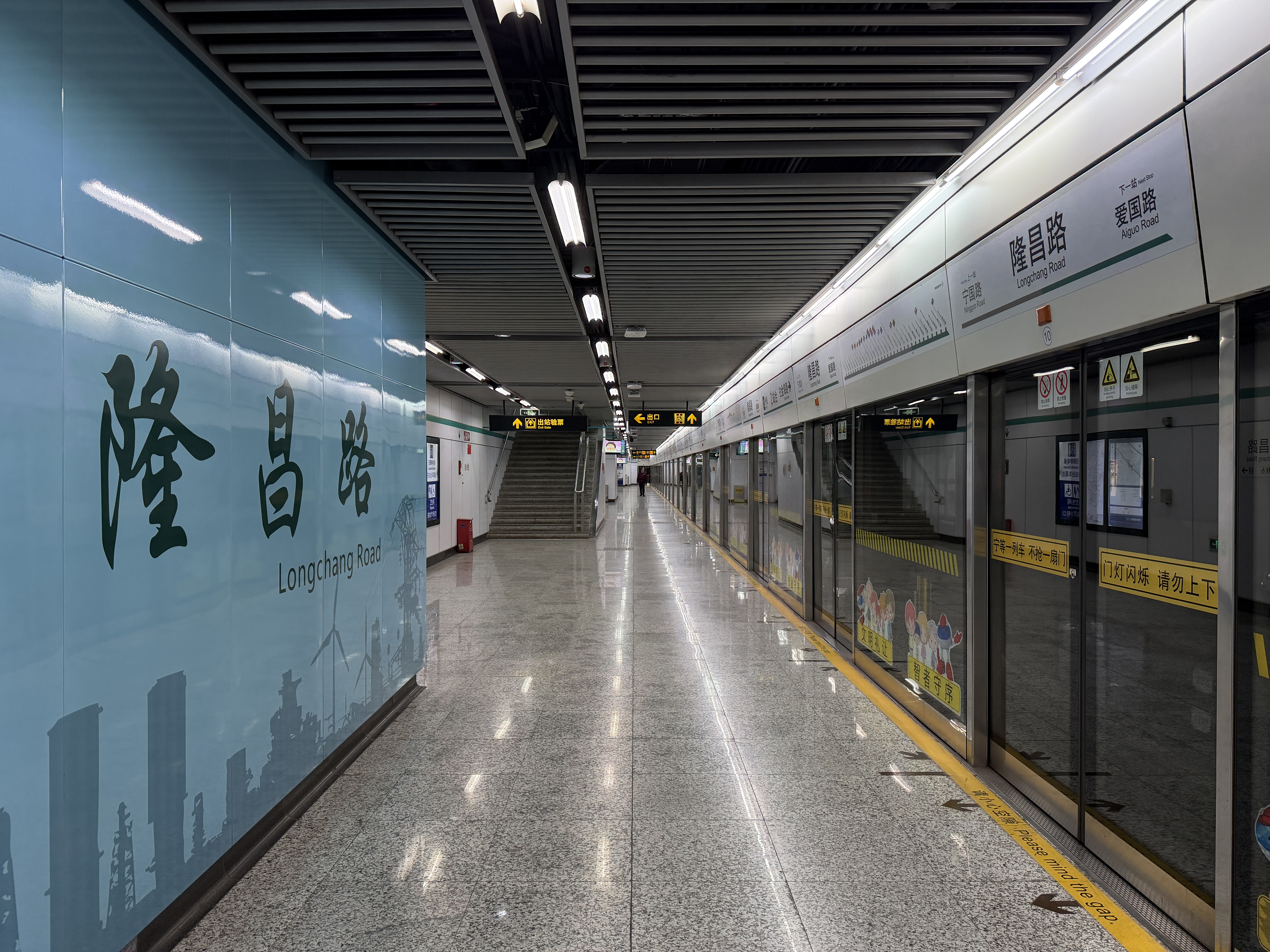
- Station platform

General information
- Location: Changyang Road and Longchang Road; Yangpu District, Shanghai; China
- Coordinates: 31.27726°N 121.54039°E
- Line: Line 12
- Platforms: 2 (2 side platforms)
- Tracks: 2

Construction
- Structure type: Underground
- Accessible: Yes

History
- Opened: 29 December 2013

Services
Preceding station	Shanghai Metro	Following station
Ningguo Road towards Qixin Road	Line 12	Aiguo Road towards Jinhai Road
Location

Longchang Road (Chinese: 隆昌路; pinyin: Lóngchāng Lù) is a Shanghai Metro station located on Line 12 in Yangpu District, Shanghai. Located at the intersection of Changyang Road and Longchang Road, the station opened on 29 December 2013, as part of an initial fifteen station-long segment of Line 12 between Tiantong Road and Jinhai Road stations.
