= Yangshupu Waterworks =

Waterworks in Shanghai, China

Coordinates: 31.252561°N 121.526974°E

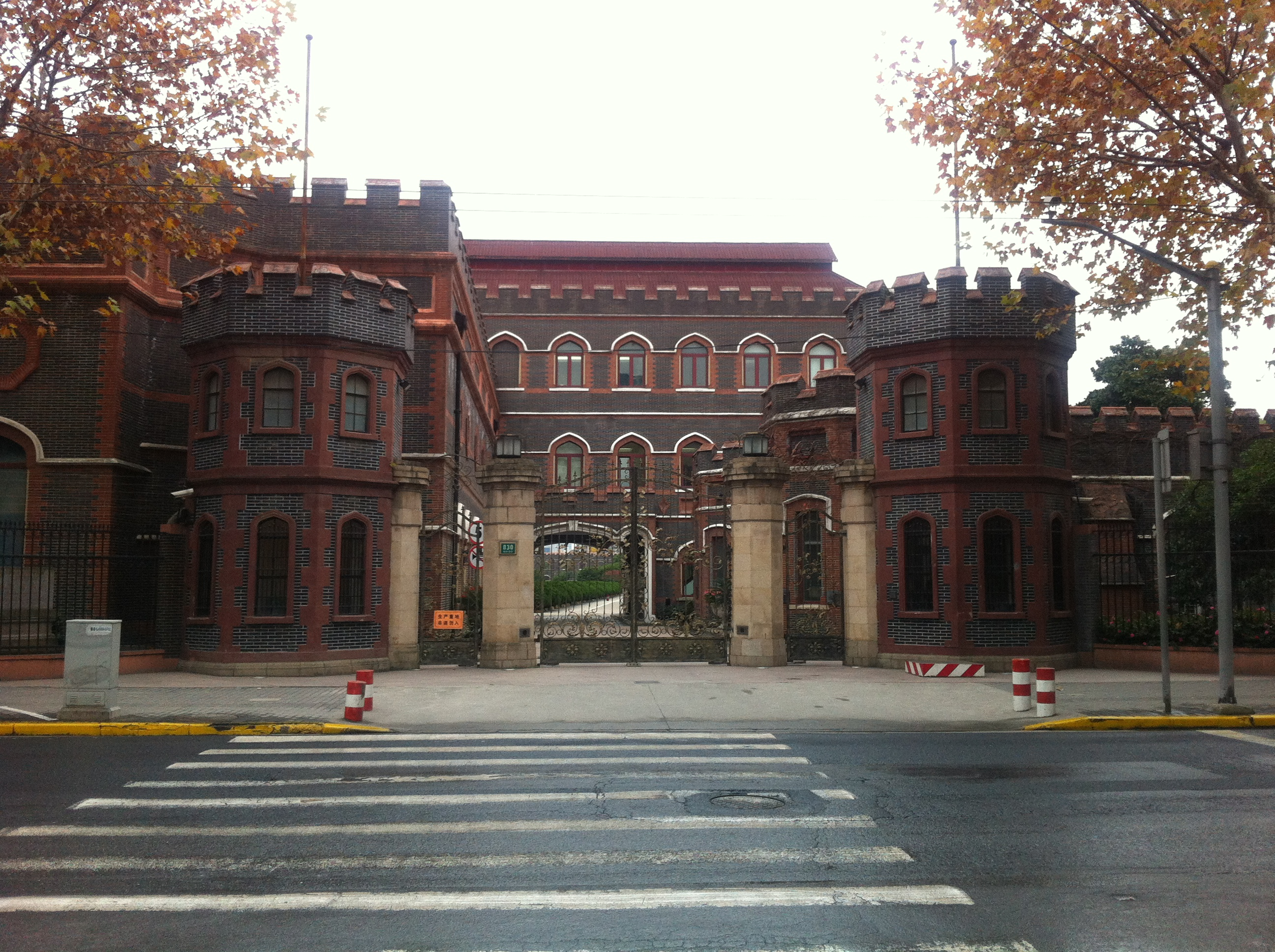
The main entrance to the waterworks.

The Yangshupu Waterworks (Chinese: 杨树浦水厂) is a waterworks built in 1883, and located at 830 Yangshupu Road (杨树浦路830号) in the district of Yangpu, Shanghai, China. The waterworks was the first of its kind to be built in China and provided running water for the first time to some of the cities' residents. It belongs to the Shanghai Water Company and occupies a site of 32 acres and has four major lines of tap water allowing for a maximum capacity of around 1.5 million cubic metres a day. In 2009 it supplied 400 million cubic metres of water, about 20% of the total water supply of Shanghai.

In 2013, the site was designated as a Major Historical and Cultural Site Protected at the National Level by the State Council of China, one of 28 sites in Shanghai. The site is also of importance due to the effect it had on China's early modern industries in the 1880s and 1890s, with many factories being built around the waterworks providing electricity, gas, vehicles and textiles. It is regarded as the birthplace of China's modern industry by the Shanghai municipal government. Furthermore, the site is protected due to its unique architecture.

To the east and west of the waterworks used to lie the docks. The waterworks lie to the south west of the Yangshupu Power Station.

== History ==
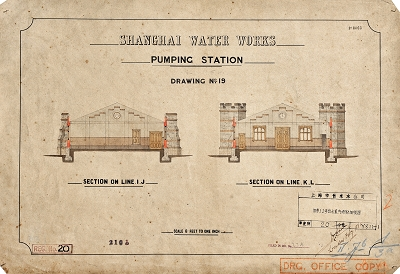
A drawing of the planned pumping station from 1880 or 1881.

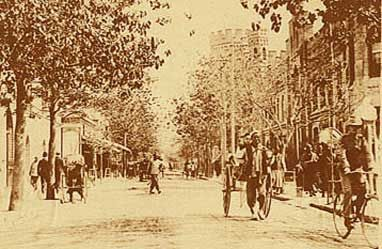
The waterworks during the late Qing dynasty period of either the 1890s or 1910s.

In 1880 the Shanghai Waterworks Co. Ltd were founded in London, United Kingdom. British and Chinese engineers provided expertise with British investors providing the funds, to build a waterworks in Shanghai in what was at that time the Shanghai International Settlement, a merging of the previous British and American settlement areas which had existed before 1863. Building started in August 1881 and the design was carried out by the British architect J.W. Hart (赫德), in the style of an English castle. The plant received a raw water intake from the Huangpu River, two settling reservoirs, a service tank, four filter-beds, and a pure water reservoir.

On 29 June 1883, Li Hongzhang the Viceroy of Zhili of the Qing Dynasty, opened the water gate valve and thus opened the waterworks. It was the first waterworks to be built in China, and at the time of its construction the largest in East Asia. Chinese businessmen who had quickly seen the benefits of the waterworks soon after completion played an important part in the development of similar waterworks in Tianjin, Hankou and Guangzhou. During the 1930s the site was much larger spanning 64 acres.

At the beginning of its construction, the plant was able to satisfy the daily water needs of 170,000 people in the Shanghai International Settlement and Shanghai French Concession in the first year of operation, the total water output of the plant reached 556,000 cubic meters. Since the beginning of 1902, when the Shanghai French Concession got its own waterworks, the Yangshupu Waterworks gradually stopped supplying water to the area within one month.

In 1911, Zhabei Waterworks (闸北水厂) was built to the west of Yangshupu Waterworks on Hengfeng Road. It supplied water to residents and factories on that side of the city, decreasing the usage of the Yangshupu Waterworks. In 1926 the waterworks in Zhabei were moved to their present location on Zhayin Road.

By the 1950s, the waterworks was providing around 300,000 cubic metres of water a day.

For 151 days between 1 October 1978 and 31 May 1979, the waterworks were affected by saltwater intrusion from the Changjiang River. Nearby waterworks in Wusong and Minhang were also affected. A similar incursion occurred briefly in 1988.

Jiang Zemin in his role as Mayor of Shanghai, visited the waterworks in 1985.

On 10 March 2001, for the first time in its history the waterworks opened its gates to the general public. Several thousand Shanghai residents applied for tickets.

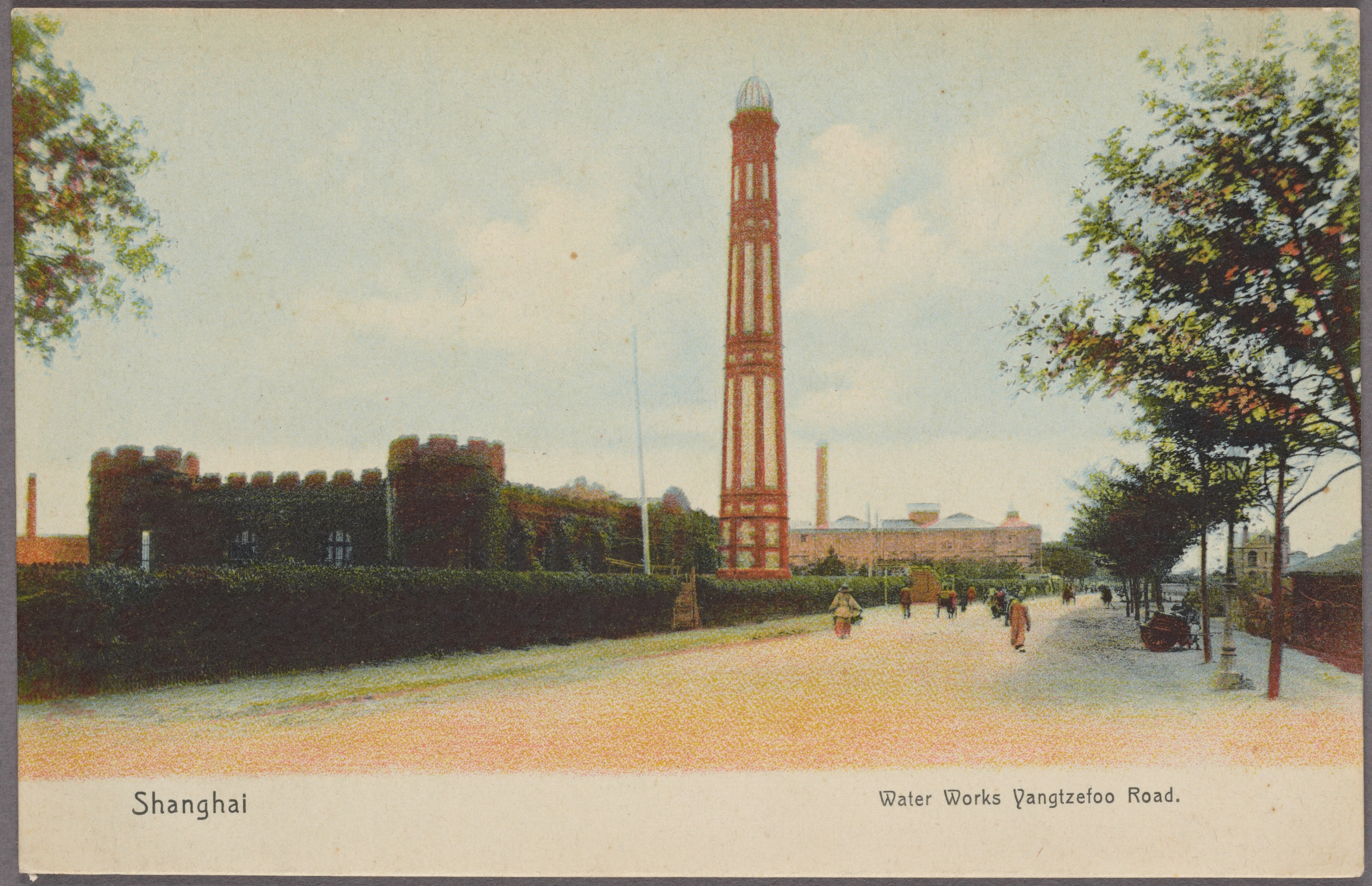

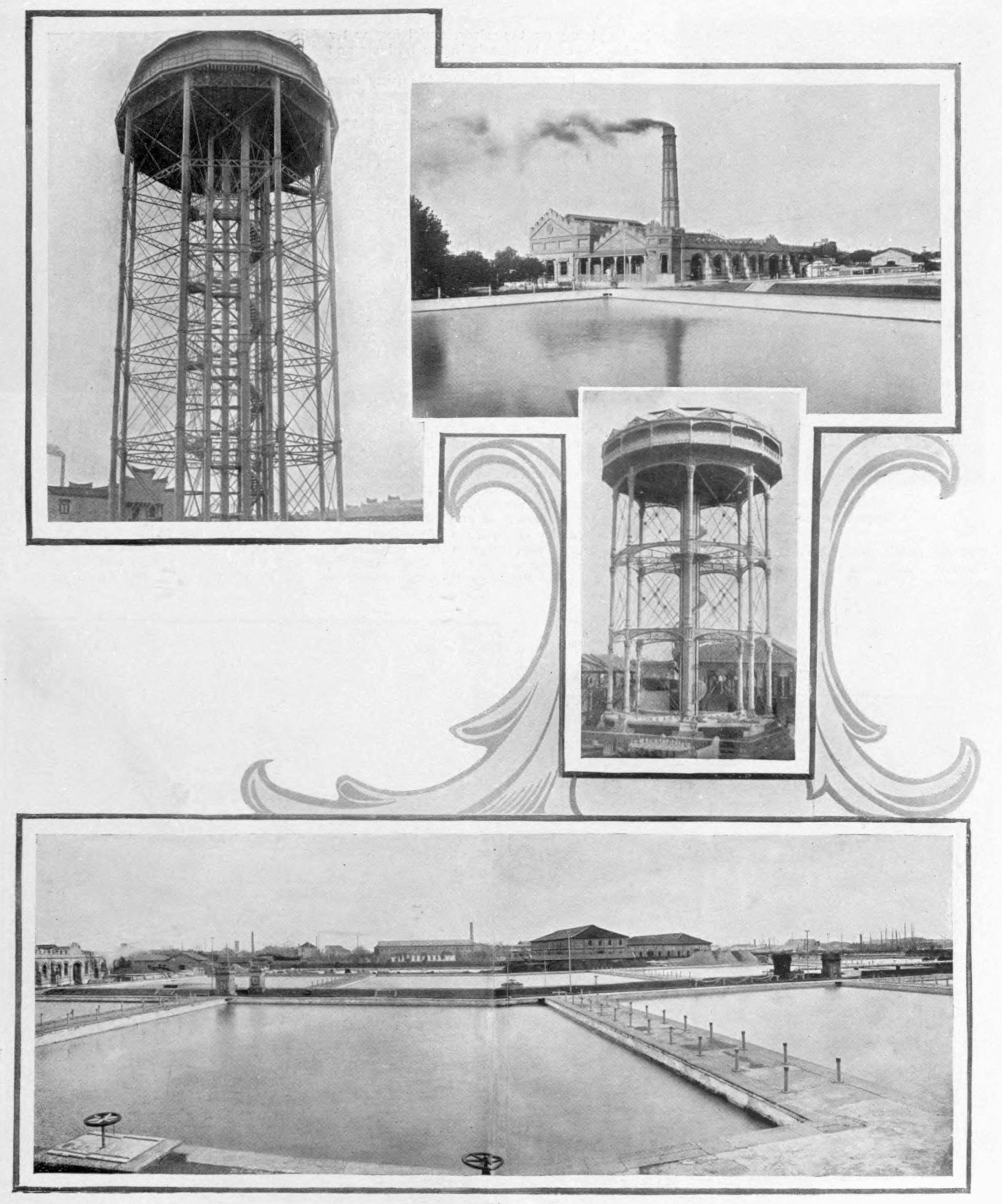

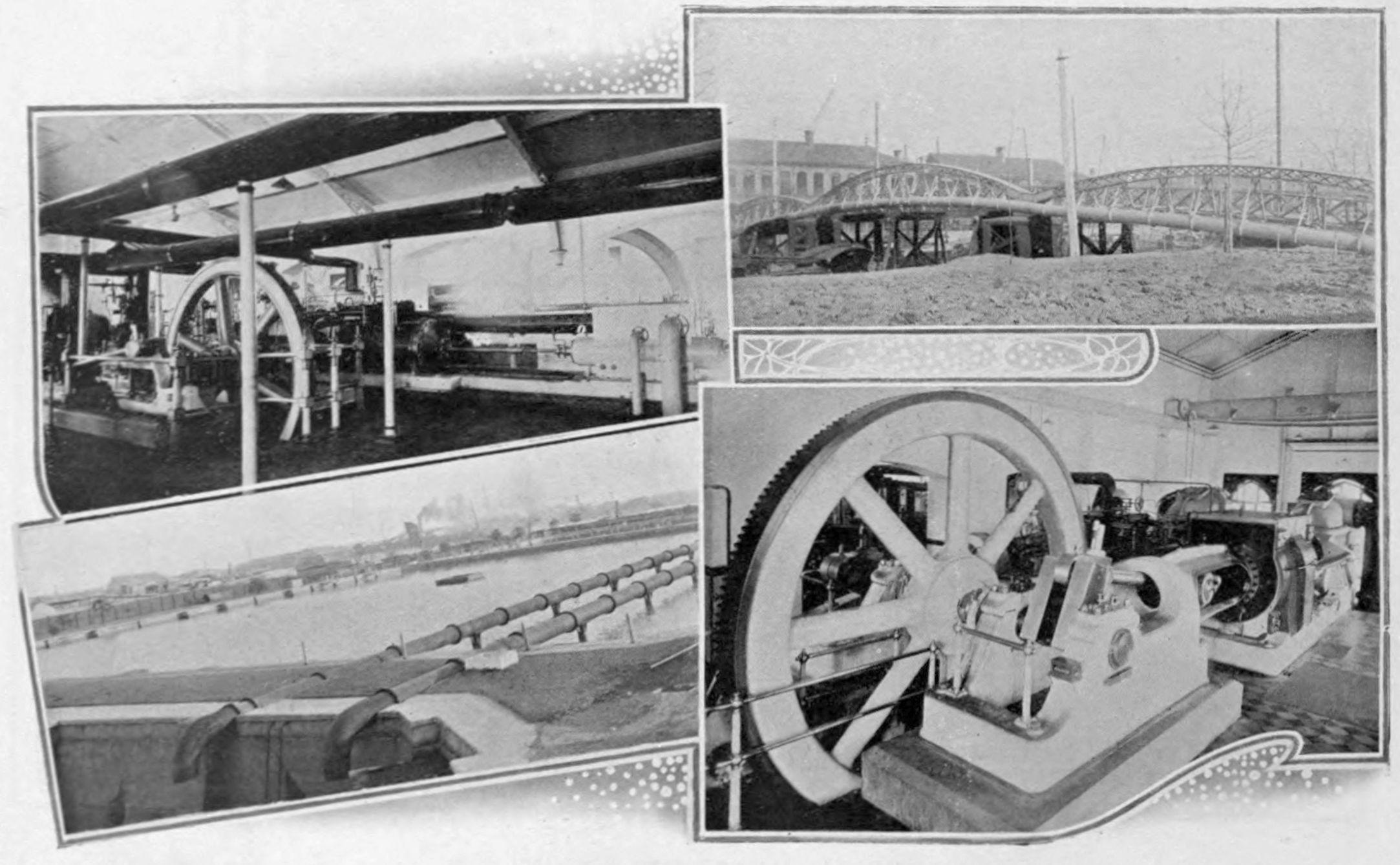

== Architecture ==
The buildings and its perimeter wall were designed to resemble English castles featuring pink and grey brickwork and mock turrets. At the top of the walls and on the roofs are crenellation to resemble a castle's parapet.

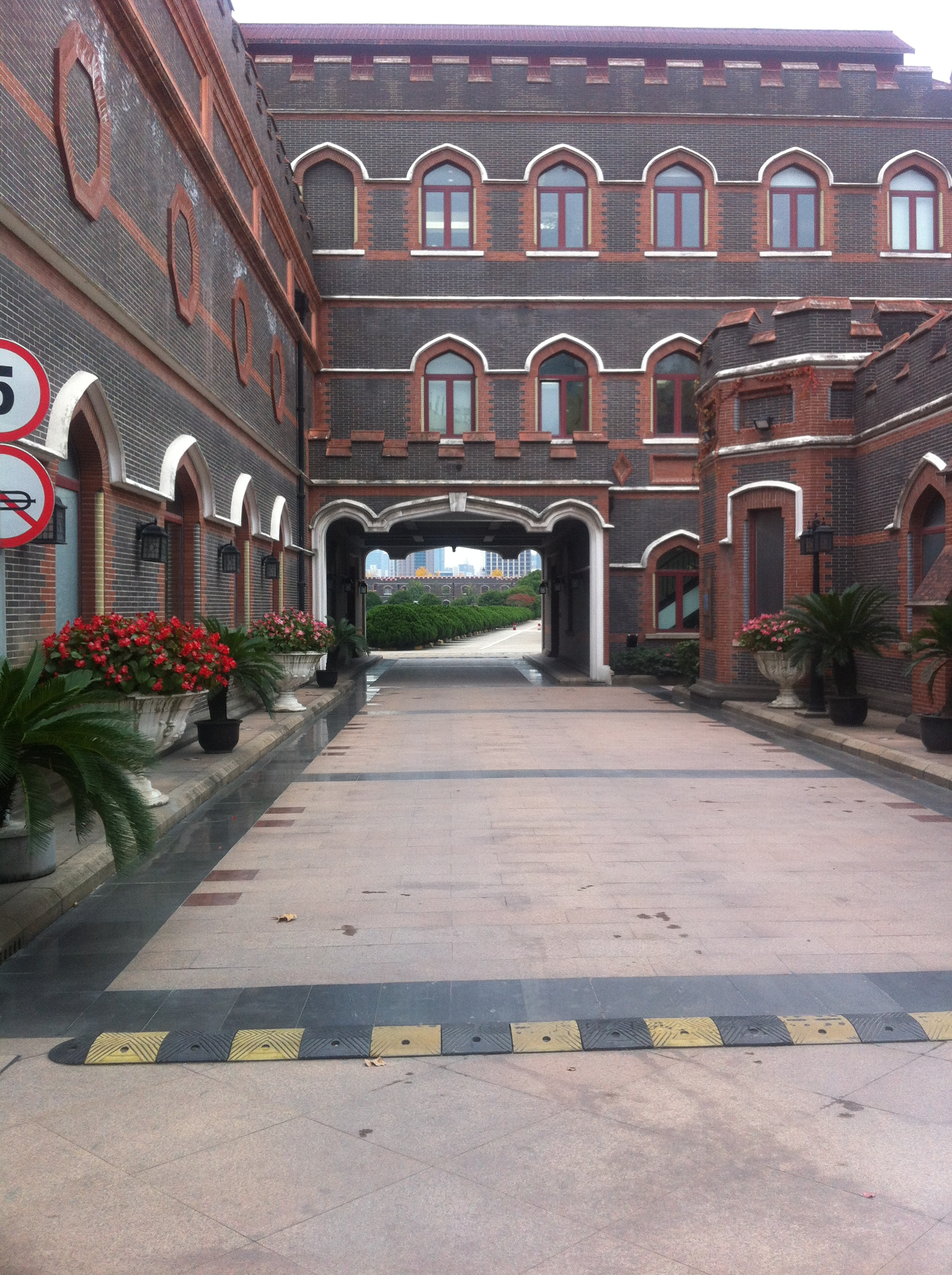

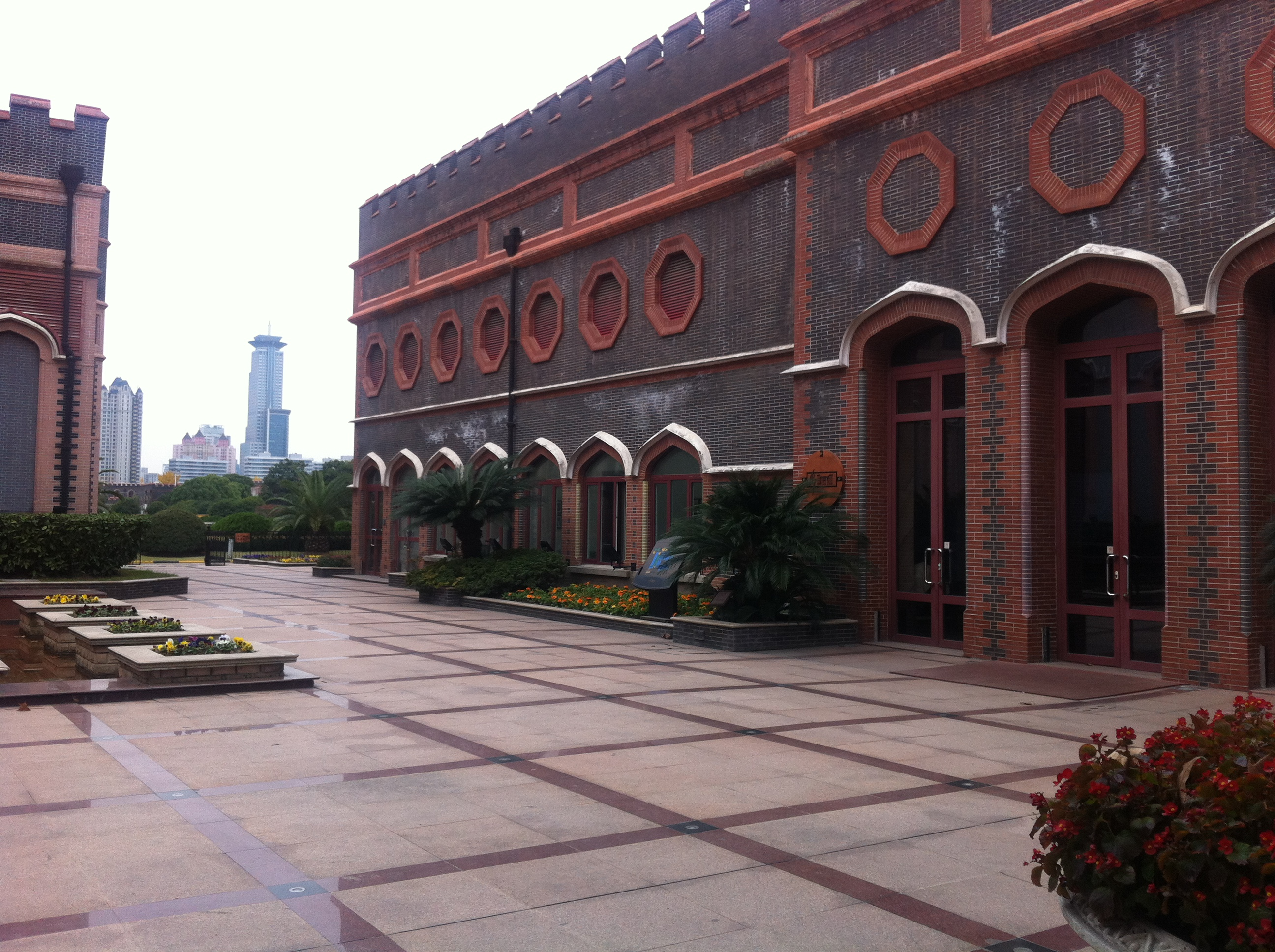

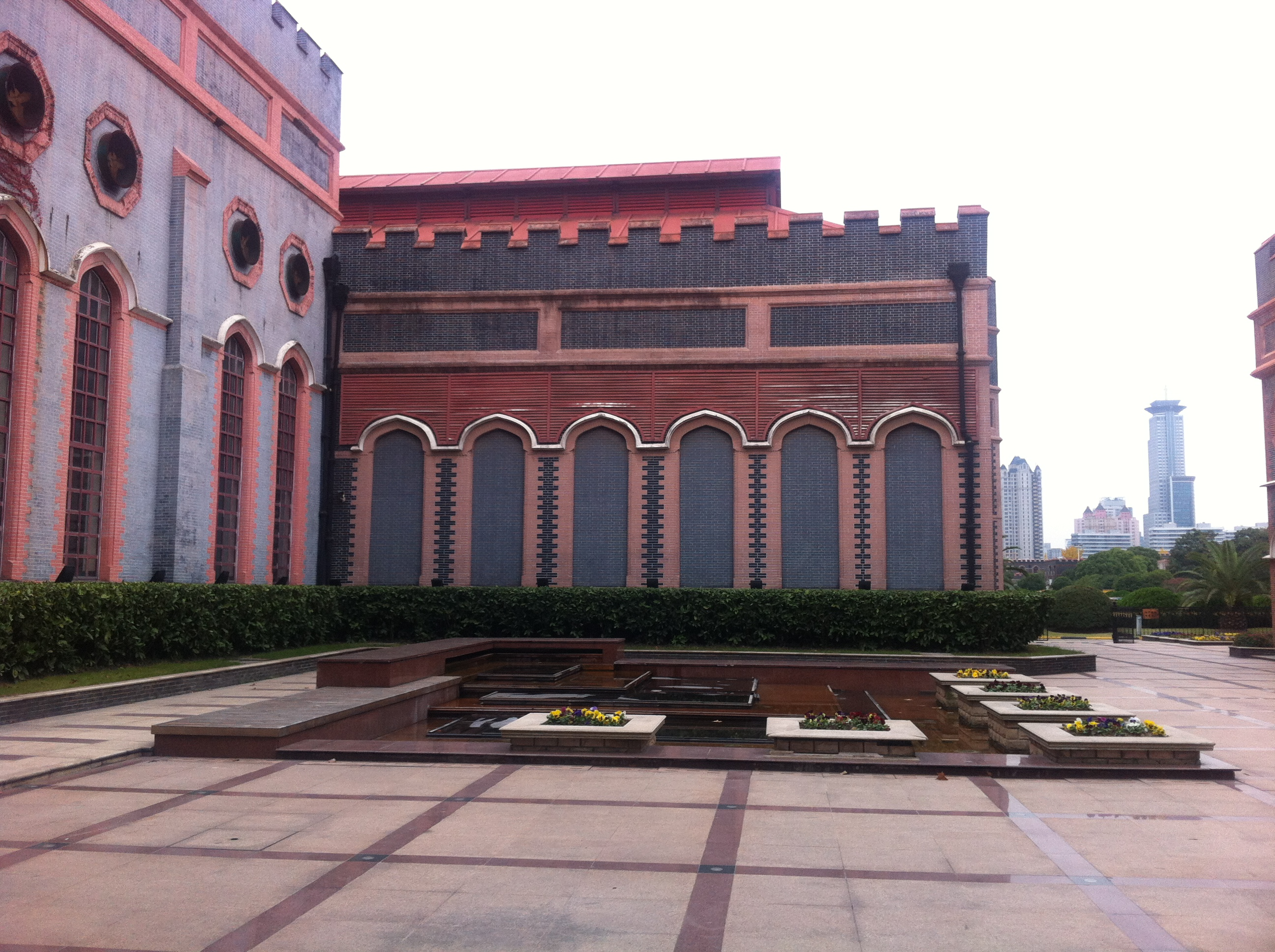

== Protection ==
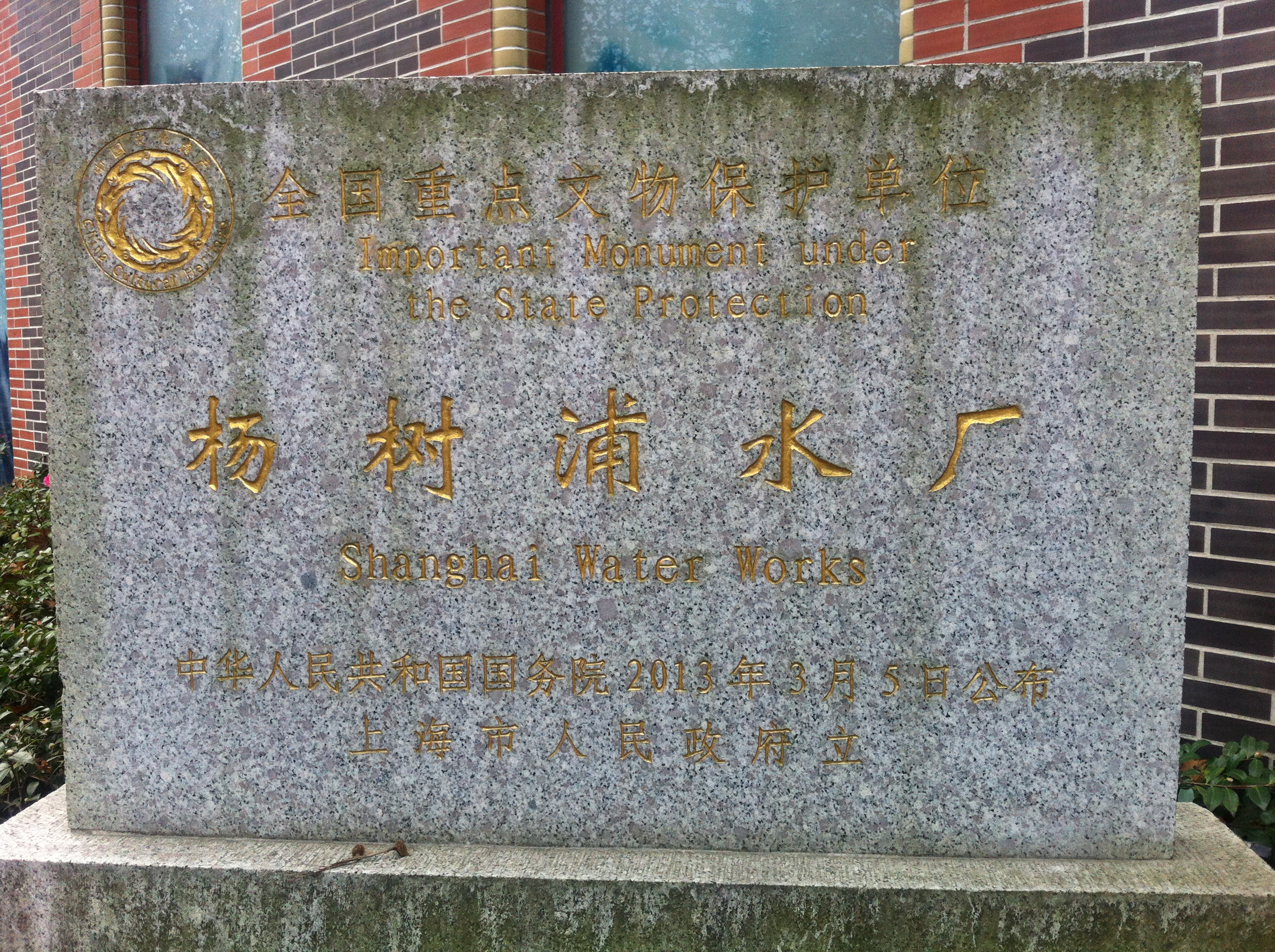
State protection plaque.

In 1989, the site was designated a monument of importance for the city of Shanghai, and became protected and preserved as a historical site by the Shanghai city government.

In 2013, the site was designated (7-1694) a Major Historical and Cultural Site Protected at the National Level by the State Council of China, giving it national protection.

== Shanghai Waterworks Science and Technology Museum ==
Location: No.830 Yangshupu Road, Yangpu, Shanghai

Some of the buildings of the site now host the Shanghai Waterworks Science and Technology Museum (上海自来水科技馆) which was opened in Autumn 2003. It has three exhibitions detailing the history, technology and future of the waterworks.

== Surroundings ==
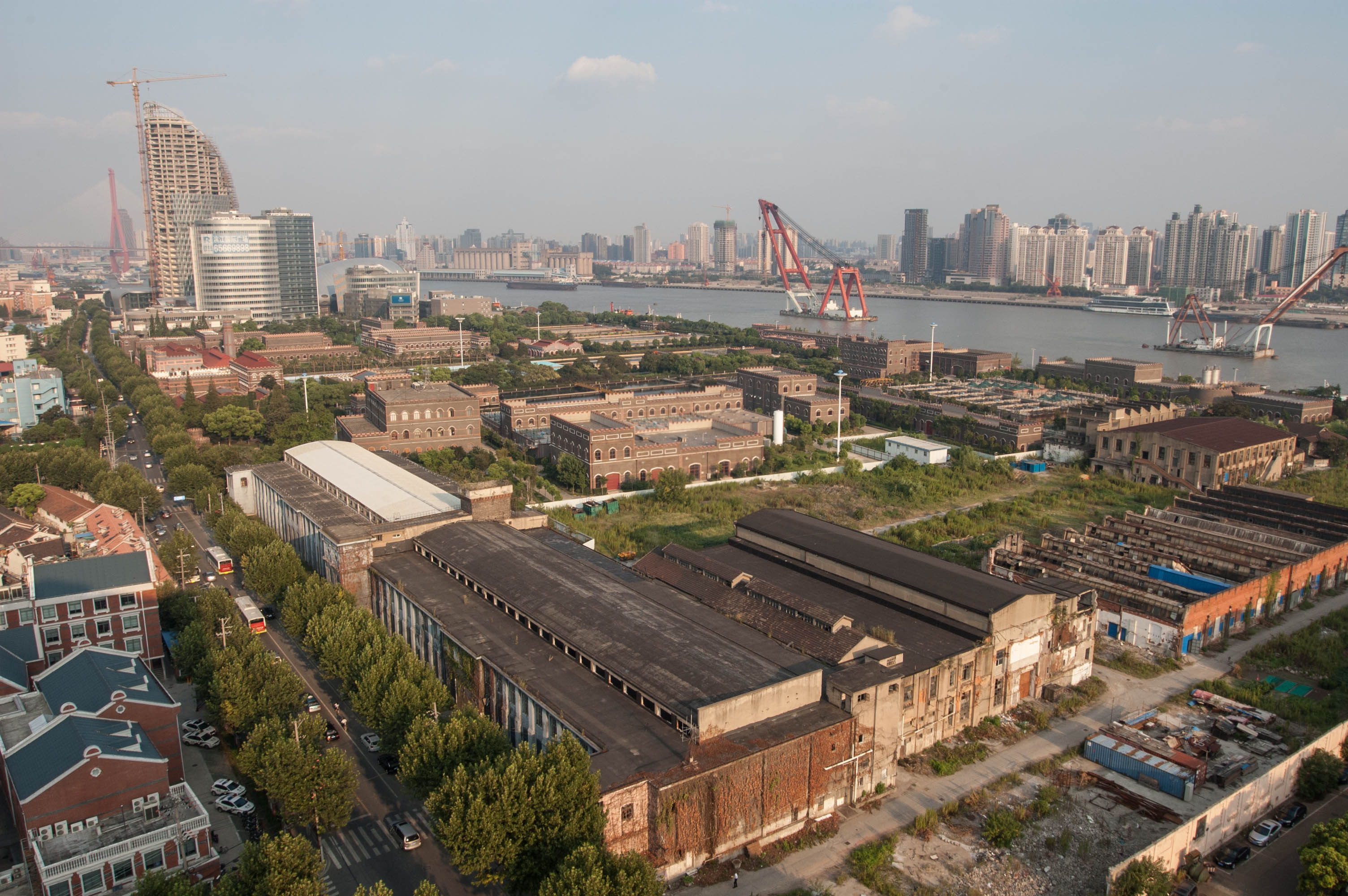
The waterworks is situated on the north bank of the river.

Due to the importance of its role in supplying running water, numerous factories and workshops were rapidly built around the Yangshupu Road, many of which were likewise the first of their kind in China. The most important are listed below:

- Yangshupu Shipyard (杨树浦船坞), built in 1862 and modernised in the 1880s.
- Shanghai Papermaking Factory (上海天章记录纸厂), built in 1882.
- Yangshupu Waterworks Workshop (杨树浦水厂车间), built in 1883.
- Shanghai No. 3 Silk Mill (上海第三丝织厂), built in 1888.
- Shanghai No. 5 Textile Mill (上海第五毛纺织厂), built in 1896.
- Shanghai No. 1 Silk Mill (上海第一丝织厂), built in 1898.
- Shanghai Power Station Auxiliary Engine Factory (上海电站辅机厂), built in 1912.
- Yangshupu Power Station (杨树浦发电厂), built in 1913.
- Shanghai No. 1 Wool Mill (上海第一毛条厂), built in 1915.
- Shanghai Soap Factory (上海制皂厂), built in 1923.
- Shanghai Tram Workshop (上海电车厂), built in 1925.
- Shanghai Naval Machinery Factory (上海中华造船厂工人加工舰艇部件), built in 1926.
- Yangshupu Gasworks (杨树浦煤气厂), built in 1933.
- Shanghai Fish Market (上海鱼市场), built in 1935.

Opposite the waterworks are the sites of:

- Shanghai Water Supply Trade Association (上海市供水行业协会)
- Shanghai Institute of Water Education (上海水务进修学校)

To the south of the waterworks, facing the Huangpu River where once the docks stood, is the Yangpu Riverside (杨浦滨江) park and promenade opened in 2017.
