= East Yingao Road station =

Shanghai Metro station

East Yingao Road 殷高东路
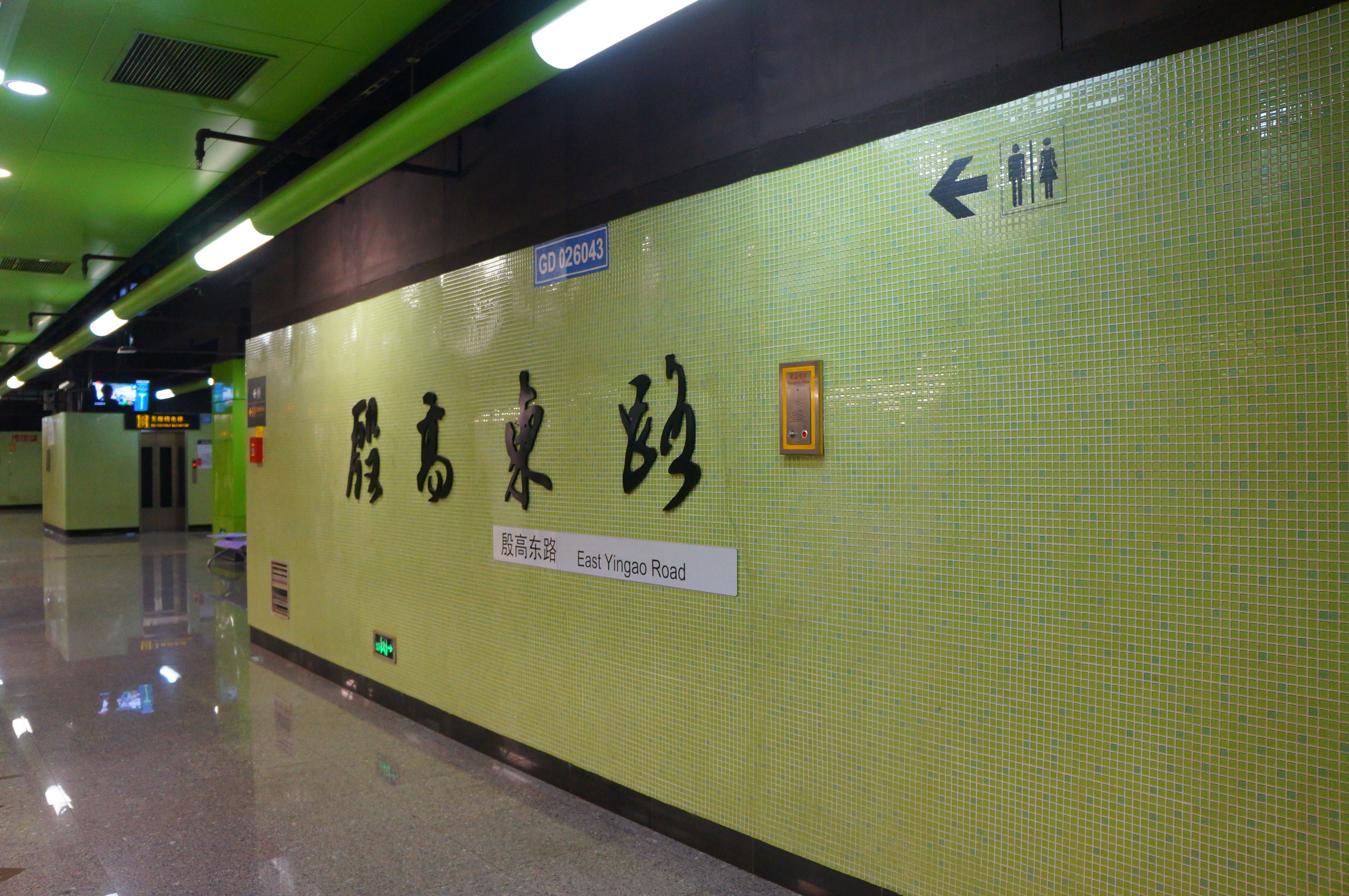
- Station platform

General information
- Location: East Yingao Road (殷高东路) and Songhu Road (淞沪路); Yangpu District, Shanghai; China
- Coordinates: 31.3236°N 121.502°E
- Operator: Shanghai No. 1 Metro Operation Co. Ltd.
- Line: Line 10
- Platforms: 2 (1 island platform)
- Tracks: 2

Construction
- Structure type: Underground
- Accessible: Yes

Other information
- Station code: L10/27

History
- Opened: 10 April 2010

Services
| Preceding station | Shanghai Metro | Following station |
|---|---|---|
| Sanmen Road towards Hongqiao Railway Station or Hangzhong Road | Line 10 | Xinjiangwancheng towards Jilong Road |
Location
- Location within Shanghai

East Yingao Road (simplified Chinese: 殷高东路; traditional Chinese: 殷高東路; pinyin: Yīngāo Dōng Lù) is a station on Line 10 of the Shanghai Metro. Located at the intersection of East Yingao Road and Songhu Road in the city's Yangpu District, it opened with the rest of the first phase of Line 10 on 10 April 2010.
