= Aiguo Road station =

Shanghai Metro station

Aiguo Road 爱国路
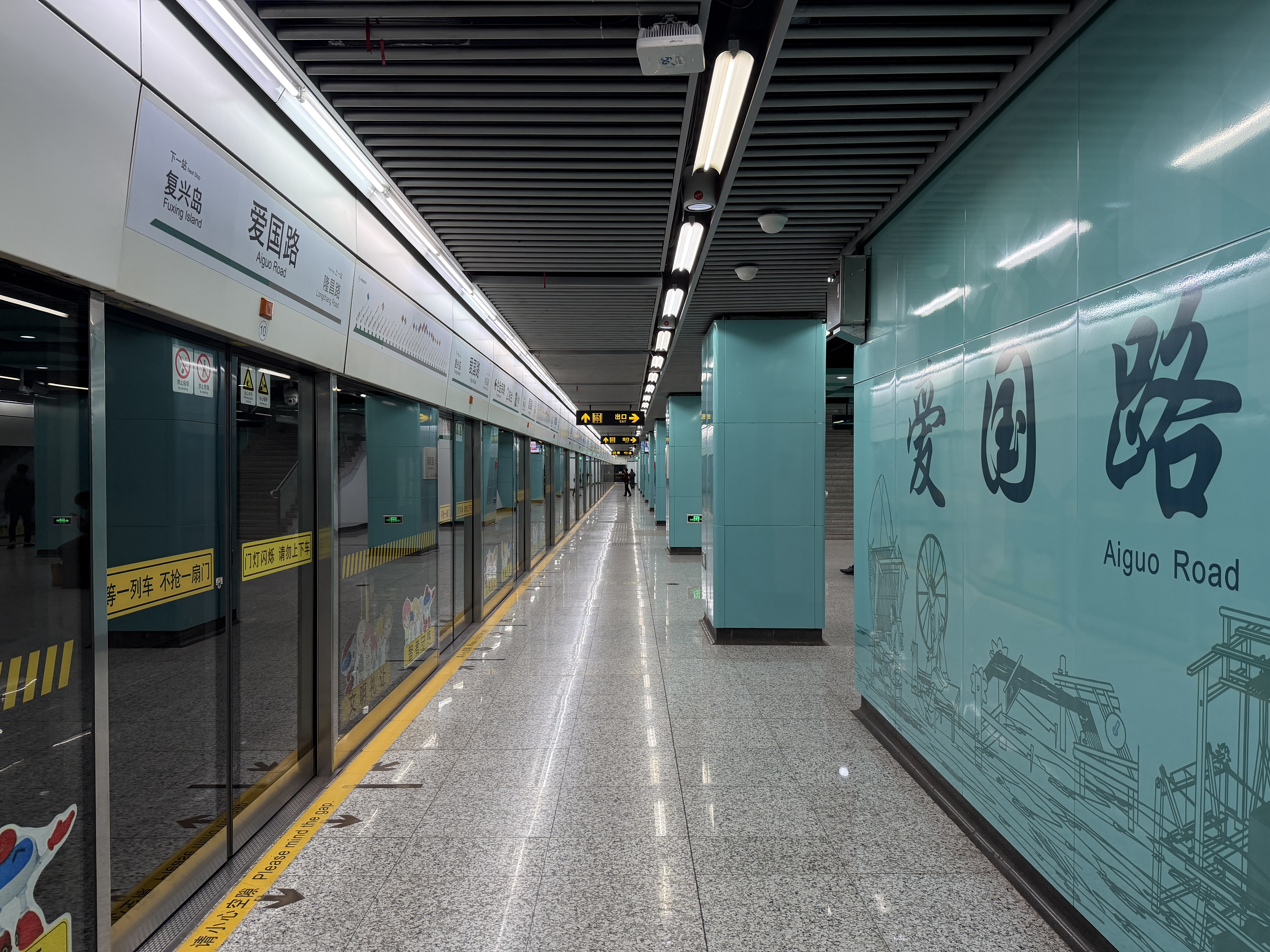
- Station platform

General information
- Location: Changyang Road and Aiguo Road; Yangpu District, Shanghai; China
- Coordinates: 31.28197°N 121.54832°E
- Line: Line 12
- Platforms: 2 (1 island platform)
- Tracks: 2

Construction
- Structure type: Underground
- Accessible: Yes

History
- Opened: 29 December 2013

Services
Preceding station	Shanghai Metro	Following station
Longchang Road towards Qixin Road	Line 12	Fuxing Island towards Jinhai Road
Location

Aiguo Road (simplified Chinese: 爱国路; traditional Chinese: 愛國路; pinyin: Àiguó Lù) is a station on Line 12 of the Shanghai Metro in Yangpu District, Shanghai. It is located at the intersection of Aiguo Road and Changyang Road.

== History ==
- During the planning stages of Line 12, the station was named Neijiang Road, but it was renamed Aiguo Road.
- 30 December 2008: the construction of Line 12 begins.
- 29 December 2013: the construction of the east part of Line 12 (including Aiguo Road Station) is completed and this station officially opens.

== Exits ==
There are four exits of the station.

Exits 1 and 2: Changyang Road

Exits 3 and 4: Changyang Road and Neijiang Road

== Places nearby ==
The following points of interest are near the station:

- Youth's Amateur Football School of Shanghai
- College of Administration of Yangpu District, Shanghai

== Structure of the station ==
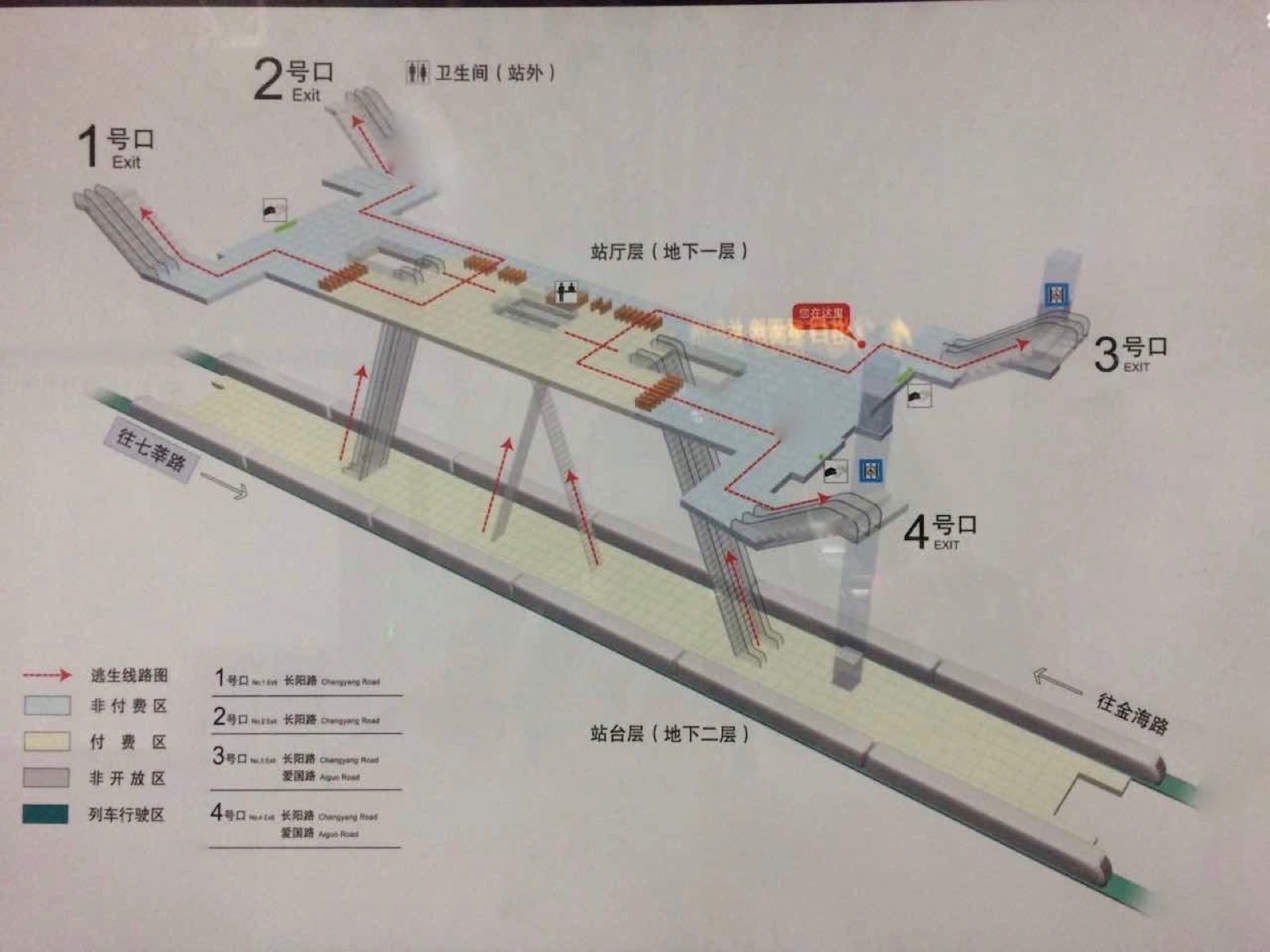
Map of the Structure of Aiguo Road Station. Taken on August 2, 2017.

It is available to enter the station via escalator, elevator or stairs. After passing through the wicket with security check machines installed in front of it and going downstairs, the platform of Line 12 going two ways (toward Qixin Road and toward Jinhai Road) can be seen.

== Gallery ==
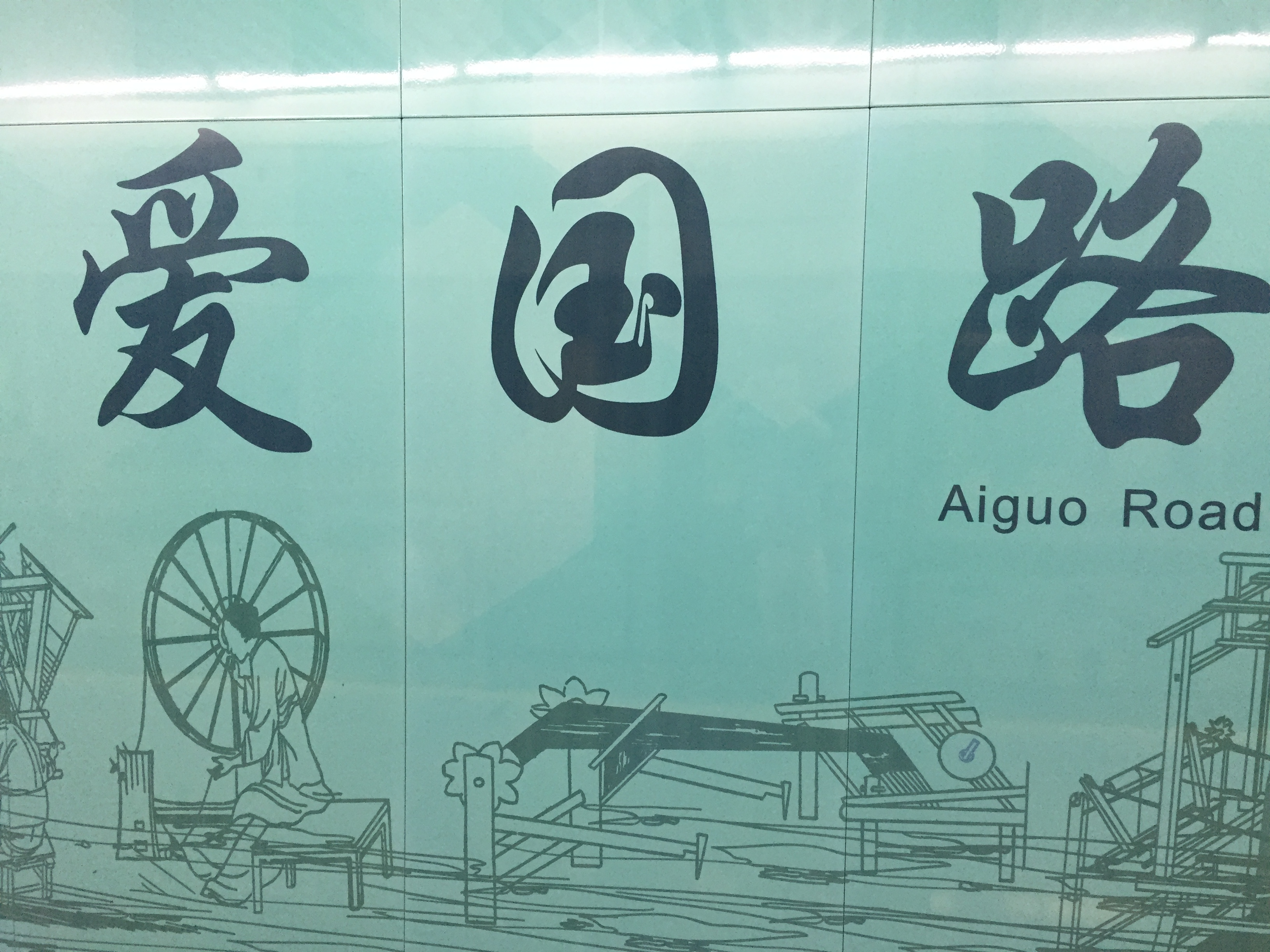
Name sign of Aiguo Road station

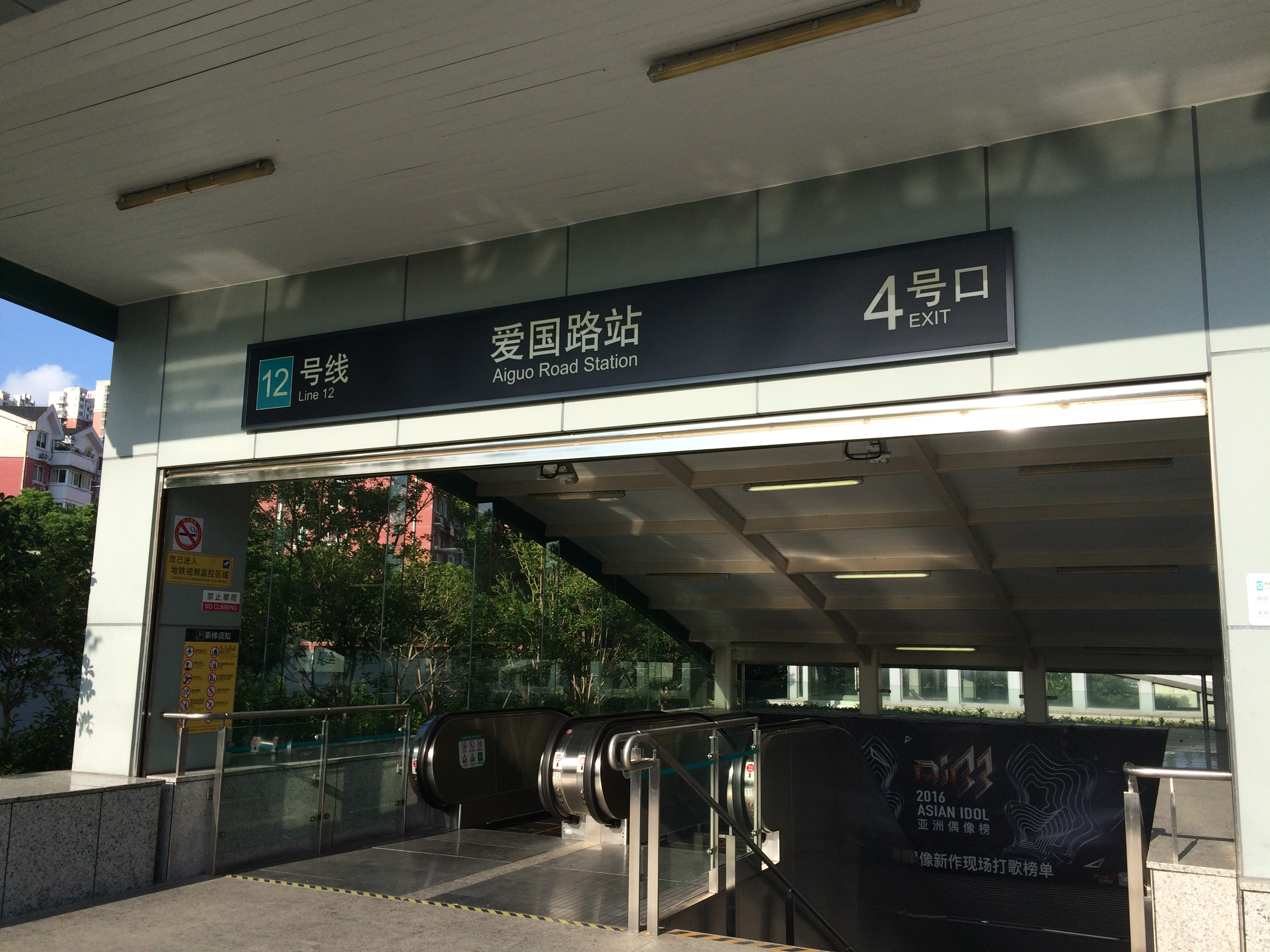
Exit 4 of Aiguo Road Station
