= Gongqing Forest Park =

Park in Shanghai, China

Coordinates: 31.321821°N 121.545769°E

Gongqing Forest Park (Chinese: 上海共青森林公园; pinyin: Shànghǎi Gòngqīng Sēnlín Gōngyuán) is the second-largest park in the city of Shanghai. It is located in the Yangpu District in the north section of the city. To reach the park you can take line 8 on the metro to Shiguang Road. From the metro station the park is a less than 1 km; walk or take a very short taxi ride to it. Being further out the park is somewhat less crowded than Century Park, the largest park of the city.

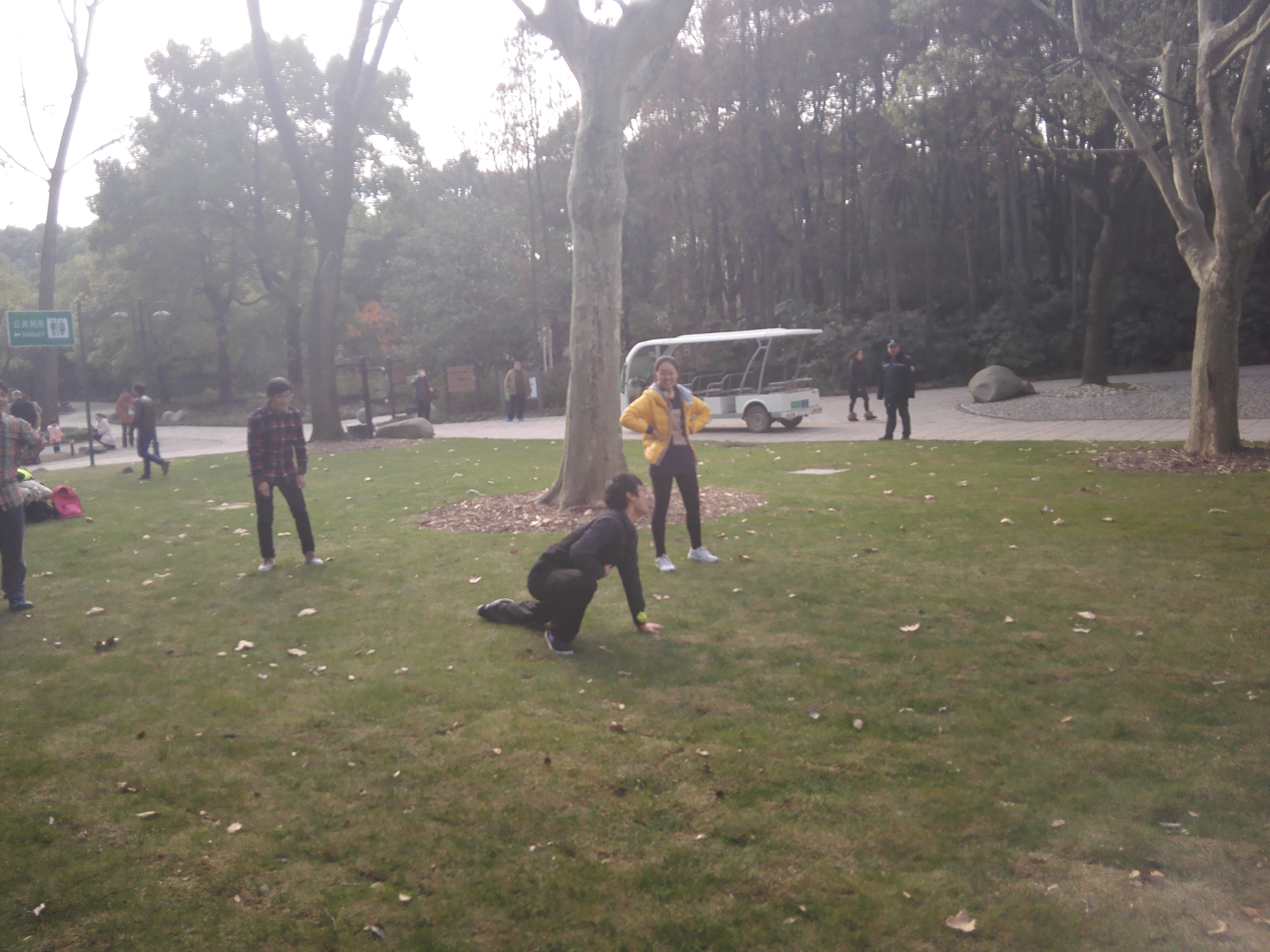
The lawn on Gongqing Forest Park

The northern part is the larger one and features most of the amusements and activities of the park i.e., rock climbing, horse riding, kart racing, toboggan ride and roller coasters etc. The southern part is home to mini lakes and ponds. There is also an indoor exhibition of various plants and a Hongsen Forest Park Hotel.

One can take Metro Line 8 to Shiguang Road and after that walk approximately 1km to the park.
