= Danyang Road station =

Shanghai Metro station

Danyang Road 丹阳路
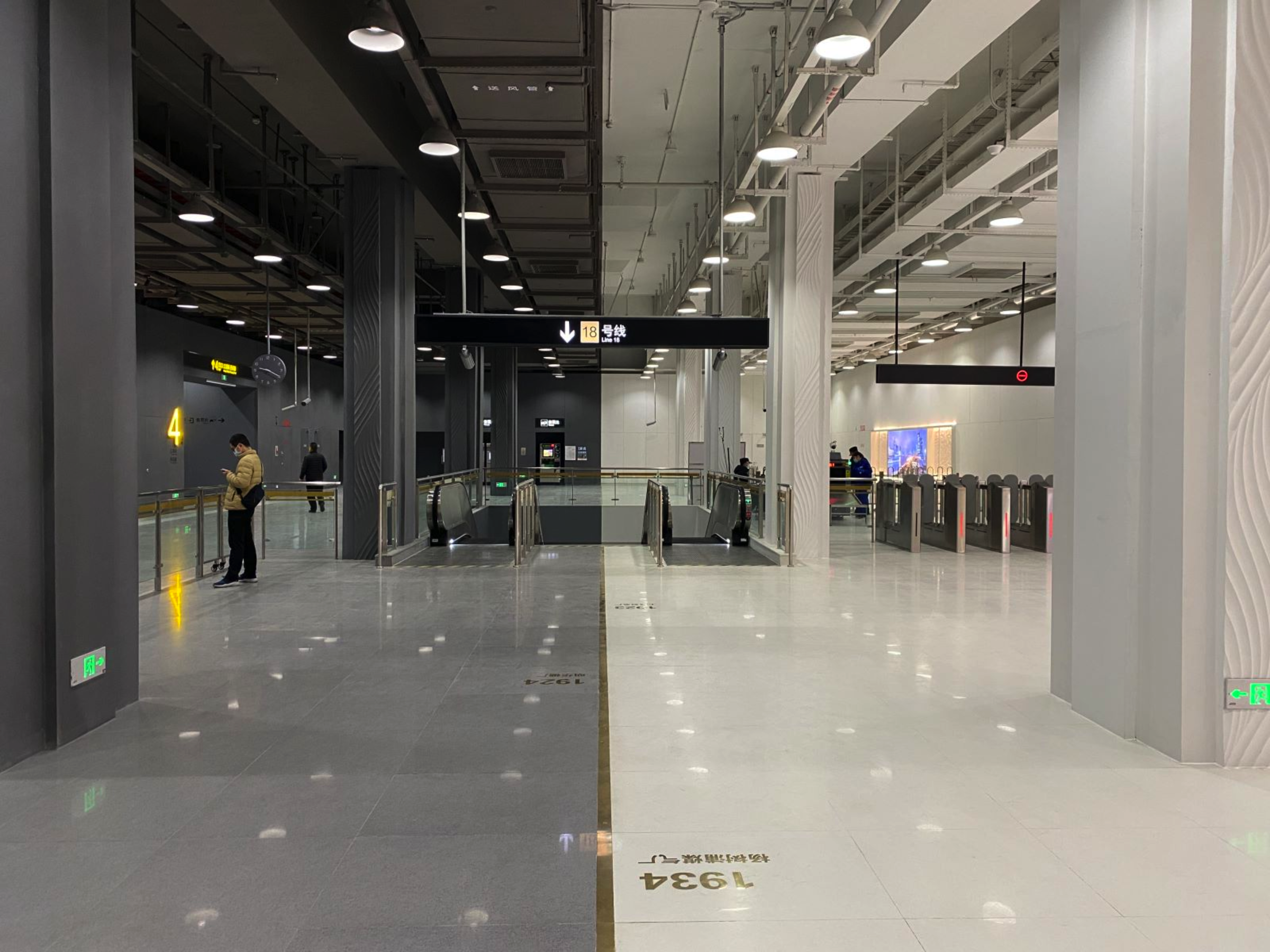

General information
- Location: Yangshupu Road and Jiangpu Road, Yangpu District, Shanghai; China
- Coordinates: 31.255537°N 121.527234°E
- Line: Line 18
- Platforms: 2 (1 island platform)
- Tracks: 2

Construction
- Structure type: Underground
- Accessible: Yes

History
- Opened: 30 December 2021

Services
Preceding station	Shanghai Metro	Following station
Pingliang Road towards Kangwen Road	Line 18	Changyi Road towards Hangtou
Location

Danyang Road (Chinese: 丹阳路) is a station as part of Line 18 of the Shanghai Metro. Located at the intersection of Yangshupu Road and Jiangpu Road in Yangpu District, Shanghai, the station opened with the rest of phase one of Line 18 on December 30, 2021. The station is named after the nearby Danyang Road, which intersects Jiangpu Road north of the station. To the south, the line crosses the Huangpu River into Pudong.

Danyang Road Station has a color design that is divided into two parts. The west side of the station is dark, while the east side of the station is a bright, representing the past and present of Yangpu riverside respectively. This contrast makes the station a popular photographic subject.
