= Yangpu, Shanghai =

Yangpu 杨浦区; 楊浦區 Yangtszepoo
- District
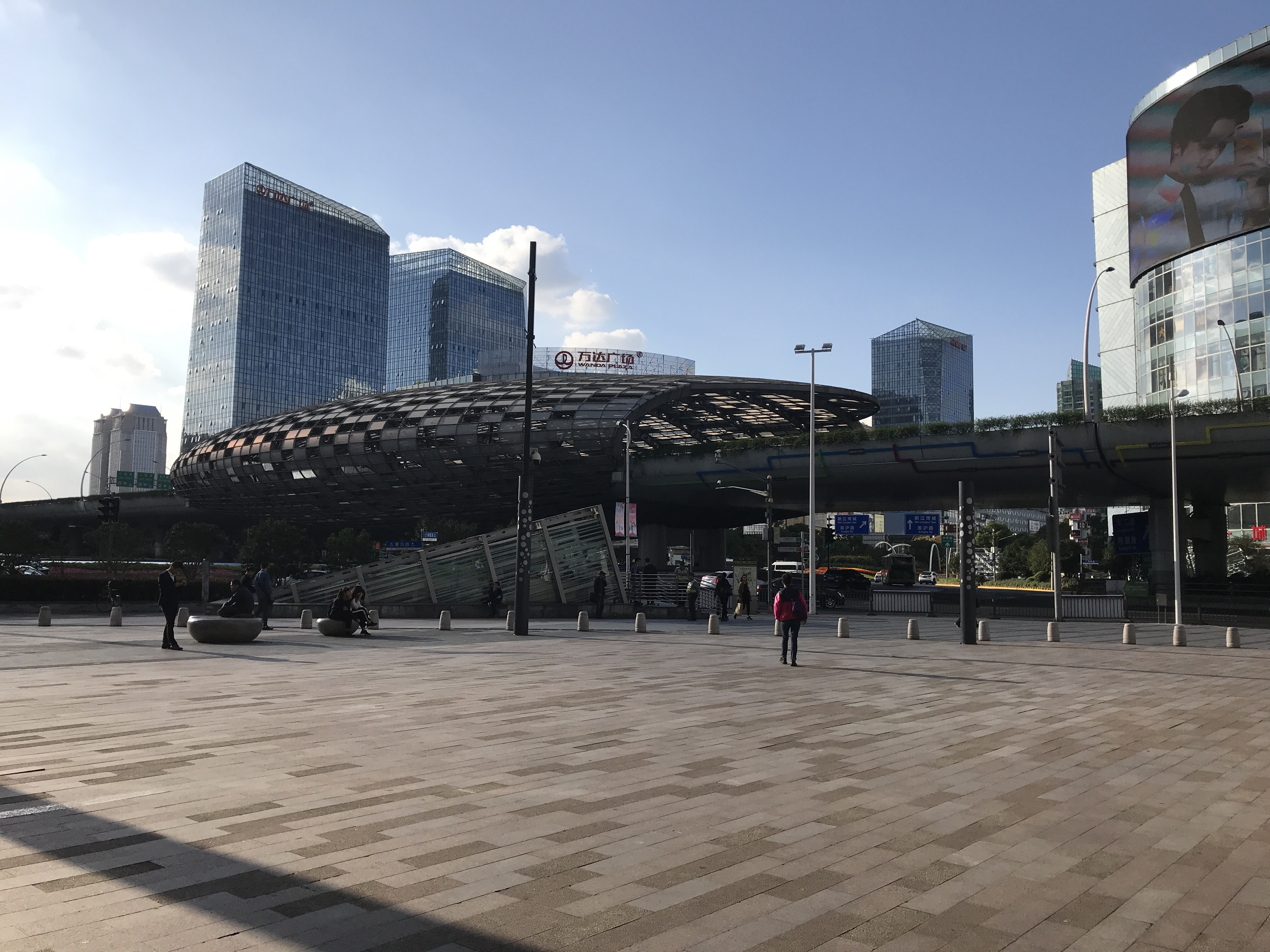
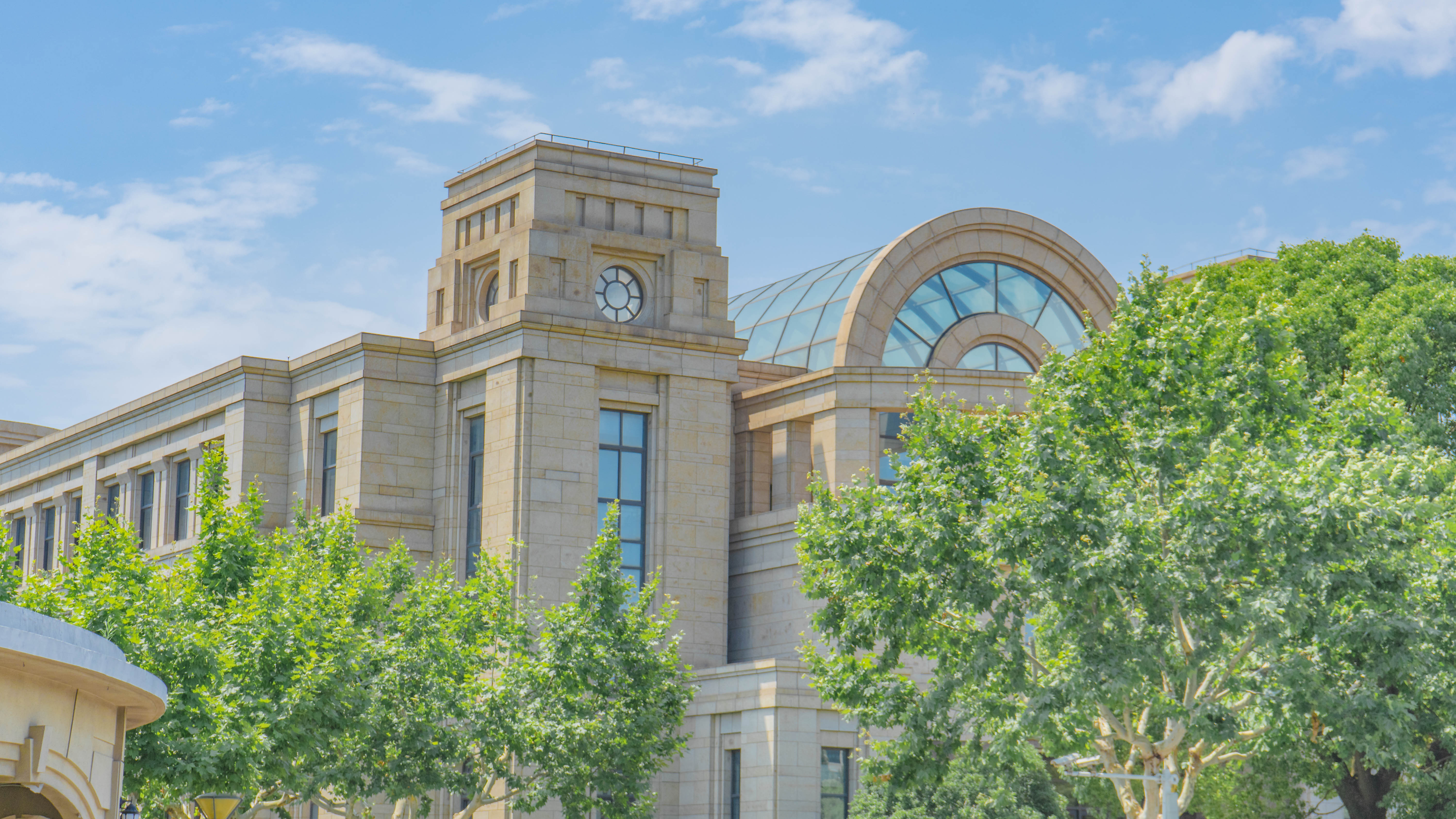
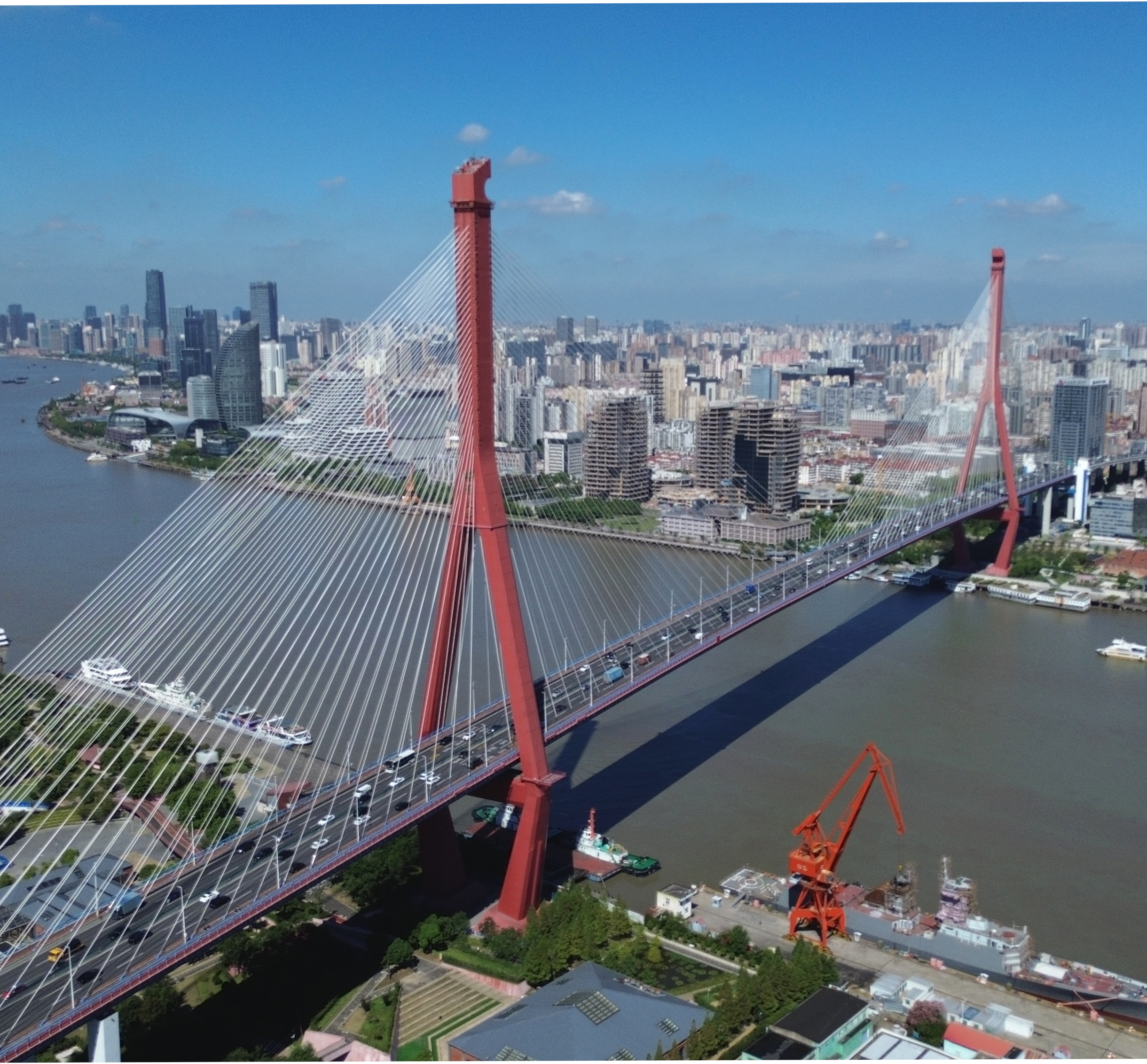
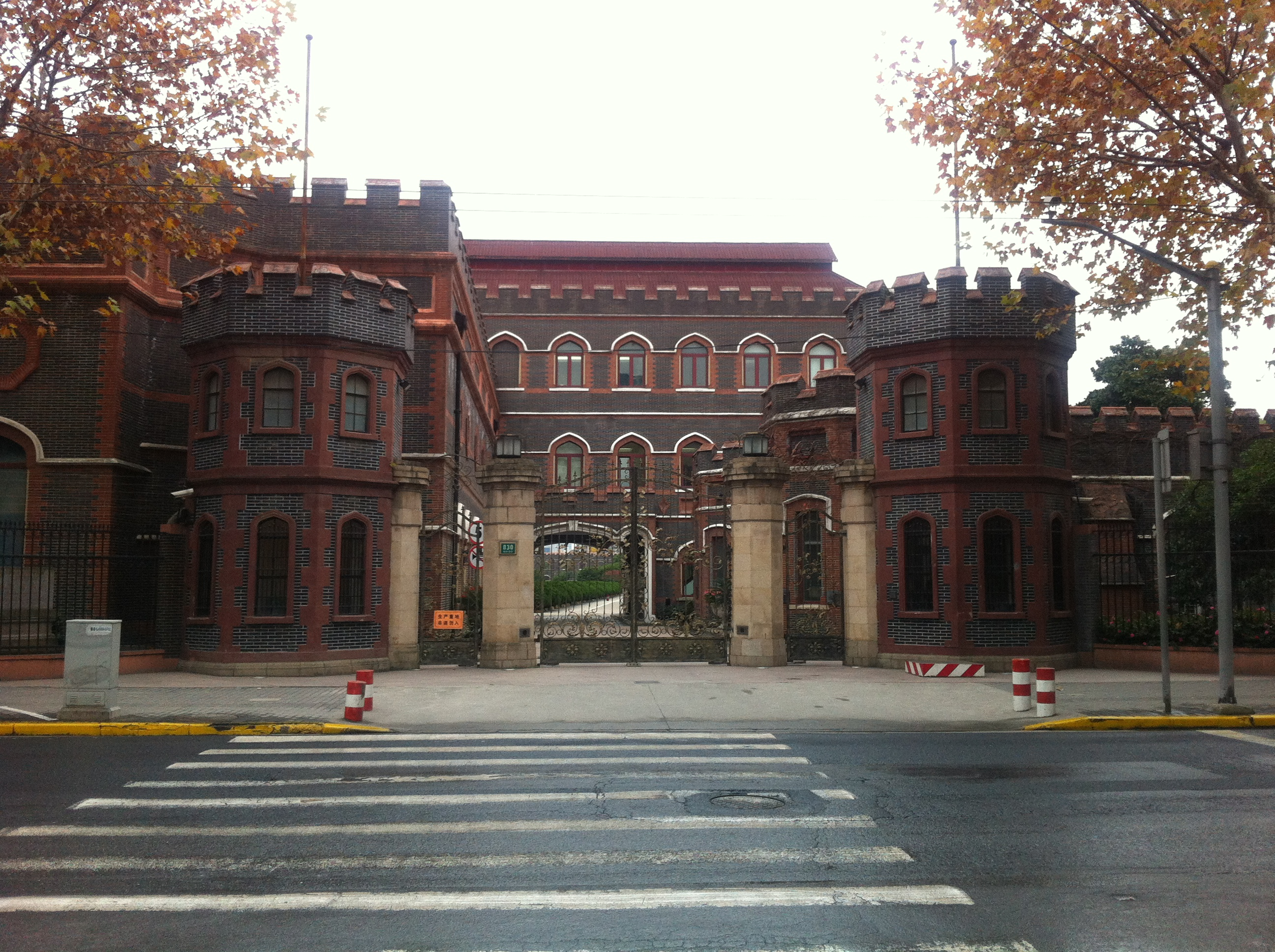
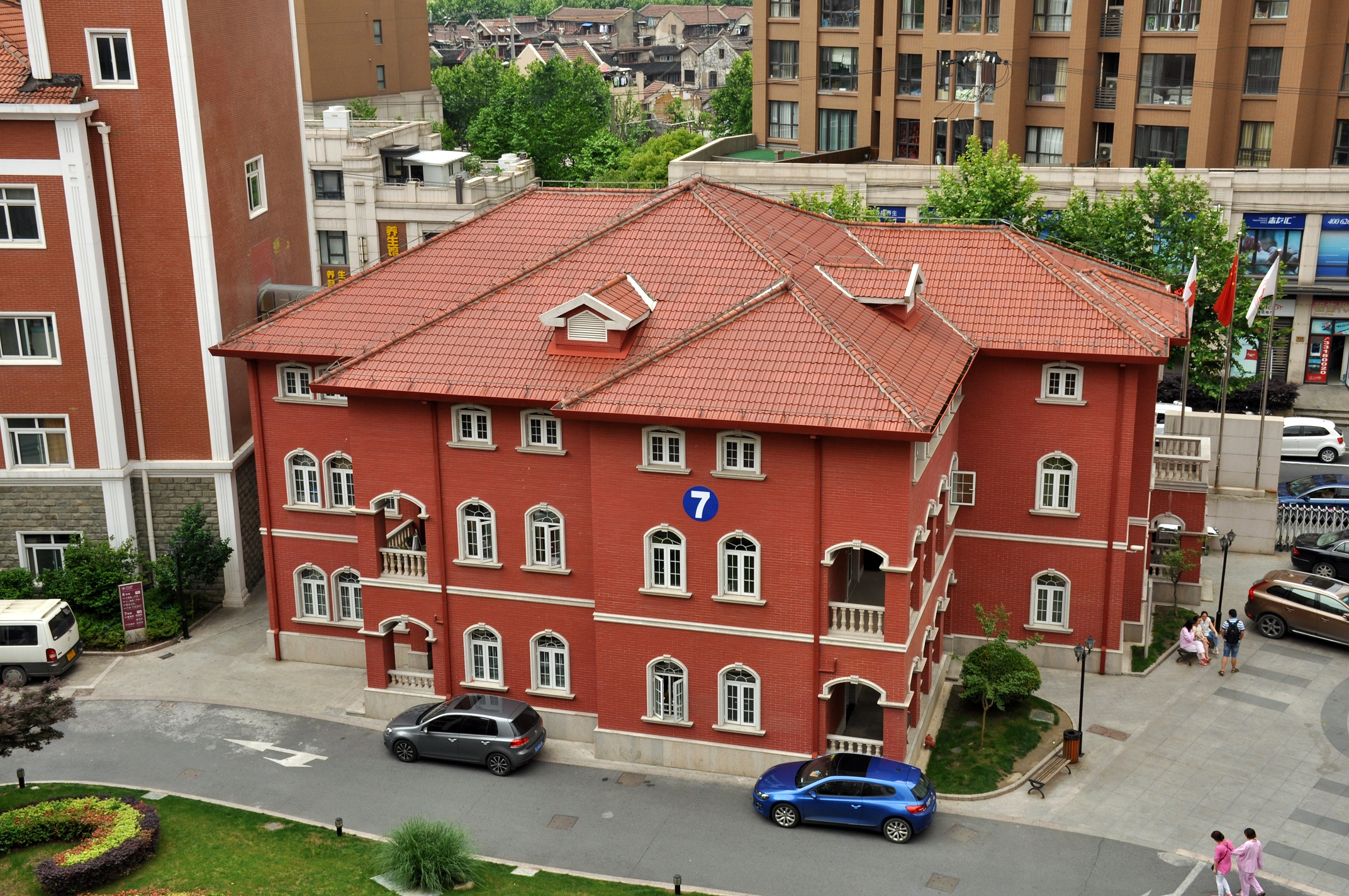
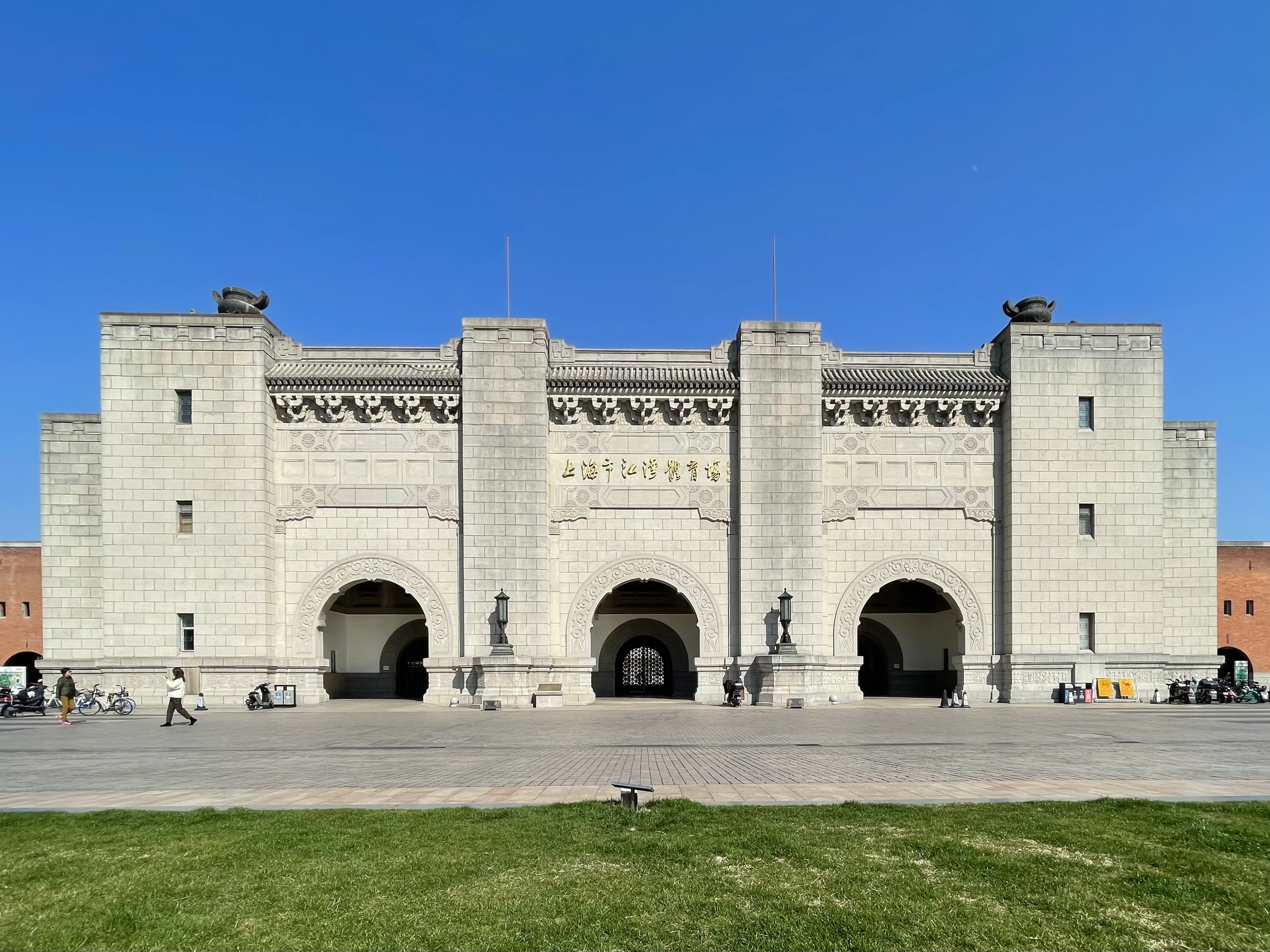
- Wujiaochang Fudan University Yangpu Bridge Yangshupu Waterworks Red House Hospital Jiangwan Stadium

- Location within Shanghai
- Coordinates: 31°15′35″N 121°31′33″EYangpu government
- Country: People's Republic of China
- Municipality: Shanghai

Government
  - District Governor: Jin Xinming (CCP)

Area
  - Total: 60.61 km^{2} (23.40 sq mi)

Population (2020)
  - Total: 1,242,548
  - Density: 20,500/km^{2} (53,100/sq mi)
- Time zone: UTC+8 (China Standard Time)
- Website: www.shyp.gov.cn

Chinese names

Yangpu District
- Traditional Chinese: 楊浦區
- Simplified Chinese: 杨浦区
- Wugniu: yan^{2} phu^{3} chiu^{1}
- Literal meaning: Poplar Bank District
Transcriptions
Standard Mandarin
- Hanyu Pinyin: Yángpǔ Qū
Wu
- Wugniu: yan^{2} phu^{3} chiu^{1}
- IPA: Shanghainese: [ɦiã˩ pʰu˦ tɕʰy˩]
Yue: Cantonese
- Jyutping: joeng^{4} pou^{2} keoi^{1}

Yangshupu
- Traditional Chinese: 楊樹浦
- Simplified Chinese: 杨树浦
- Postal: Yangtzepoo; Yangtszepoo
- Literal meaning: Poplar Tree Bank
Transcriptions
Standard Mandarin
- Hanyu Pinyin: Yángshùpǔ
- Wade–Giles: Yang-shu-pʻu

Yangpu is one of the 16 districts of Shanghai. It is located in the northeastern part of downtown Shanghai, bordering the Huangpu River on the east and south, Hongkou on the west, and Baoshan on the north. The southern part of Yangpu District is 4 km (2.5 mi) away from The Bund, a major tourist attraction. It is predominantly composed of residential communities, with a total area of 60.61 km^{2} (23.40 sq mi) and a population of 1,242,548 as of 2020. The district administers 12 subdistricts.

== Name ==
The name Yangshupu, formerly romanized as Yangtzepoo or Yangtszepoo, is Chinese for "poplar bank" and refers to the creek (simplified Chinese: 杨树浦|河; traditional Chinese: 楊樹浦河; pinyin: Yángshùpǔ Hé) running through the area beside present-day Lanzhou Rd (formerly Lay Road) from the Qiu River in the north to the Huangpu River in the south. Yangshupu District was established in 1945, but the Shanghai Municipal Government contracted the name to Yangpu in 1950.

== History ==
As with most of modern Shanghai, the territory of Yangpu has been formed by sediments deposited by the Yangtze River over many centuries. It was probably in the shallows of the East China Sea as late as the Tang dynasty. During the Northern Song, the Wuyu River (simplified Chinese: 吴淤江; traditional Chinese: 吳淤江; pinyin: Wúyū Jiāng) entered the sea somewhere around modern Wujiaochang (simplified Chinese: 五角场; traditional Chinese: 五角場; pinyin: Wǔjiǎochǎng). Daoist and Buddhist temples are known to have been established in the vicinity around this time. In 1404, the Huangpu River shifted to its present course, entering the Yangtze River around Wusong. Toward the end of the Ming dynasty, villages along the river flourished, engaging in agriculture, banking, textiles and water-borne trade.

In 1842, the Treaty of Nanking opened Shanghai as a treaty port, and in 1863, part of present-day Yangpu District was included in the Shanghai Concession. Yangpu is one of the oldest industrial areas in central Shanghai, with a history of industrial development spanning more than 150 years.Beginning in the 1880s, the area of contemporary Yangpu District began industrializing, with the Shanghai Machinery and Papermaking Office (Chinese: 上海机器造纸局; pinyin: Shànghǎi Jīqì Zàozhǐ Jú) opening in 1882, and the Yangshupu Waterworks opening in 1883. In 1890, the Shanghai Machine Weaving Office (Chinese: 上海机器织布局; pinyin: Shànghǎi Jīqì Zhībù Jú), one of China's first modern textile weaving factories, was established. In 1899, 10.89 km^{2} (4.20 sq mi) of what is now the south of modern Yangpu District was partitioned to become part of the International Settlement. Additional factories were constructed soon after in the area, especially along Yangshupu Road. Textile, paper-making, and shipbuilding industries were established by the early 20th century in what was then organized as part of Hongkew (now Hongkou). By the early 1920s, journalist turned revolutionary Chen Duxiu remarked in the New Youth magazine that the area of Yangshupu had become industrialized. By 1927, the area hosted 57 foreign factories, and a thriving textile industry. In 1929, the Wujiaochang farmers' market ("Pentagon Plaza") was constructed in the north. Later, during the Japanese occupation from 1937 to 1945, barracks and houses were built in the area. The inland part of the former International Settlement in the area made up part of the Shanghai Ghetto. In December 1944, Yangshupu District was established with an area of 7.7 km^{2} (3.0 sq mi).

Following the Communist conquest of Shanghai in 1949, the area was developed. Yangpu District's boundaries expanded in 1956, 1960, and 1984. The area was especially used for heavy industries. The district's present territory west of the river was formed after the incorporation of Wujiaochang District from Baoshan County in 1984. In 1992, Yangpu's territories south of the Huangpu River were designated part of the Pudong New District.

== Education ==
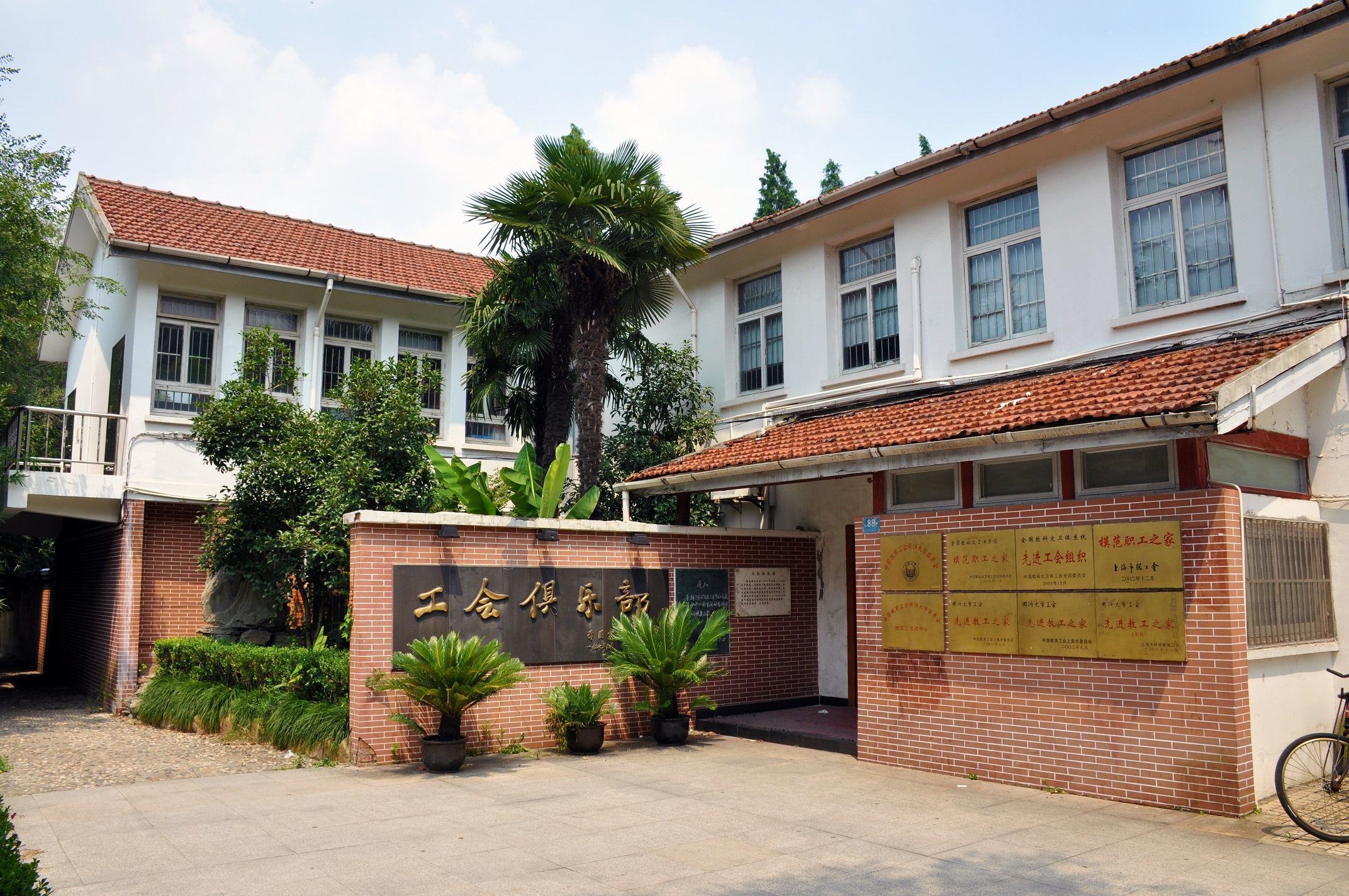
A building belonging to Tongji University

A number of prominent universities are situated in Yangpu District, such as Fudan University, Tongji University, the Shanghai University of Finance and Economics, the Shanghai University of Electric Power, the University of Shanghai for Science and Technology, Second Military Medical University, the Shanghai University of Sport, and Shanghai Ocean University.

Both the Lycée Français de Shanghai and German School Shanghai share a "Eurocampus" in Yangpu District, which opened in 2019.

== Economy ==
Since the beginning of the 21st century, Yangpu District has increasingly developed away from labor-intensive industry towards commerce and high technology: the area around Wujiaochang now boast ten large commercial centers and the research and development zone on Dalian Road hosts the regional headquarters of Siemens and Continental AG.

== Subdistricts ==
As of 2020, Yangpu District administers 12 subdistricts.

Name	Chinese (S)	Hanyu Pinyin	Shanghainese Romanization	Population (2010)	Area (km^{2})
Dinghai Road Subdistrict	定海路街道	Dìnghǎilù Jiēdào	din he lu ka do	100,480	6.25
Pingliang Road Subdistrict	平凉路街道	Píngliánglù Jiēdào	bin lian lu ka do	85,870	3.41
Jiangpu Road Subdistrict	江浦路街道	Jiāngpǔlù Jiēdào	kaon phu lu ka do	95,382	2.39
Siping Road Subdistrict	四平路街道	Sìpínglù Jiēdào	sy bin lu ka do	92,505	2.64
Kongjiang Road Subdistrict	控江路街道	Kòngjiānglù Jiēdào	khon cian kaon lu ka do	105,613	2.15
Changbai Xincun Subdistrict	长白新村街道	Chángbái Xīncūn Jiēdào	tzan baq sin tsen ka do	70,195	3.05
Yanji Xincun Subdistrict	延吉新村街道	Yánjí Xīncūn Jiēdào	yi ciq sin tsen ka do	90,334	2.04
Yinhang Subdistrict	殷行街道	Yīnháng Jiēdào	in raon ka do	192,554	9.52
Daqiao Subdistrict	大桥街道	Dàqiáo Jiēdào	da djio ka do	124,954	4.41
Wujiaochang Subdistrict	五角场街道	Wǔjiǎochǎng Jiēdào	ng koq dzan ka do	149,090	7.66
Xinjiangwancheng Subdistrict	新江湾城街道	Xīnjiāngwānchéng Jiēdào	sin kaon ue zen ka do	27,251	8.68
Changhai Road Subdistrict	长海路街道	Zhǎnghǎilù Jiēdào		178,994	8.77

== Transportation ==
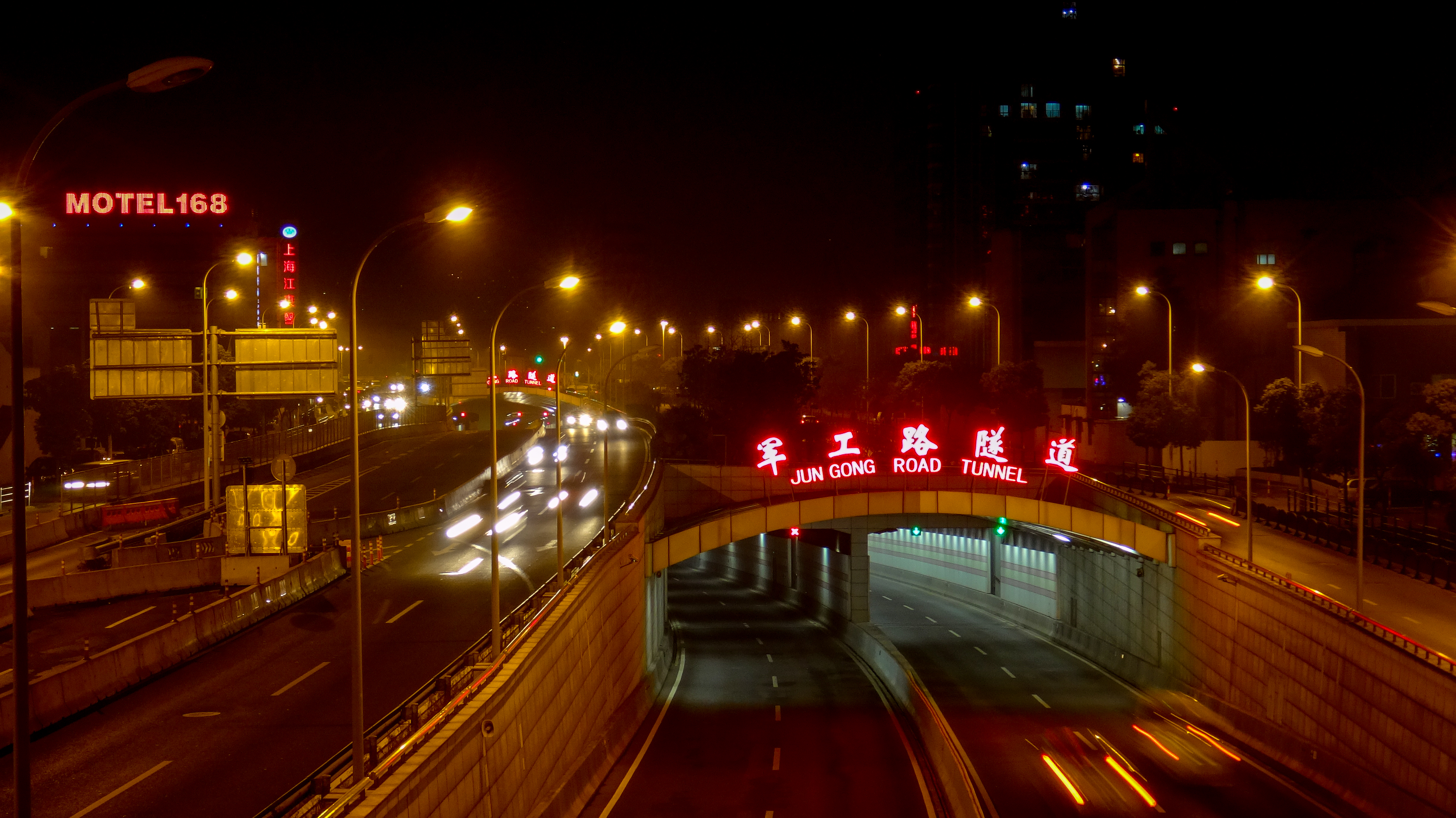
Jungong Road Tunnel

Yangpu District is connected to the neighbouring Pudong New Area across the Huangpu River by one bridge, three tunnels, and six ferry lines. These include the Yangpu Bridge, the Xiangyin Road Tunnel, the Dalian Road Tunnel, and the Jungong Road Tunnel. A fourth tunnel, the Yinhang Road Tunnel is currently under construction.

The Inner Ring Road and Middle Ring Road traverse through Yangpu District.

The industrial wharves along the Huangpu River which service the industrial centres of Yangpu are being phased out by residential developments on the waterfront. Yangpu District has 15.5 kilometers of bank along Huangpu River, which is the longest among all districts in Puxi. As of July 2019, 5.5 kilometers of jogging and cycling lane has been built along the bank.

=== Metro ===
Yangpu is currently served by five metro lines operated by Shanghai Metro: Line 4, Line 8, Line 10, Line 12 and Line 18.

- Line 4 - Dalian Road 12 , Yangshupu Road
- Line 8 - Shiguang Road, Nenjiang Road, Xiangyin Road, Huangxing Park, Middle Yanji Road, Huangxing Road, Jiangpu Road 18 , Anshan Xincun, Siping Road 10
- Line 10 - Siping Road 8 Tongji University, Guoquan Road 18 , Wujiaochang, Jiangwan Stadium, Sanmen Road, East Yingao Road, Xinjiangwancheng, Guofan Road
- Line 12 - Dalian Road 4 , Jiangpu Park 18 , Ningguo Road, Longchang Road, Aiguo Road, Fuxing Island
- Line 18 - Danyang Road, Pingliang Road, Jiangpu Park 12 , Jiangpu Road 8 , Fushun Road, Guoquan Road 10 , Fudan University, Zhengli Road

== Sports ==
Jiangwan Stadium is located in Yangpu District along with its associated athletic complex.

== Parks and recreation ==
Yangpu District is home to Gongqing Forest Park.

The Fudan University Museum (Chinese: 复旦大学博物馆; pinyin: Fùdàn Dàxué Bówùguǎn), a public display of historical artefacts in possession of Fudan University, is located on the university's campus in Yangpu District.

== See also ==
- Districts of Shanghai
