= Pingliang Road station =

Shanghai Metro station

Pingliang Road 平凉路
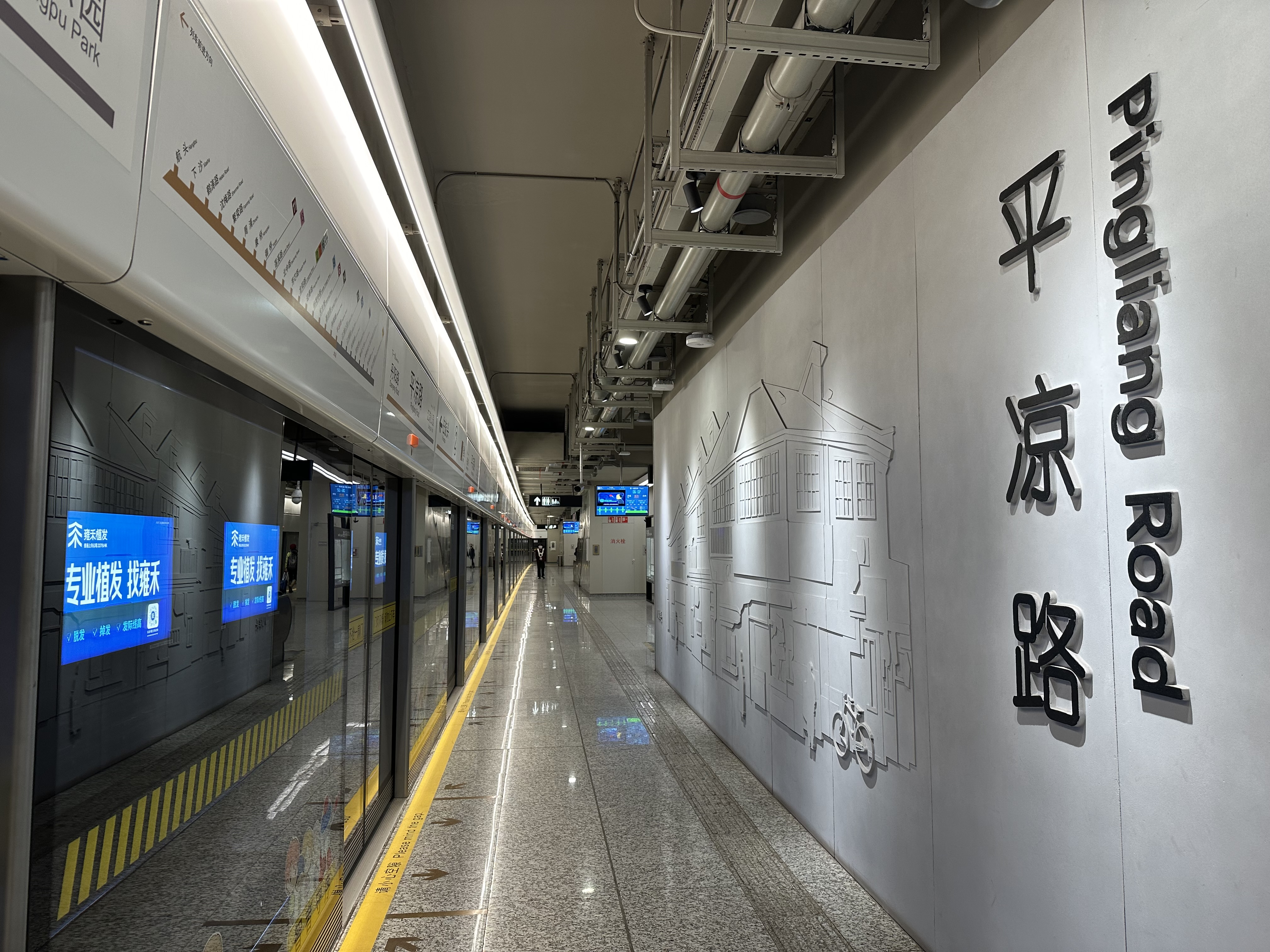
- Station platform

General information
- Location: Pingliang Road and Jiangpu Road; Yangpu District, Shanghai; China
- Coordinates: 31.260727°N 121.522424°E
- Line: Line 18
- Platforms: 3 (1 island platform and 1 side platform)
- Tracks: 3

Construction
- Structure type: Underground
- Accessible: Yes

History
- Opened: 30 December 2021

Services
Preceding station	Shanghai Metro	Following station
Jiangpu Park towards Kangwen Road	Line 18	Danyang Road towards Hangtou
Location

Pingliang Road (Chinese: 平凉路; pinyin: Píngliáng Lù) is a Shanghai Metro station on Line 18 within Yangpu District, Shanghai. Located at the intersection of Pingliang Road and Jiangpu Road, the station opened on December 30, 2021, at the northern segment of Line 18 between South Changjiang Road and Yuqiao stations, which includes Pingliang Road station.

== Places nearby ==
It is located near the administrative buildings of Yangpu District.
