= Jiangpu Park station =

Shanghai Metro station

Jiangpu Park 江浦公园
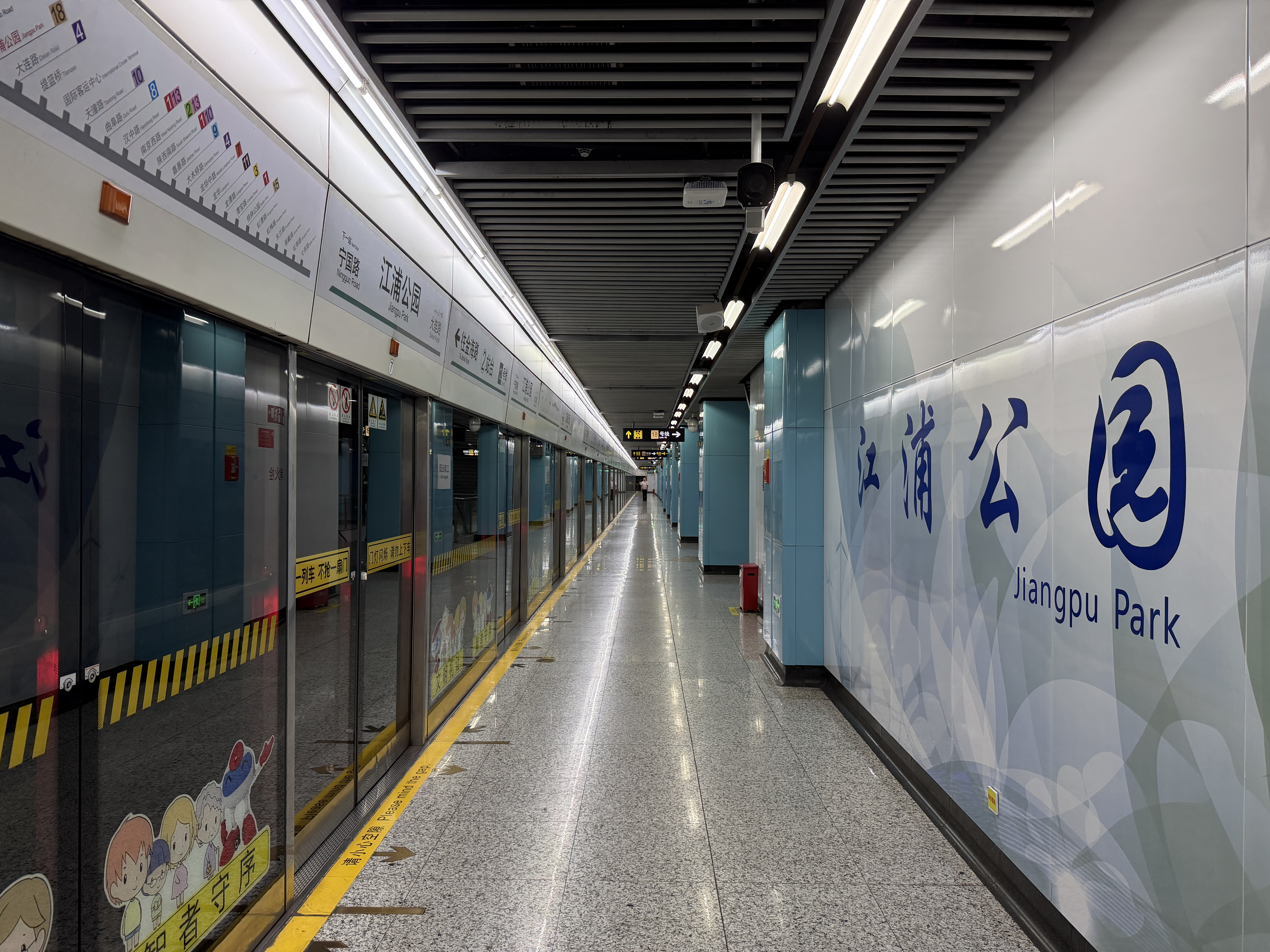
- Line 12 platform

General information
- Location: Changyang Road and Jiangpu Road (江浦路); Yangpu District, Shanghai; China
- Coordinates: 31.26664°N 121.51933°E
- Lines: Line 12; Line 18
- Platforms: 4 (2 island platforms)
- Tracks: 4

Construction
- Structure type: Underground
- Accessible: Yes

History
- Opened: 29 December 2013 (Line 12); 30 December 2021 (Line 18)

Services
Preceding station	Shanghai Metro	Following station
Dalian Road towards Qixin Road	Line 12	Ningguo Road towards Jinhai Road
Jiangpu Road towards Kangwen Road	Line 18	Pingliang Road towards Hangtou
Location

Jiangpu Park (simplified Chinese: 江浦公园; traditional Chinese: 江浦公園; pinyin: Jiāngpǔ Gōngyuán) is an interchange station. The station began operations when Line 12 opened on 29 December 2013, followed by Line 18 on 30 December 2021.

== Station layout ==
G	Entrances and Exits	Exits 1-5
B1	Concourse	Faregates, Station Agent
B2	Westbound	← Line 12 towards Qixin Road (Dalian Road)
B2	Island platform, doors open on the left
B2	Eastbound	Line 12 towards Jinhai Road (Ningguo Road) →
B3	Northbound	← Line 18 towards South Changjiang Road (Jiangpu Road)
B3	Island platform, doors open on the left
B3	Southbound	Line 18 towards Hangtou (Pingliang Road) →
