= Yangshupu Power Plant =

Coordinates: 31.2712°N 121.5559°E

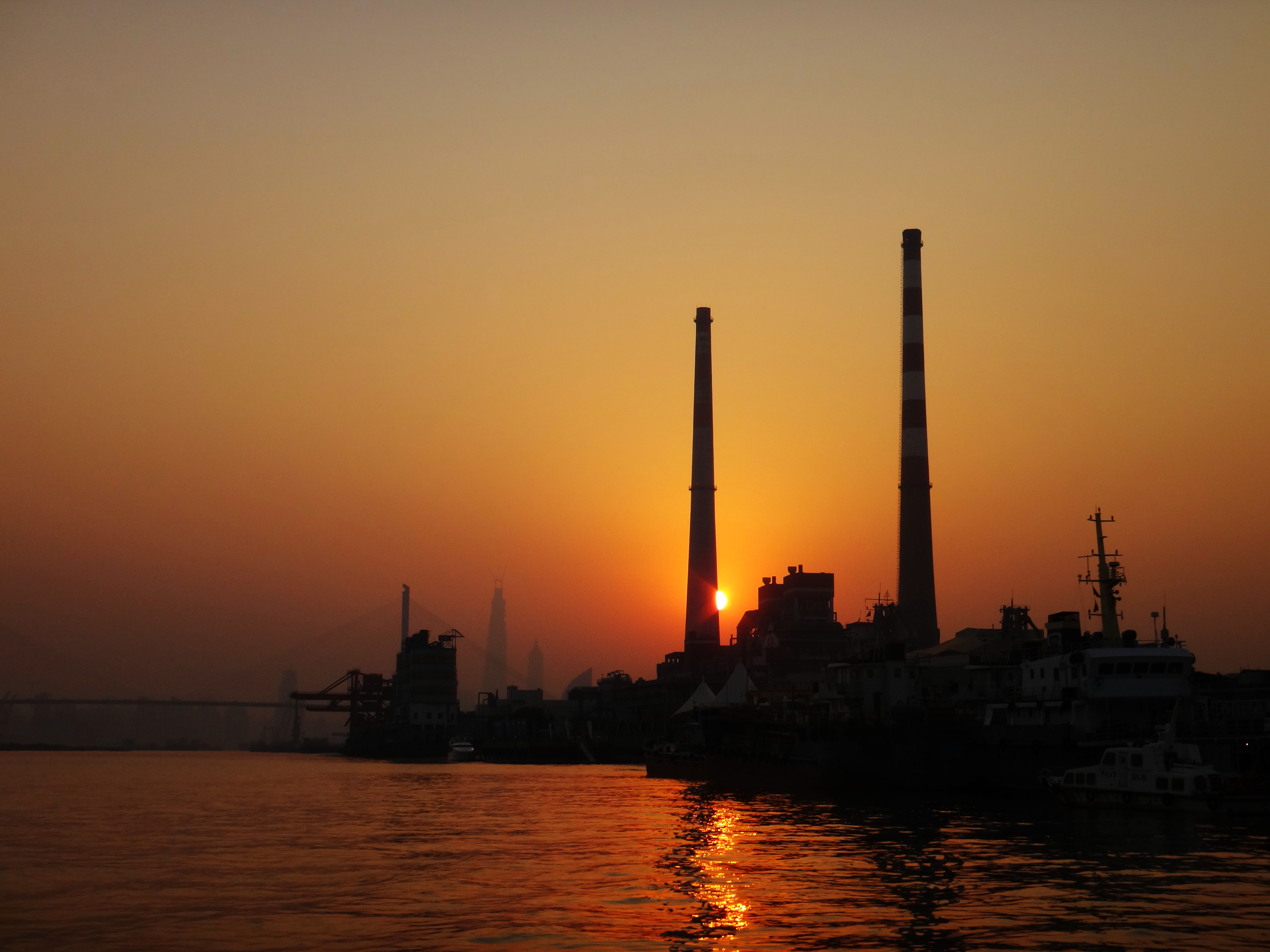
Yangshupu Power Plant at sunset

The Yangshupu Power Plant (Chinese: 杨树浦发电厂; pinyin: yángshùpǔ Fādiànchǎng) was a coal-fired power station in Shanghai, China. The power station was commissioned in 1911 by a British businessman. It was the Far East's first power plant.

The city closed some generation machines of the Yangshupu Power Plant in 2008 and closed this power plant officially in 2010. Because Shanghai plans to reduce its overall COD discharge from about 302,000 tons in 2006 to 259,000 tons in 2010.

== See also ==
- List of power stations in China
