= Tiantong Road station =

Shanghai Metro interchange station

Tiantong Road 天潼路
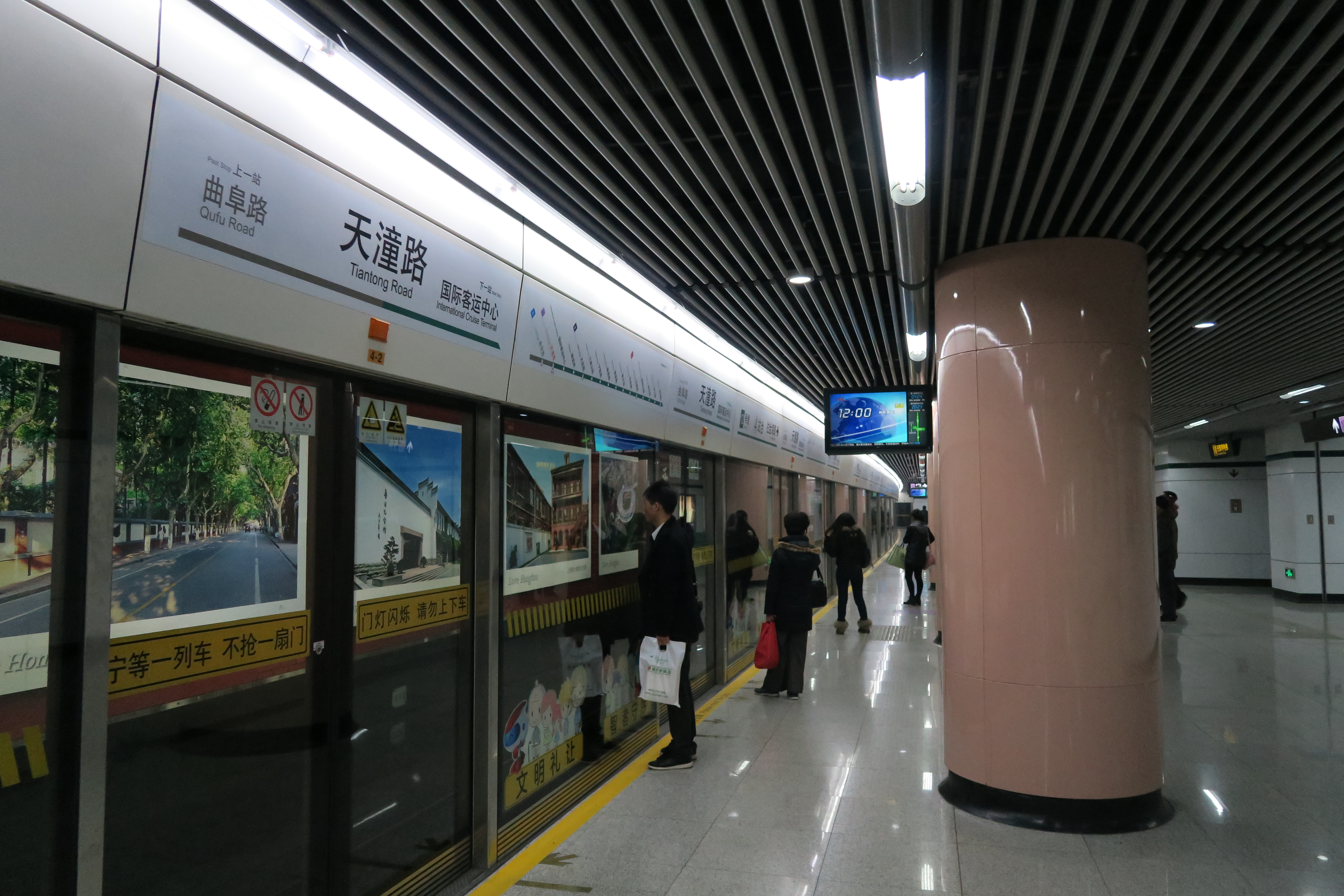
- Line 12 platform

General information
- Location: North Henan Road and Tiantong Road (天潼路); Hongkou District, Shanghai; China
- Coordinates: 31°14′43″N 121°28′38″E
- Operated by: Shanghai No. 1/4 Metro Operation Co. Ltd.
- Lines: Line 10; Line 12
- Platforms: 4 (1 island platform for Line 10 and 2 side platforms for Line 12)
- Tracks: 4

Construction
- Structure type: Underground
- Accessible: Yes

Other information
- Station code: L10/17 (Line 10)

History
- Opened: 10 April 2010 (Line 10); 29 December 2013 (Line 12)

Services
Preceding station	Shanghai Metro	Following station
East Nanjing Road towards Hongqiao Railway Station or Hangzhong Road	Line 10	North Sichuan Road towards Jilong Road
Qufu Road towards Qixin Road	Line 12	International Cruise Terminal towards Jinhai Road
Location

Tiantong Road (Chinese: 天潼路; pinyin: Tiāntóng Lù) is an interchange station between Line 10 and Line 12 of the Shanghai Metro. It entered operation on 10 April 2010. Line 12 opened on 29 December 2013, and served as the western terminus of the initial section of the line until 10 May 2014, when it was extended one stop westward to Qufu Road.

== Station Layout ==
G	Entrances and Exits	Exits 1-6
B1	Concourse	Faregates, Station Agent
B2	Westbound	← Line 10 towards Hongqiao Railway Station or Hangzhong Road (East Nanjing Road)
B2	Island platform, doors open on the left
B2	Eastbound	Line 10 towards Jilong Road (North Sichuan Road) →
B3	Side platform, doors open on the right
B3	Westbound	← Line 12 towards Qixin Road (Qufu Road)
B3	Eastbound	Line 12 towards Jinhai Road (International Cruise Terminal) →
B3	Side platform, doors open on the right
