= Jiangpu Road station =

Shanghai Metro station

Jiangpu Road 江浦路
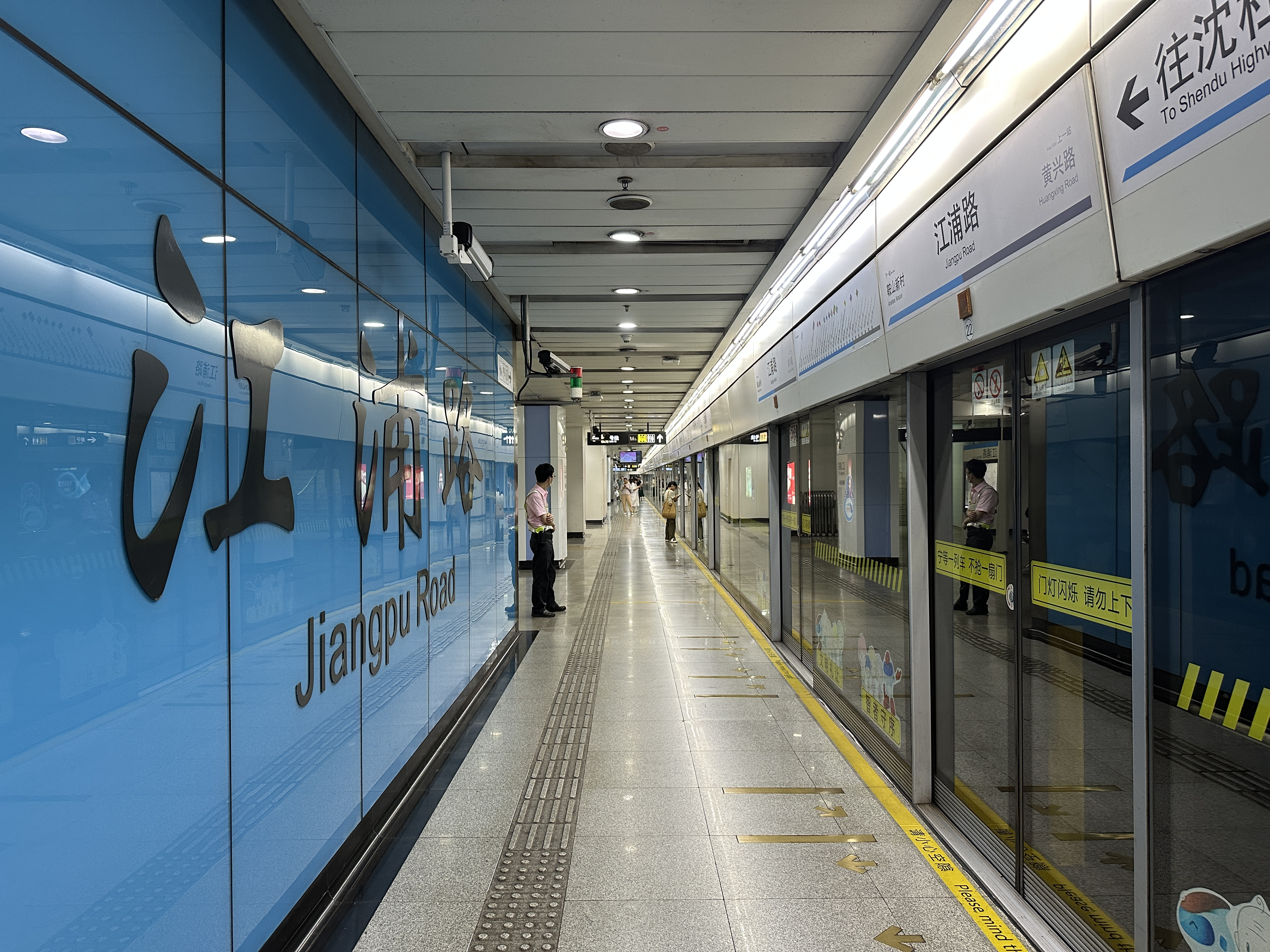
- Line 8 platform

General information
- Location: Shanghai; China
- Coordinates: 31.2772°N 121.512°E
- Operated by: Shanghai No. 4 Metro Operation Co. Ltd.
- Lines: Line 8; Line 18
- Platforms: 4 (2 island platforms)
- Tracks: 4

Construction
- Structure type: Underground
- Accessible: Yes

History
- Opened: 29 December 2007 (Line 8); 30 December 2021 (Line 18)

Services
Preceding station	Shanghai Metro	Following station
Huangxing Road towards Shiguang Road	Line 8	Anshan Xincun towards Shendu Highway
Fushun Road towards Kangwen Road	Line 18	Jiangpu Park towards Hangtou
Location

Jiangpu Road (Chinese: 江浦路; pinyin: Jiāngpǔ Lù) is the name of an interchange station on Shanghai Metro lines 8 and 18. It began operation on 29 December 2007. It later became an interchange station after the opening of Line 18 on 30 December 2021.

== Station Layout ==
G	Entrances and Exits	Exits 1–6
B1	Concourse	Faregates, Station Agent
B2	Northbound	← Line 18 towards South Changjiang Road (Fushun Road)
B2	Island platform, doors open on the left
B2	Southbound	Line 18 towards Hangtou (Jiangpu Park) →
B3	Northbound	← Line 8 towards Shiguang Road (Huangxing Road)
B3	Island platform, doors open on the left
B3	Southbound	Line 8 towards Shendu Highway (Anshan Xincun) →

== Places Nearby ==
- Xinhua Hospital (Exit 2)
