= Xiangyin Road station =

Shanghai Metro station

Xiangyin Road 翔殷路
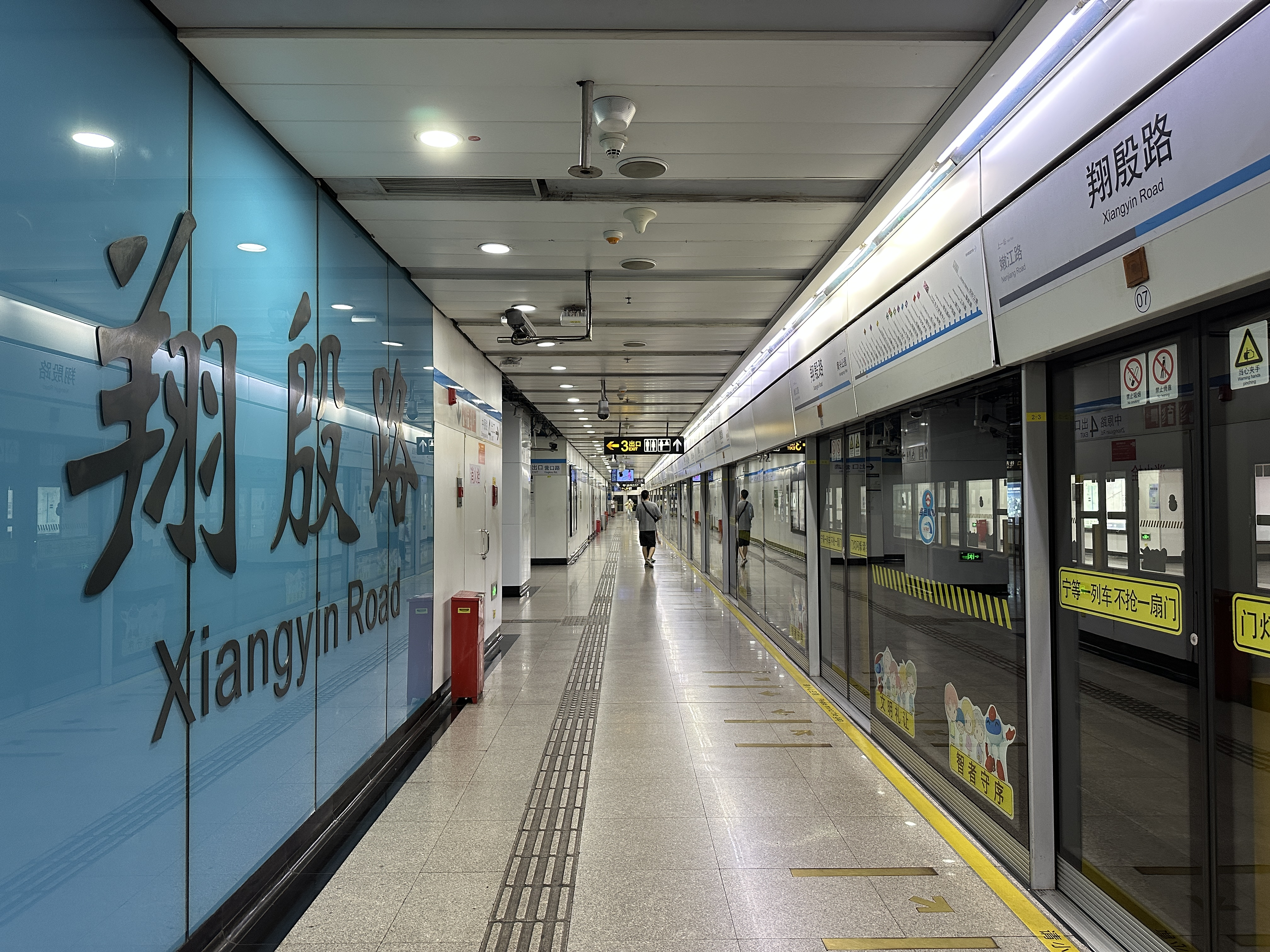
- Station platform

General information
- Location: Yingkou Road and Xiangyin Road, Yangpu District, Shanghai; China
- Coordinates: 31.3075°N 121.527°E
- Operated by: Shanghai No. 4 Metro Operation Co. Ltd.
- Line: Line 8
- Platforms: 2 (2 side platforms)
- Tracks: 2

Construction
- Structure type: Underground
- Accessible: Yes

History
- Opened: December 29, 2007

Services
Preceding station	Shanghai Metro	Following station
Nenjiang Road towards Shiguang Road	Line 8	Huangxing Park towards Shendu Highway
Location

Xiangyin Road (Chinese: 翔殷路; pinyin: Xiángyīn Lù) is a station on Shanghai Metro Line 8. It began operation on December 29, 2007. It is located at Yingkou Road and Xiangyin Road.

A significant thoroughfare in Shanghai, China's busy metropolis, is Xiangyin Road. Notable for its historical relevance, architectural wonders, and lively ambiance, Xiangyin Road is an essential thoroughfare that links several Shanghai districts.

== History ==
Xiangyin Road, which was first built in the early 20th century, has experienced major changes over time, reflecting Shanghai's own development. When the city experienced a surge in urbanization in the late 20th century, the road—which had previously been a quiet street lined with traditional Chinese homes—saw tremendous development.

== Culture significance ==
Xiangyin Road is culturally significant as a center of activity and community life in addition to its architectural wonders. The road is lined with a diverse array of restaurants, retail establishments, and entertainment spaces that serve both locals and tourists. Shanghai's urban landscape is made even more vibrant by its lively street life and busy markets.

== Economics ==
Given its cultural significance and the variety of eateries, shops, and entertainment venues it offers, Xiangyin Road in Shanghai probably has a strong local economy. Both residents and visitors who frequent the area spend money on entertainment, dining, and shopping, which increases the local economy.

A strong sense of entrepreneurship and local commerce may be fostered by the road's support of local businesses and livelihoods, given its significance as a hub of community life. Shanghai is a significant economic center in China, so general economic trends in the nation and the city may also have an impact on the thriving economy of neighborhoods like Xiangyin Road.
