= Huangxing Road station =

Shanghai Metro station

Huangxing Road 黄兴路
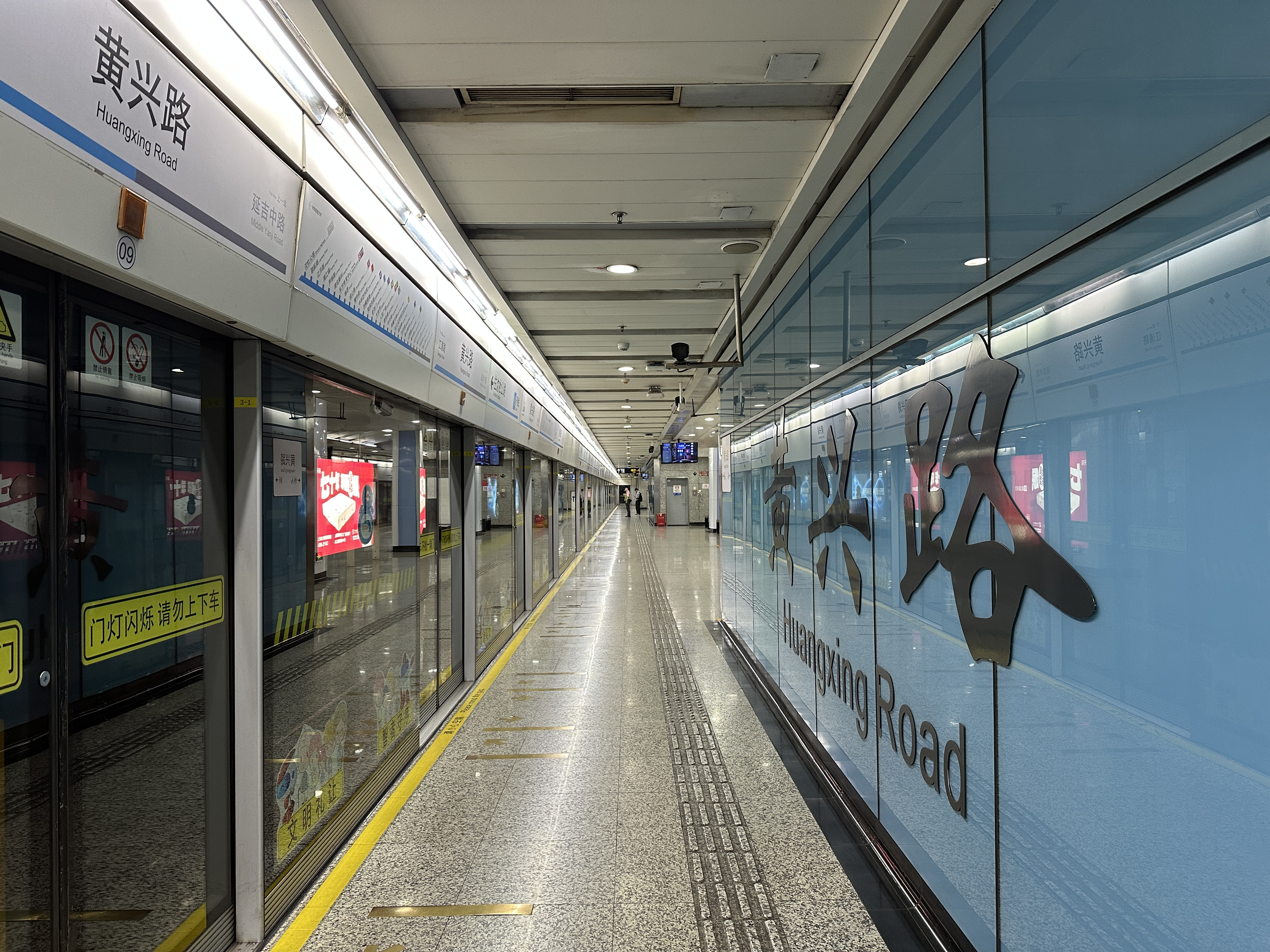
- Station platform

General information
- Location: South Jingyu Road and Kongjiang Road, Yangpu District, Shanghai; China
- Coordinates: 31.2811°N 121.524°E
- Operated by: Shanghai No. 4 Metro Operation Co. Ltd.
- Line: Line 8
- Platforms: 2 (1 island platform)
- Tracks: 2

Construction
- Structure type: Underground
- Accessible: Yes

History
- Opened: December 29, 2007

Services
Preceding station	Shanghai Metro	Following station
Middle Yanji Road towards Shiguang Road	Line 8	Jiangpu Road towards Shendu Highway
Location

Huangxing Road (Chinese: 黄兴路; pinyin: Huángxīng Lù) is a station on Shanghai Metro Line 8. It began operation on December 29, 2007.
