= Middle Yanji Road station =

Shanghai Metro station

Middle Yanji Road 延吉中路
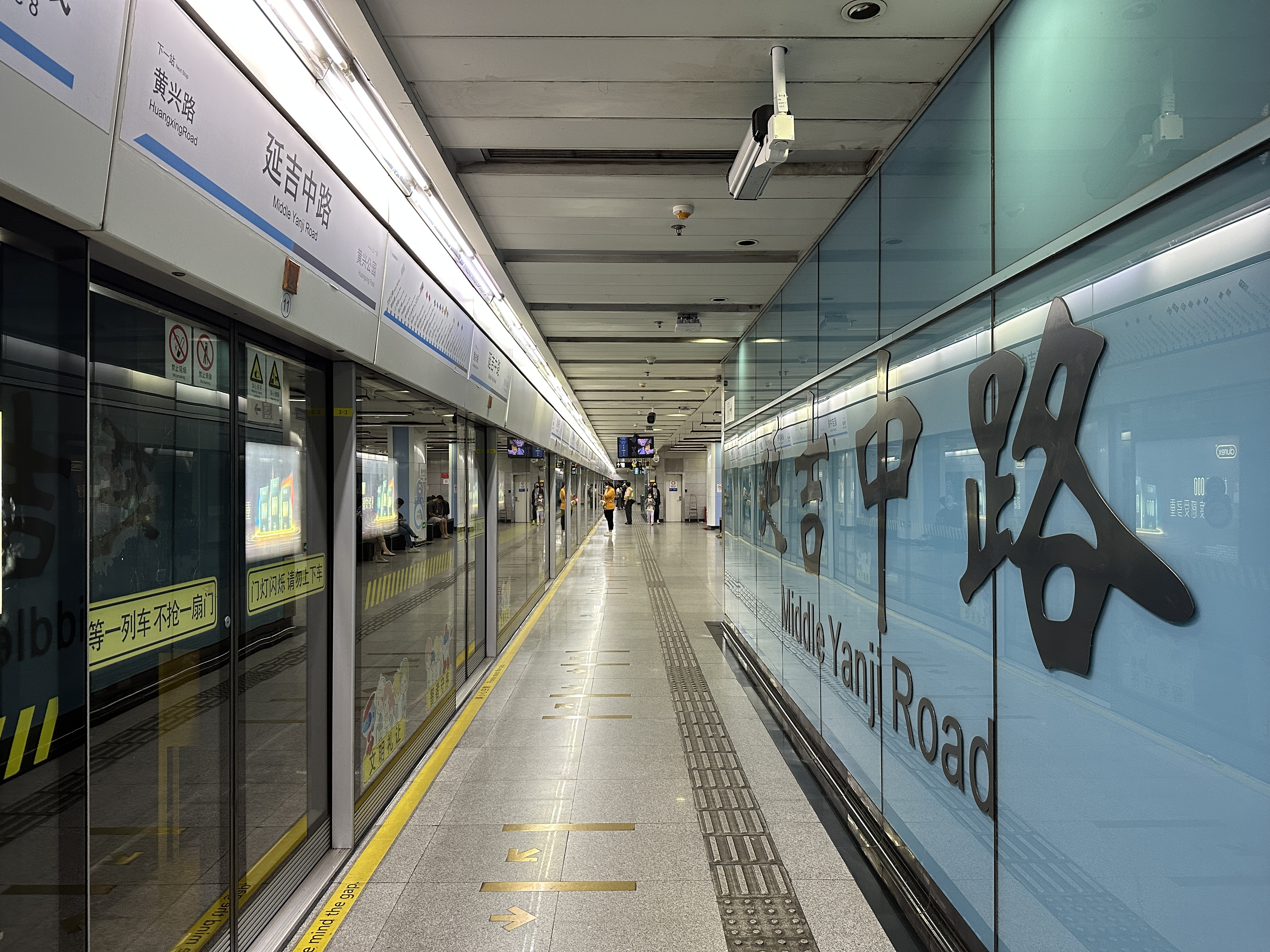
- Station platform

General information
- Location: Middle Jingyu Road and Yingkou Road, Yangpu District, Shanghai; China
- Coordinates: 31.2897°N 121.531°E
- Operated by: Shanghai No. 4 Metro Operation Co. Ltd.
- Line: Line 8
- Platforms: 2 (1 island platform)
- Tracks: 2

Construction
- Structure type: Underground
- Accessible: Yes

History
- Opened: December 29, 2007

Services
| Preceding station | Shanghai Metro | Following station |
|---|---|---|
| Huangxing Park towards Shiguang Road | Line 8 | Huangxing Road towards Shendu Highway |
Location

Middle Yanji Road (Chinese: 延吉中路; pinyin: Yánjí Zhōng Lù) is a station on Shanghai Metro Line 8. It began operation on December 29, 2007.
