= China Art Museum station =

Shanghai Metro station

China Art Museum 中华艺术宫
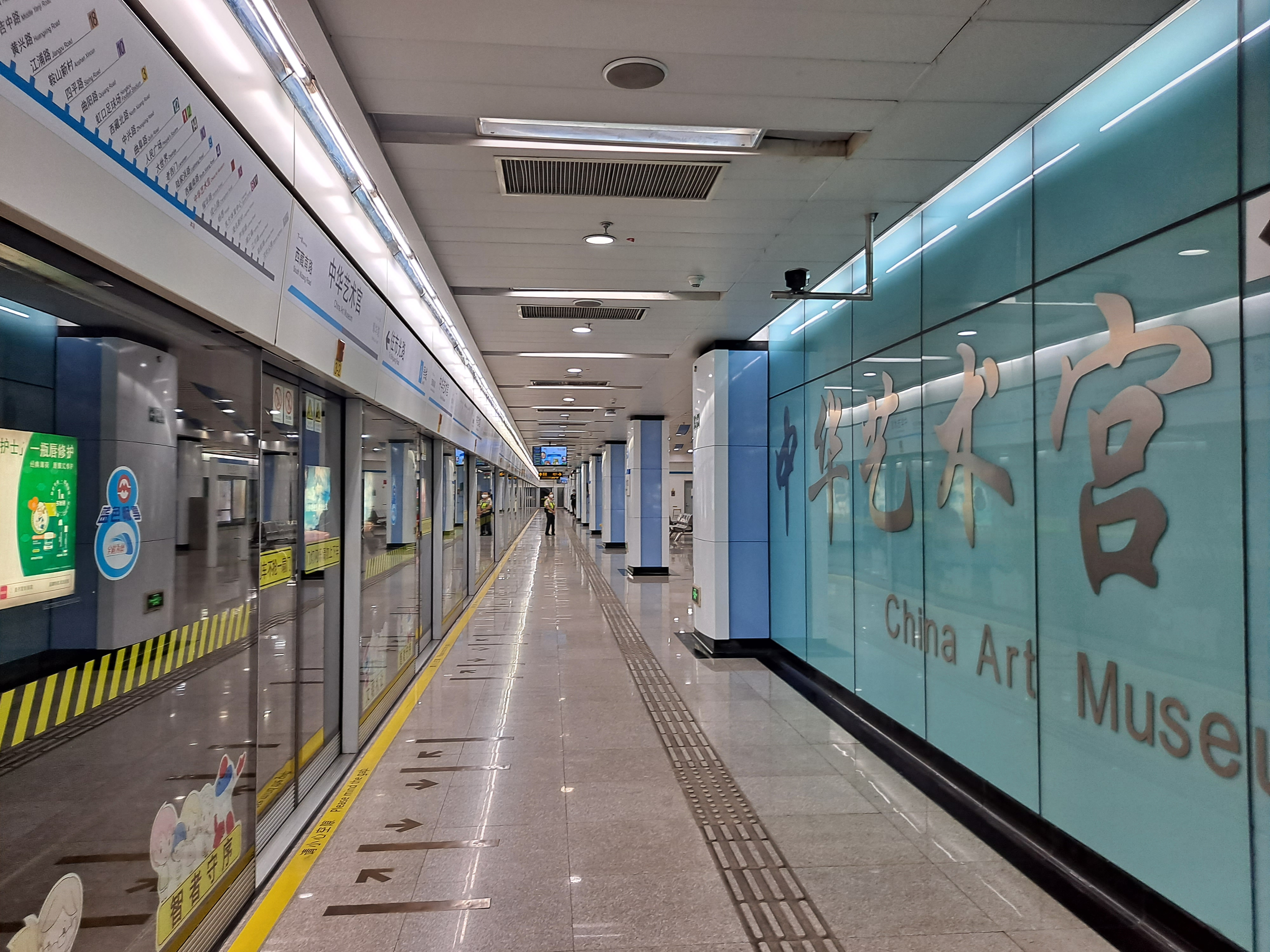
- Station platform

General information
- Location: Bocheng Road (博成路) and Shangnan Road; Pudong, Shanghai; China
- Coordinates: 31°11′11″N 121°29′25″E
- Operated by: Shanghai No. 4 Metro Operation Co. Ltd.
- Line: Line 8
- Platforms: 2 (1 island platform)
- Tracks: 2

Construction
- Structure type: Underground
- Accessible: Yes

History
- Opened: September 28, 2012
- Previous names: Zhoujiadu (before opening)

Services
Preceding station	Shanghai Metro	Following station
South Xizang Road towards Shiguang Road	Line 8	Yaohua Road towards Shendu Highway
Location

China Art Museum (中华艺术宫), formerly Zhoujiadu (周家渡); is a station on Line 8 of the Shanghai Metro. The station opened on September 28, 2012. It is the first station in Pudong when travelling southbound on Line 8.

== Around the station ==
- China Art Museum
- The River Mall
- Mercedes-Benz Arena
