= Anshan Xincun station =

Shanghai Metro station

Coordinates: 31.2753°N 121.504°E

Anshan Xincun 鞍山新村
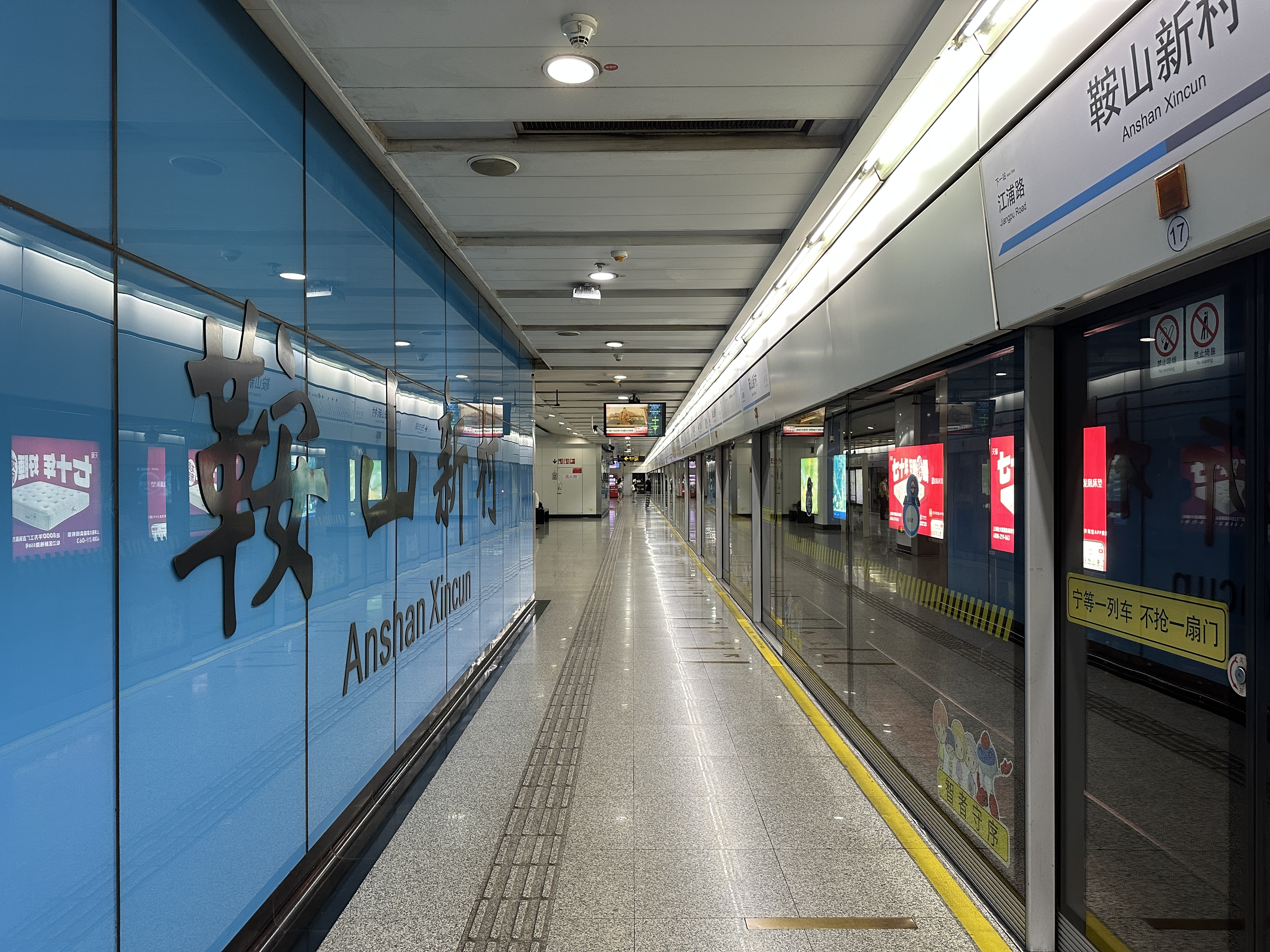
- Station platform

General information
- Location: Kongjiang Road and Dahushan Road (打虎山路); Yangpu District, Shanghai; China
- Operated by: Shanghai No. 4 Metro Operation Co. Ltd.
- Line: Line 8
- Platforms: 2 (1 island platform)
- Tracks: 2

Construction
- Structure type: Underground
- Accessible: Yes

History
- Opened: December 29, 2007

Services
Preceding station	Shanghai Metro	Following station
Jiangpu Road towards Shiguang Road	Line 8	Siping Road towards Shendu Highway
Location

Anshan Xincun (Chinese: 鞍山新村; pinyin: Ānshān Xīncūn) is a station on Shanghai Metro Line 8. It began operation on December 29, 2007.
