= Yangsi station =

Shanghai Metro station

Yangsi 杨思
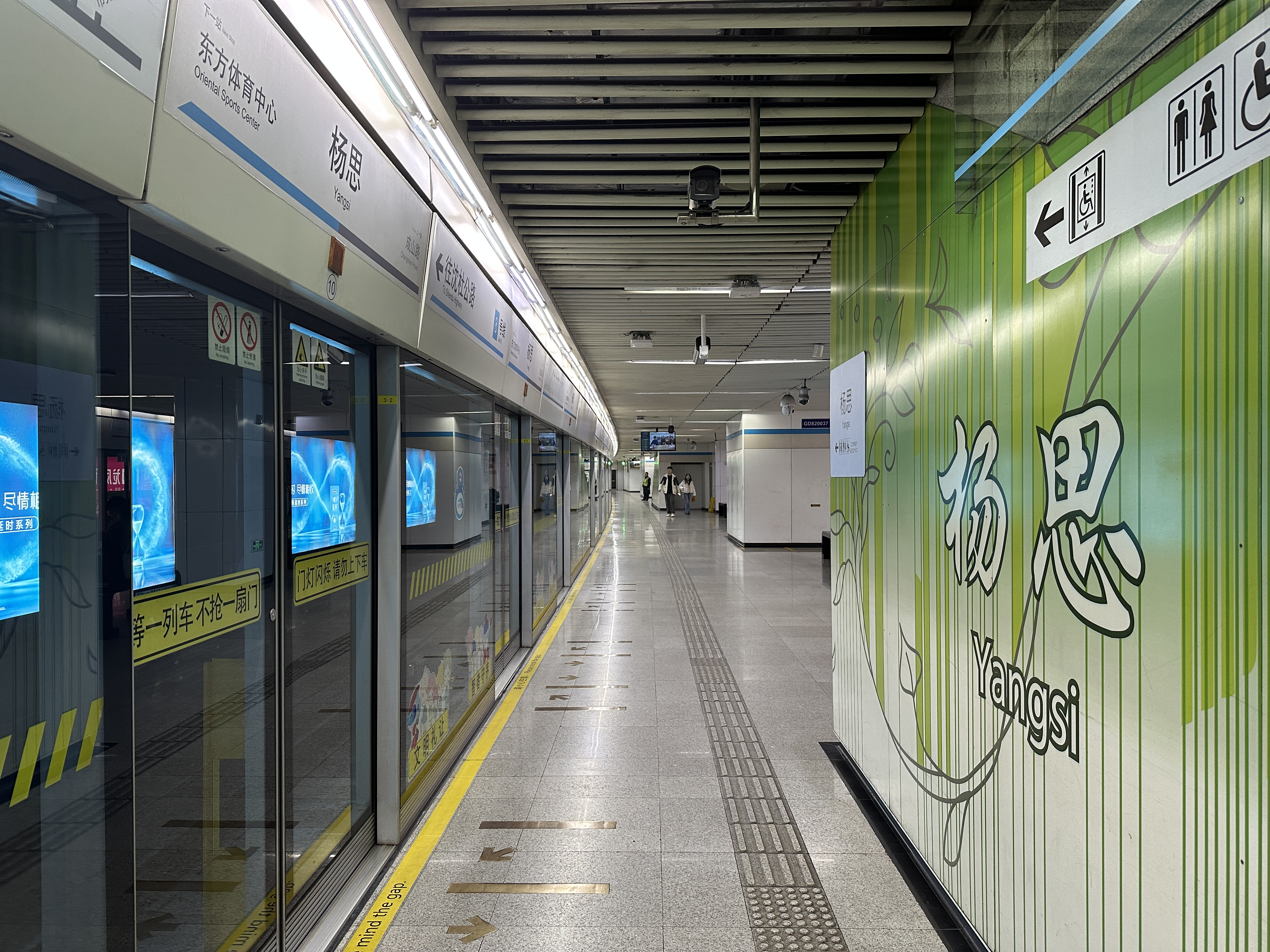
- Station platform

General information
- Location: Shanghai; China
- Coordinates: 31.1628°N 121.489°E
- Operated by: Shanghai No. 4 Metro Operation Co. Ltd.
- Line: Line 8
- Platforms: 2 (1 island platform)
- Tracks: 2

Construction
- Structure type: Underground
- Accessible: Yes

History
- Opened: July 5, 2009

Services
Preceding station	Shanghai Metro	Following station
Chengshan Road towards Shiguang Road	Line 8	Oriental Sports Center towards Shendu Highway
Location

Yangsi (Chinese: 杨思; pinyin: Yángsī) is a station on Line 8 of the Shanghai Metro. This station is part of the southern extension of Line 8 and opened on July 5, 2009.

The name of the station comes from the nearby town, Yangsi.

The station is located in Shanghai's Pudong New Area.
