= Xinhua Hospital Affiliated to the Shanghai Jiao Tong University School of Medicine =

Coordinates: 31°16′27″N 121°30′56″E

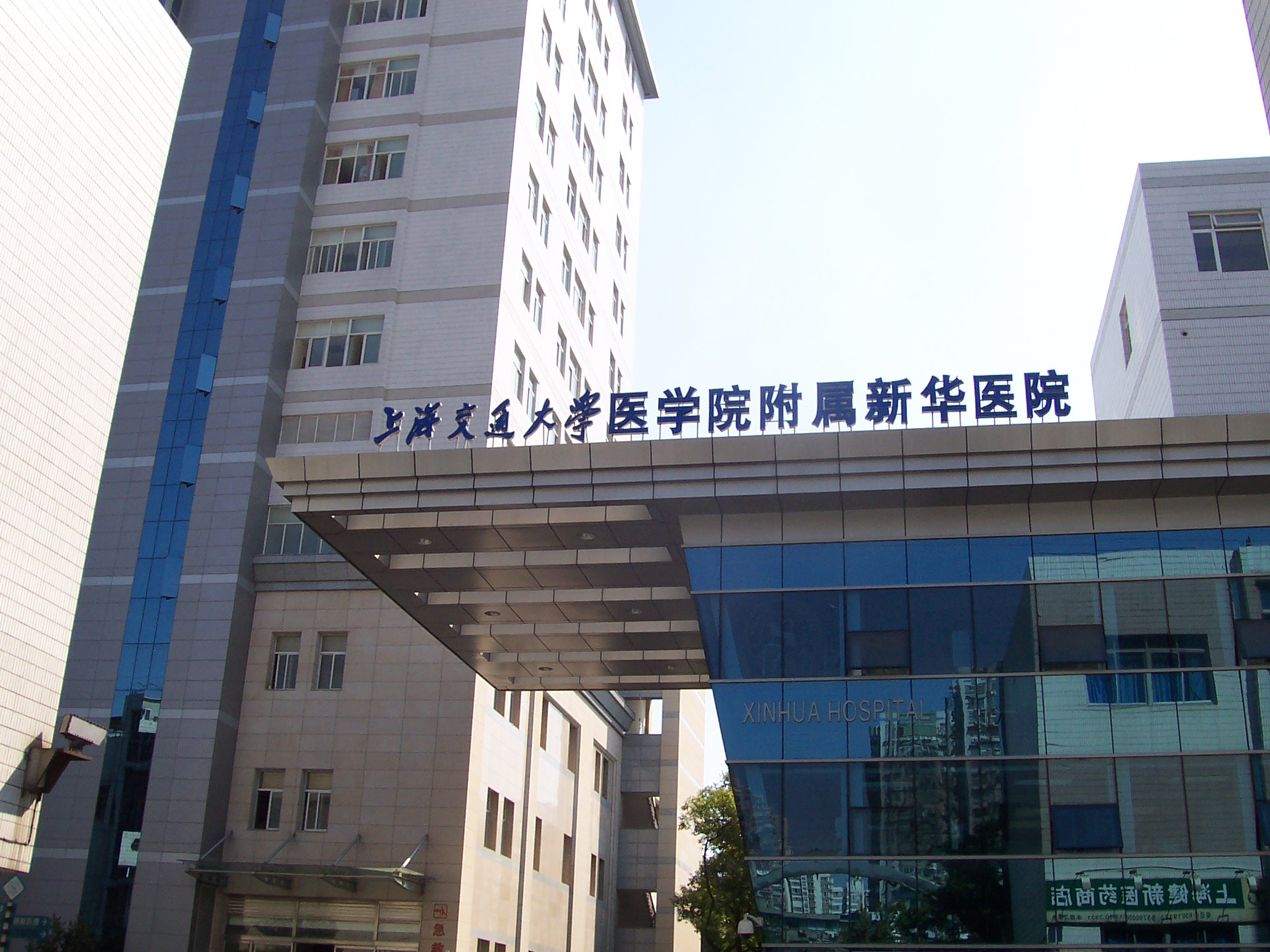

Geography
- Location: Yangpu District, Shanghai, PRC

Organisation
- Care system: Public
- Type: Teaching
- Affiliated university: School of Medicine, Shanghai Jiao Tong University

Services
- Standards: Grade 3, Class A (Chinese: 三级甲等)
- Emergency department: Yes
- Beds: 1586

History
- Founded: 1958; 68 years ago

Links
- Website: http://www.xinhuamed.com.cn
- Other links: Shanghai Second Medical University

Xinhua Hospital Affiliated to the Shanghai Jiao Tong University School of Medicine (上海交通大学医学院附属新华医院) is a public hospital in Shanghai, China

The hospital was established in 1958. It is a university hospital affiliated with School of Medicine, Shanghai Jiao Tong University. Xinhua Hospital is noted for its pediatrics, and is home to the Shanghai Institute for Pediatric Research. It is one of the few hospitals in China able to perform cardiac surgery on newborns, including transposition of great vessels.

In 1998, the hospital helped to establish Shanghai Children's Medical Center with support from Project HOPE (Health Opportunities for People Everywhere).

== Transport ==
- Metro Line 8, Jiangpu Road Station
- Bus: 6, 14, 103, 145, 220, 871, 70, 713, 843, 960
