= Chengshan Road station =

Shanghai Metro station

Chengshan Road 成山路
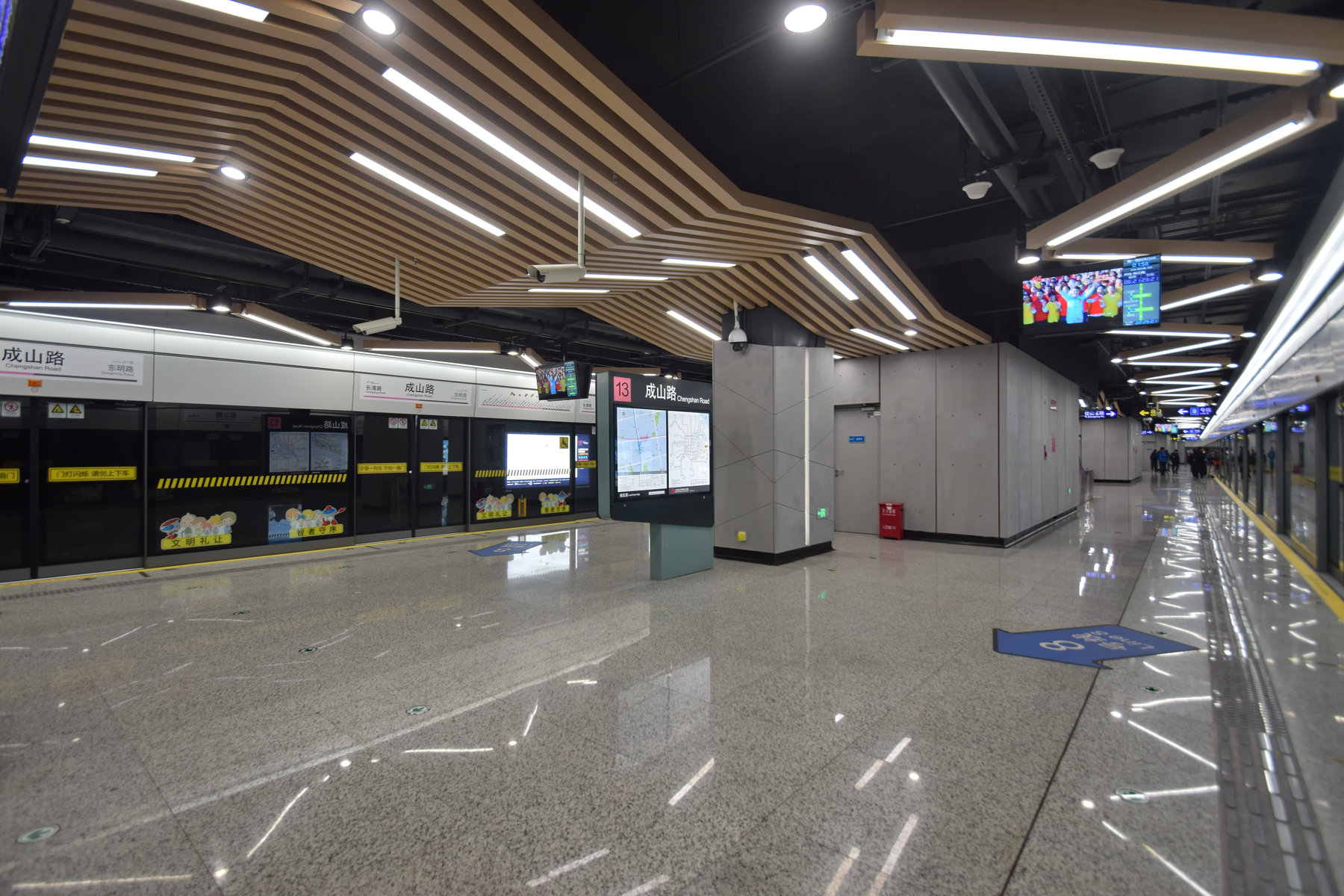
- Line 13 platform

General information
- Location: Shanghai; China
- Coordinates: 31.1722°N 121.491°E
- Operated by: Shanghai No. 2 Metro Operation Co. Ltd. (Line 13); Shanghai No. 4 Metro Operation Co. Ltd. (Line 8)
- Lines: Line 8; Line 13
- Platforms: 4 (2 island platforms)
- Tracks: 4

Construction
- Structure type: Underground
- Accessible: Yes

History
- Opened: 5 July 2009 (Line 8); 30 December 2018 (Line 13)

Services
Preceding station	Shanghai Metro	Following station
Yaohua Road towards Shiguang Road	Line 8	Yangsi towards Shendu Highway
Changqing Road towards Jinyun Road	Line 13	Dongming Road towards Zhangjiang Road
Location

Chengshan Road (Chinese: 成山路; pinyin: Chéngshān Lù) is an interchange station on Lines 8 and 13 of the Shanghai Metro. This station opened as part of the southern extension of Line 8 on 5 July 2009. It became an interchange station with the opening of phases two and three of Line 13 on 30 December 2018. The station is located in Shanghai's Pudong New Area.

== Station Layout ==
G	Entrances and Exits	Exits 1-5
B1	Line 8 Concourse	Faregates, Station Agent
B2	Line 13 Concourse	Faregates, Station Agent
B2	Northbound	← Line 8 towards Shiguang Road (Yaohua Road)
B2	Island platform, doors open on the left
B2	Southbound	Line 8 towards Shendu Highway (Yangsi) →
B3	Westbound	← Line 13 towards Jinyun Road (Changqing Road)
B3	Island platform, doors open on the left
B3	Eastbound	Line 13 towards Zhangjiang Road (Dongming Road) →

== Gallery ==
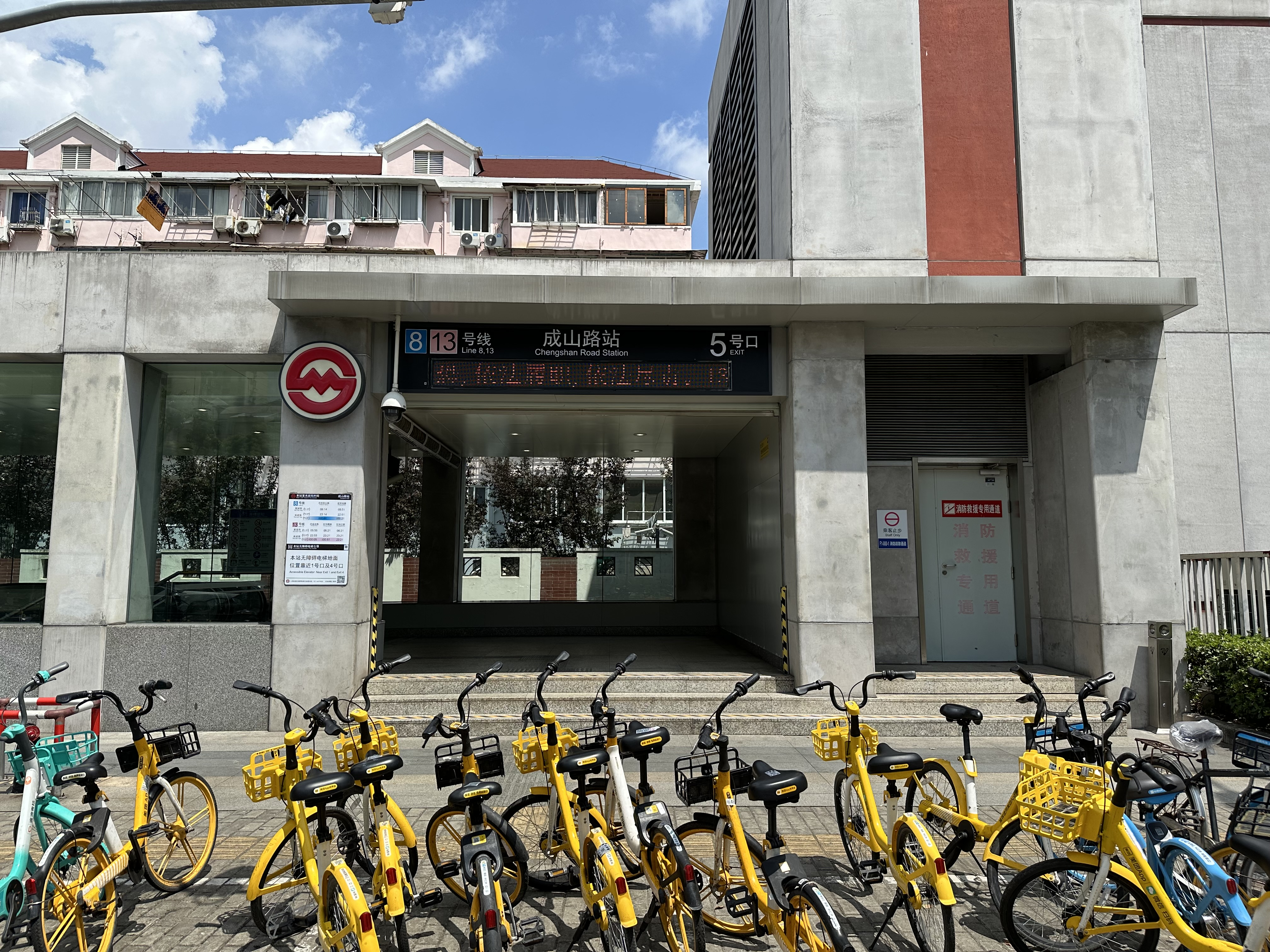
Exit 5

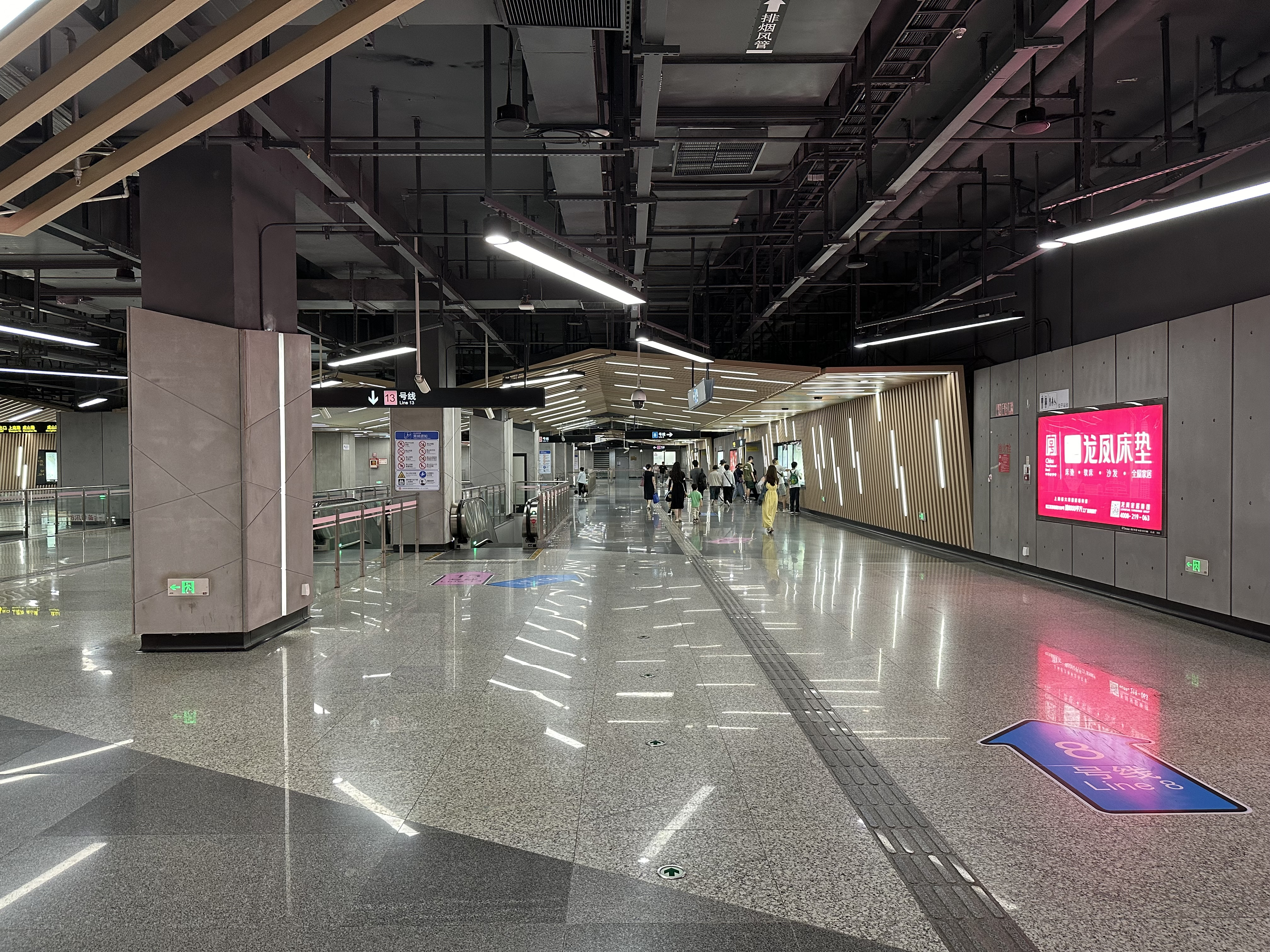
Concourse

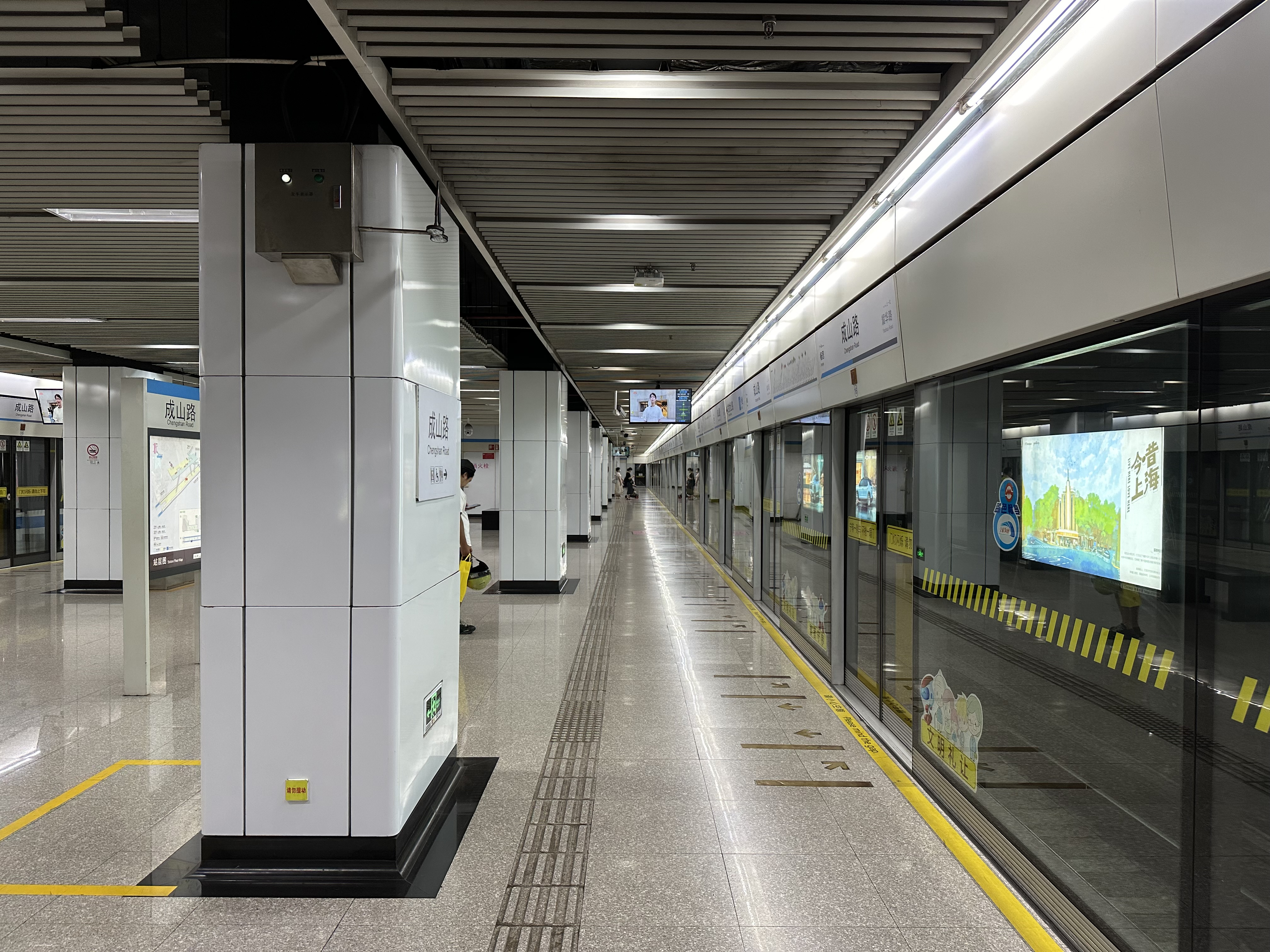
Line 8 platform

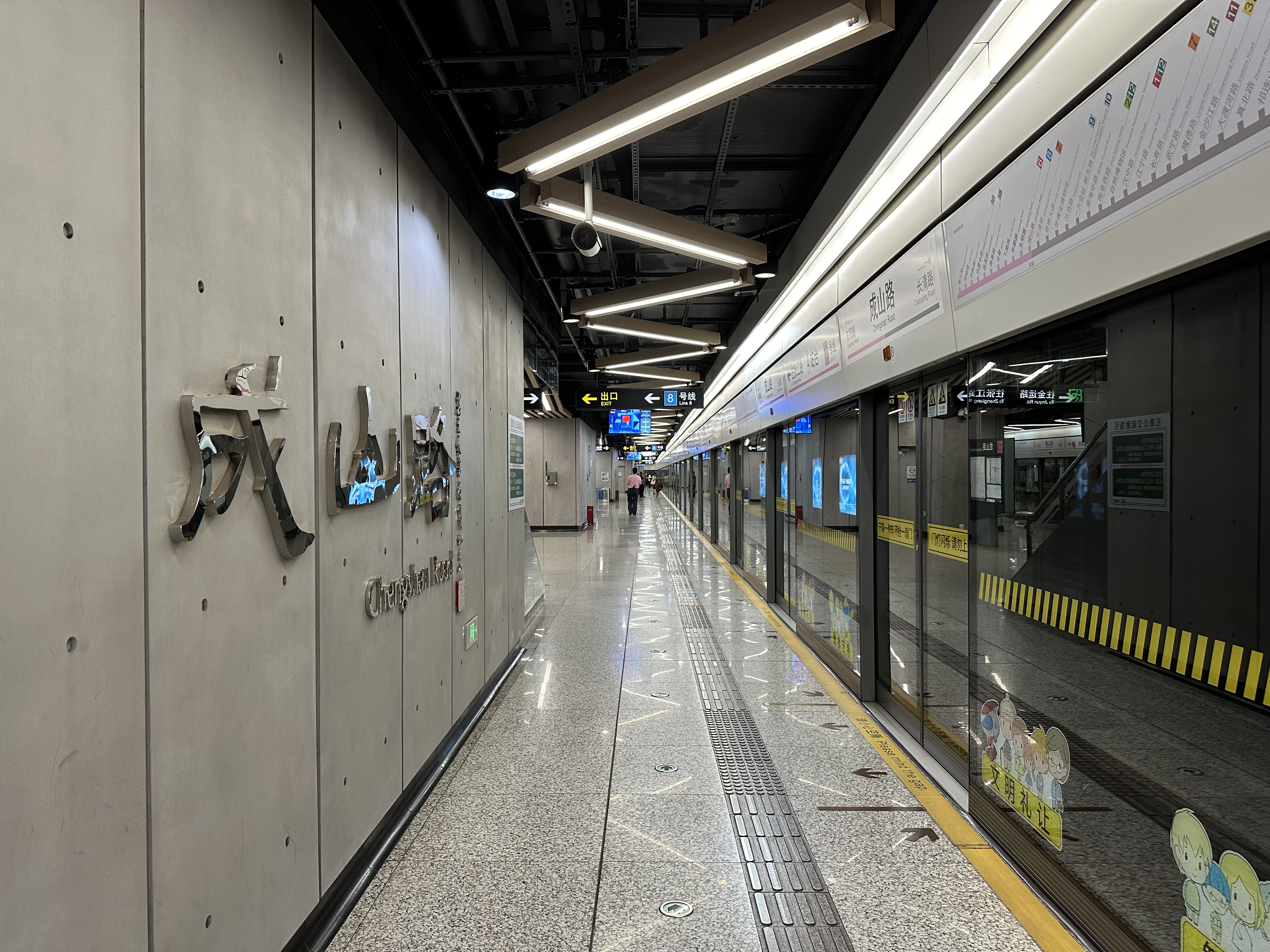
Line 13 platform
