= Huangxing Park station =

Shanghai Metro station

Huangxing Park 黄兴公园
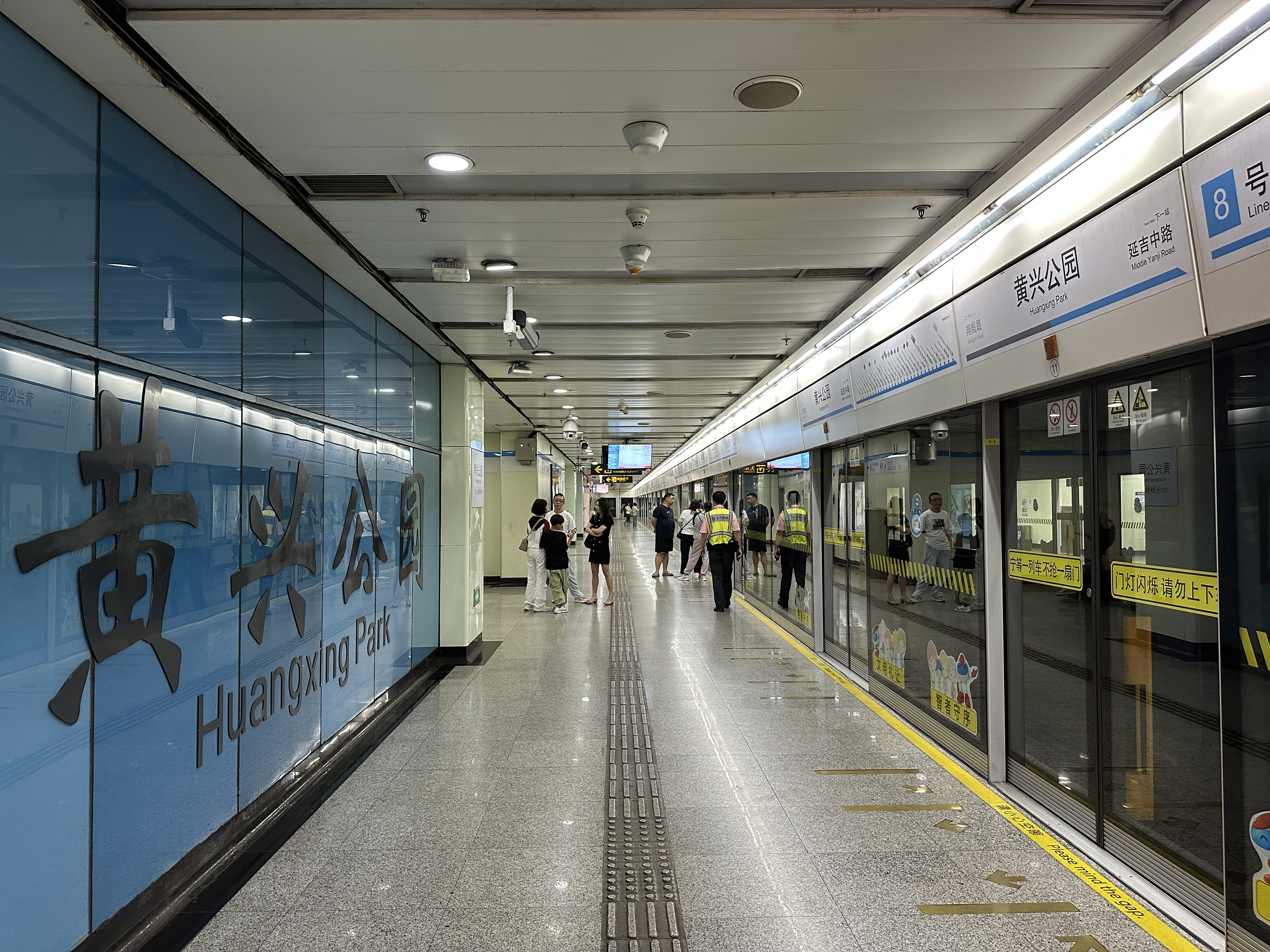
- Station platform

General information
- Location: Yingkou Road south of East Guoshun Road, Yangpu District, Shanghai; China
- Coordinates: 31.2975°N 121.529°E
- Operated by: Shanghai No. 4 Metro Operation Co. Ltd.
- Line: Line 8
- Platforms: 2 (2 side platforms)
- Tracks: 2

Construction
- Structure type: Underground
- Accessible: Yes

History
- Opened: December 29, 2007

Services
| Preceding station | Shanghai Metro | Following station |
|---|---|---|
| Xiangyin Road towards Shiguang Road | Line 8 | Middle Yanji Road towards Shendu Highway |
Location

Huangxing Park (Chinese: 黄兴公园; pinyin: Huángxīng Gōngyuán) is the name of a station on Shanghai Metro Line 8. It began operation on December 29, 2007.
