= Fushun Road station =

Shanghai Metro station

Fushun Road 抚顺路
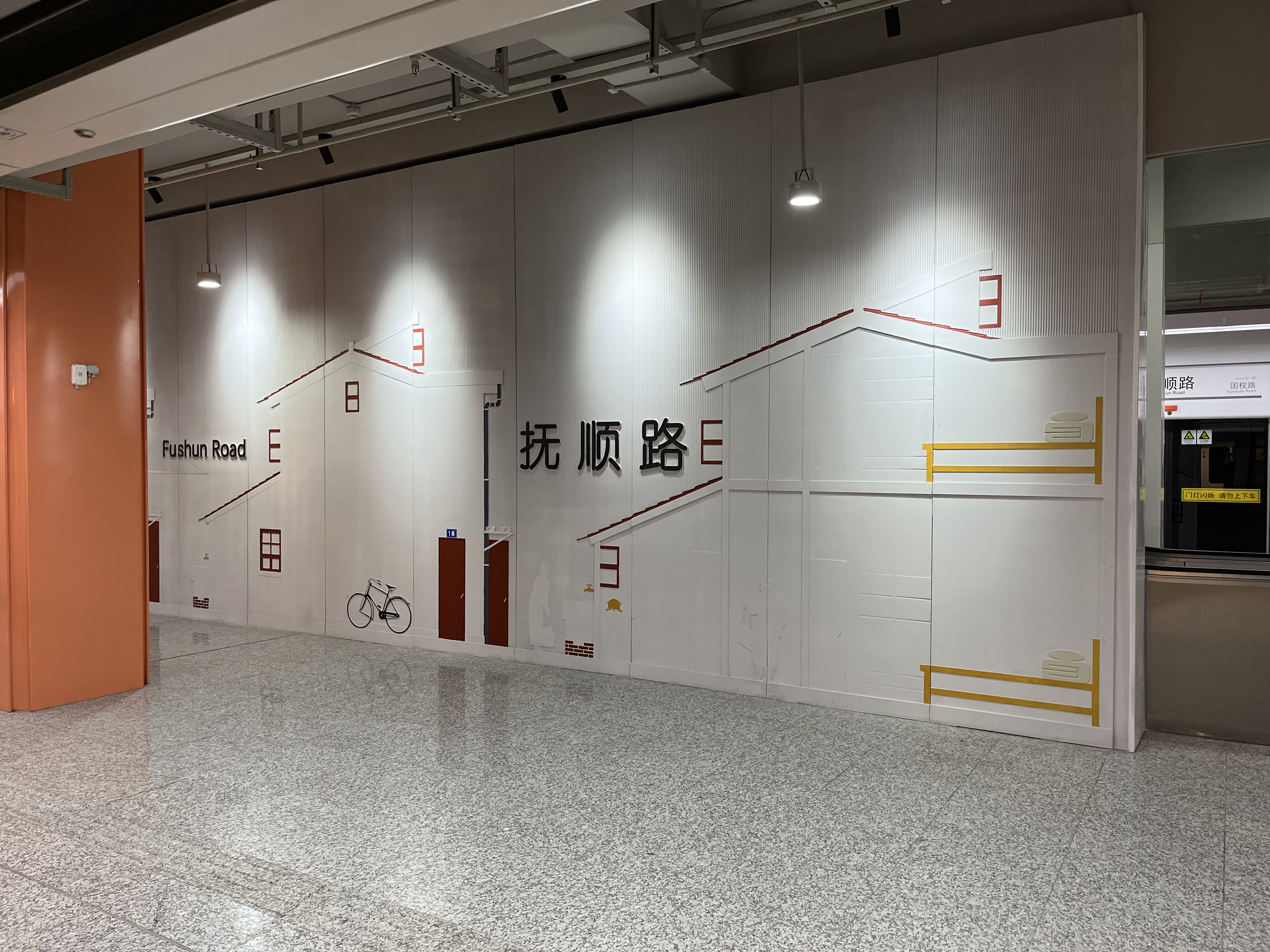

General information
- Location: North No. 2 Zhongshan Road and Jiangpu Road, Yangpu District, Shanghai; China
- Coordinates: 31.285806°N 121.511214°E
- Line: Line 18
- Platforms: 2 (1 island platform)
- Tracks: 2

Construction
- Structure type: Underground
- Accessible: Yes

History
- Opened: 30 December 2021

Services
Preceding station	Shanghai Metro	Following station
Guoquan Road towards Kangwen Road	Line 18	Jiangpu Road towards Hangtou
Location

Fushun Road (Chinese: 抚顺路) is a station on Line 18 of the Shanghai Metro. Located at the intersection of North No. 2 Zhongshan Road and Jiangpu Road in Yangpu District, Shanghai, the station is open with the rest of phase one of Line 18 on 30 December 2021. The station is named after Fushun Road, which intersects Jiangpu Road one block to the south of the station.
