= The River Mall =

Shopping mall in Pudong, Shanghai, China

- 世博源
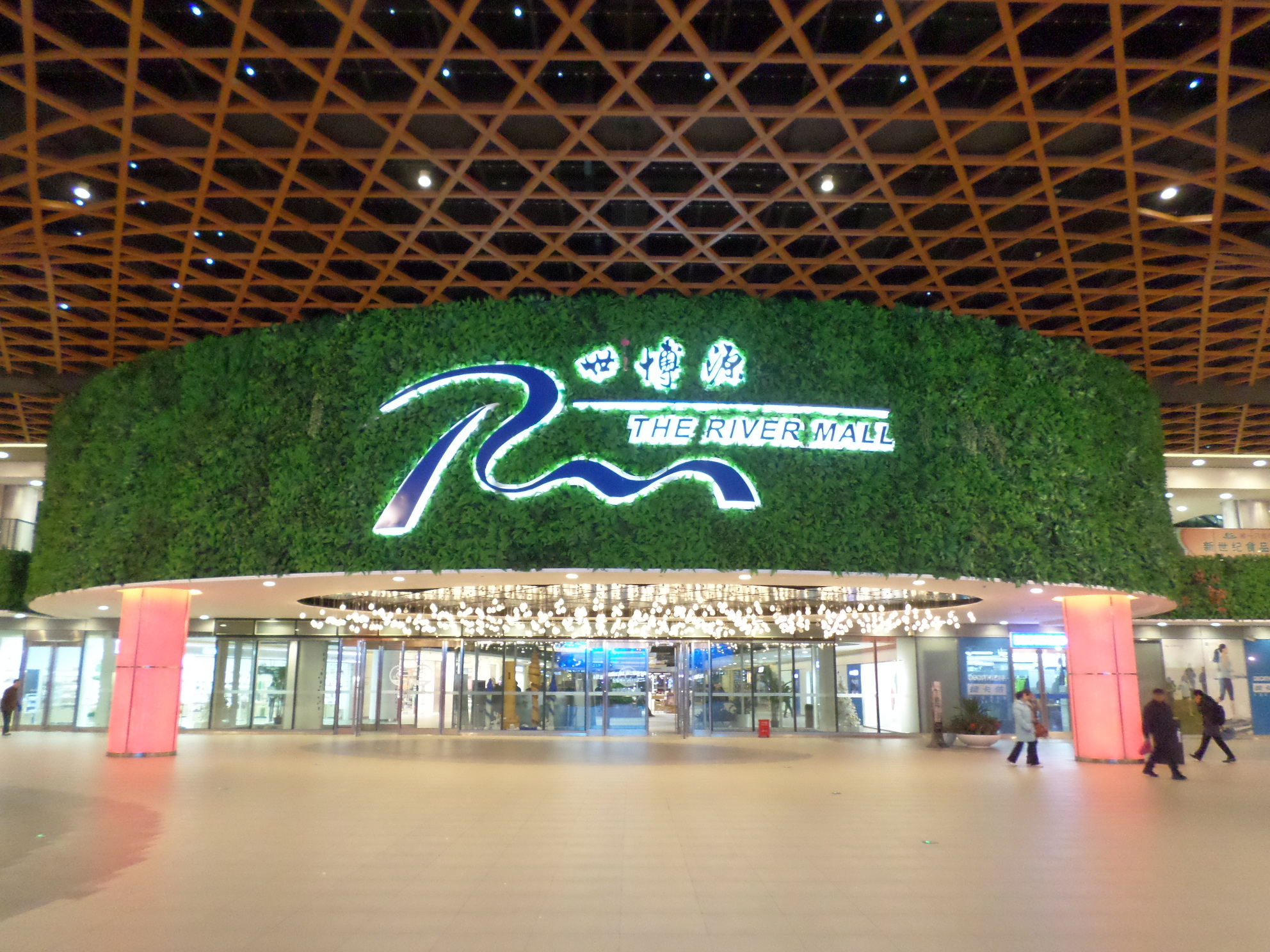
- Location: Pudong, Shanghai, China
- Coordinates: 31°11′00.6″N 121°29′33.2″E
- Website: Official website (in Chinese)

The River Mall (Chinese: 世博源; pinyin: Shìbóyuán) is a shopping center in Pudong, Shanghai, China. The shopping center is located along the Expo Axis at the former area of Expo 2010.

== Architecture ==
The shopping center consists of five floors over five areas.

== Transportation ==
The shopping center is accessible from the Yaohua Road station of the Shanghai Metro, and is within walking distance of the China Art Museum Station.

== See also ==
- Expo 2010
