= Guoquan Road station =

Shanghai Metro station

Guoquan Road 国权路
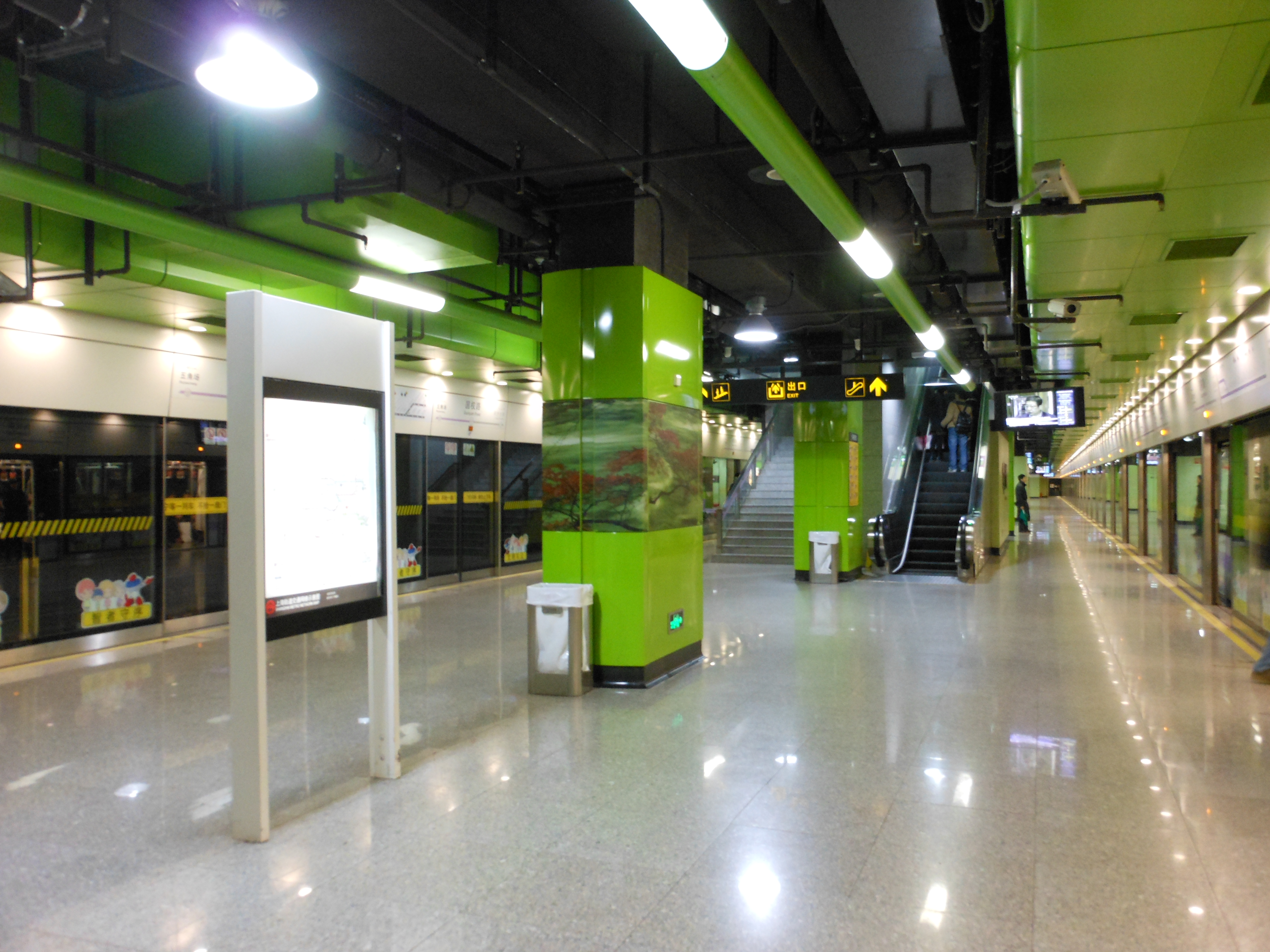
- Line 10 platform

General information
- Location: Siping Road and Guoquan Road (国权路); Wujiaochang Subdistrict, Yangpu District, Shanghai; China
- Coordinates: 31°17′29″N 121°30′20″E
- Operated by: Shanghai No. 1 Metro Operation Co., Ltd.
- Lines: Line 10; Line 18
- Platforms: 4 (2 island platforms)
- Tracks: 4

Construction
- Structure type: Underground
- Accessible: Yes

Other information
- Station code: L10/23 (Line 10)

History
- Opened: 10 April 2010 (Line 10); 30 December 2021 (Line 18)

Services
Preceding station	Shanghai Metro	Following station
Tongji University towards Hongqiao Railway Station or Hangzhong Road	Line 10	Wujiaochang towards Jilong Road
Fudan University towards Kangwen Road	Line 18	Fushun Road towards Hangtou
Location

Guoquan Road (simplified Chinese: 国权路; traditional Chinese: 國權路; pinyin: Guóquán Lù), is a station on Line 10 of the Shanghai Metro. It began operation on 10 April 2010. It is located at the intersection of Siping Road and Guoquan Road. It became an interchange station with Line 18 when the line opened on 30 December 2021.

== Station Layout ==
G	Entrances and Exits	Exits 1–4
B1	Line 10 Concourse	Faregates, Station Agent
B1	Line 18 Concourse	Faregates, Station Agent
B2	Westbound	← Line 10 towards Hongqiao Railway Station or Hangzhong Road (Tongji University)
B2	Island platform, doors open on the left
B2	Eastbound	Line 10 towards Jilong Road (Wujiaochang) →
B3	Northbound	← Line 18 towards South Changjiang Road (Fudan University)
B3	Island platform, doors open on the left
B3	Southbound	Line 18 towards Hangtou (Fushun Road) →

== Gallery ==
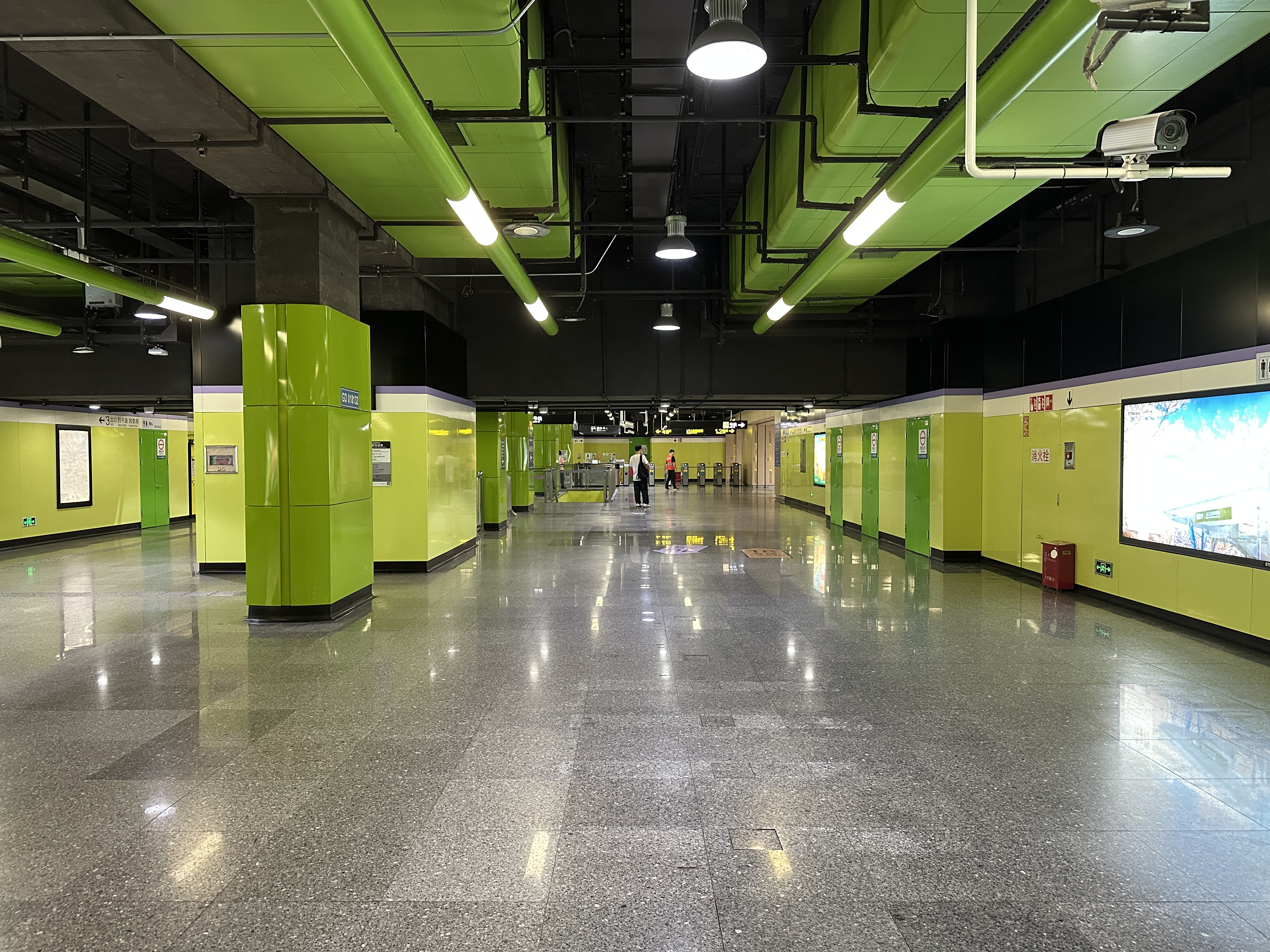
Line 10 concourse

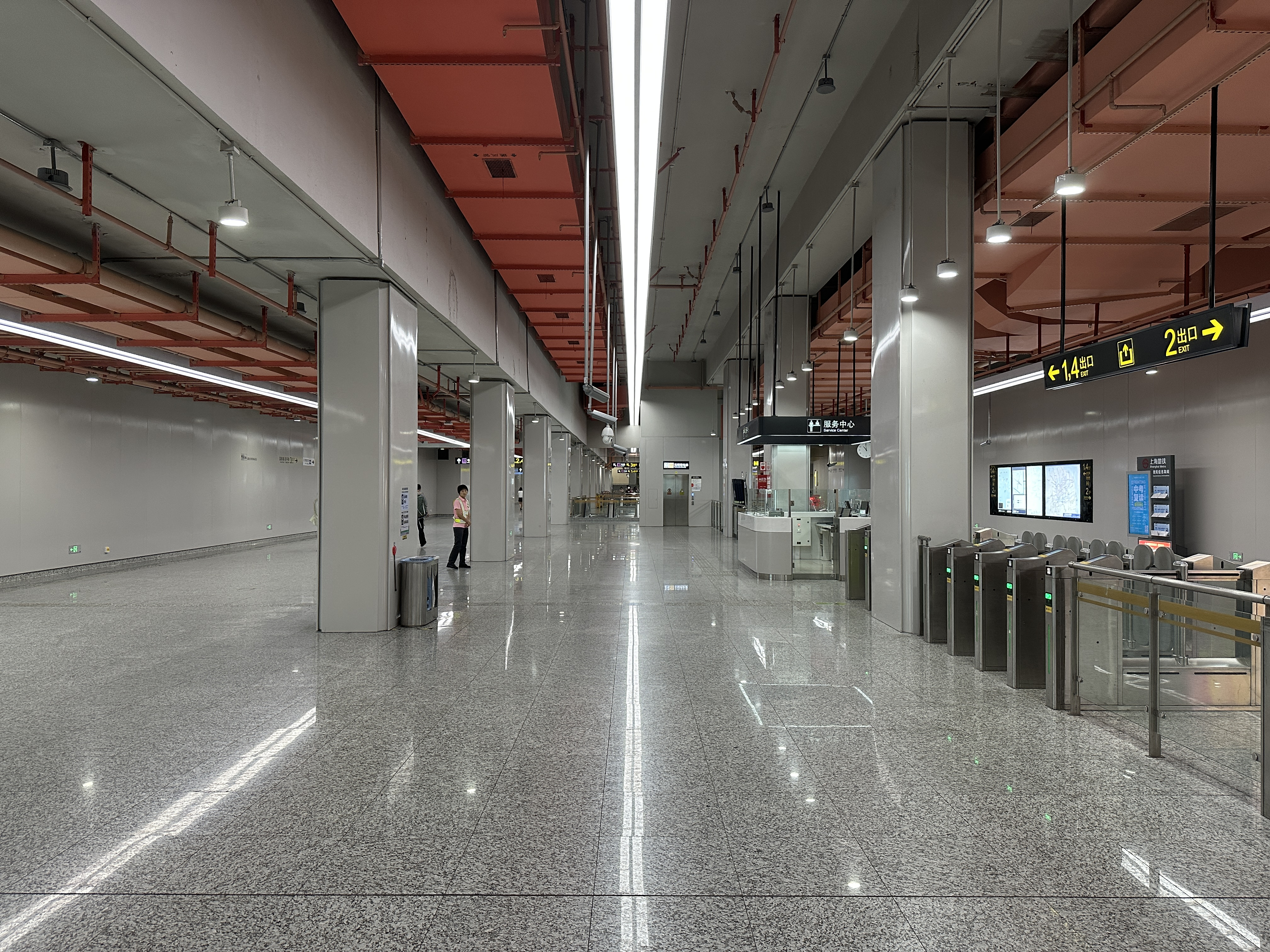
Line 18 platform

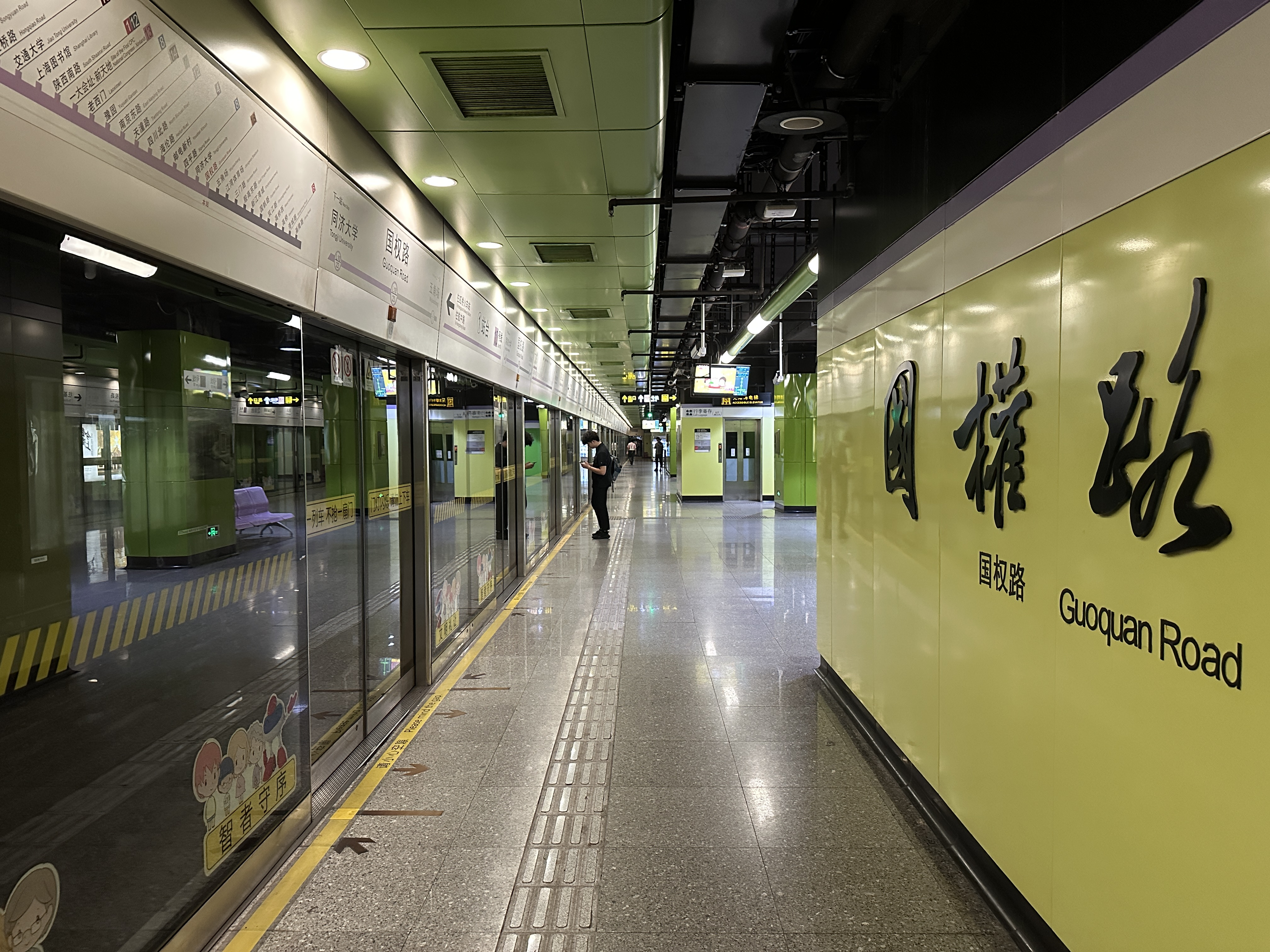
Line 10 platform

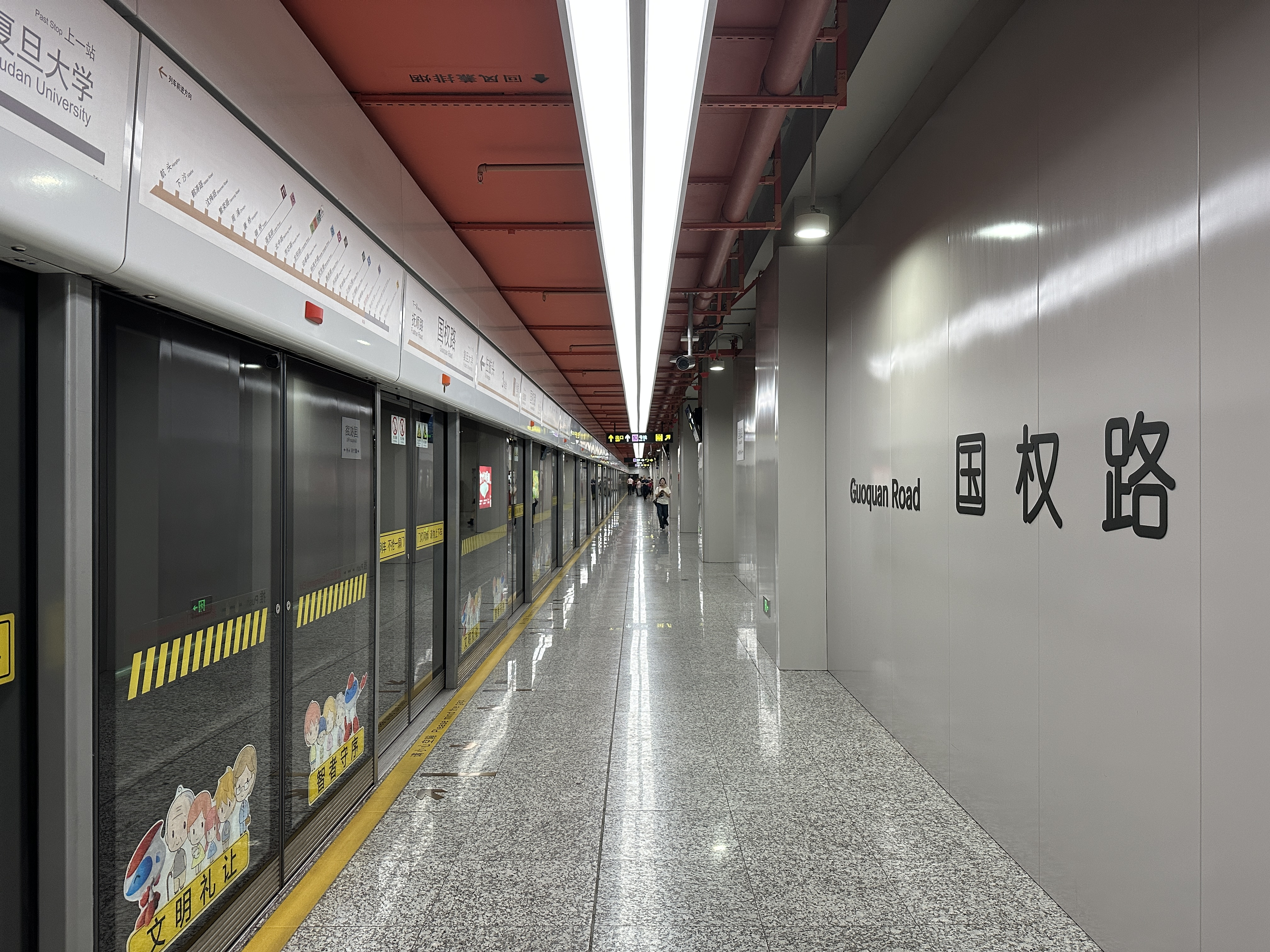
Line 18 platform
