= Nenjiang Road station =

Shanghai Metro station

Nenjiang Road 嫩江路
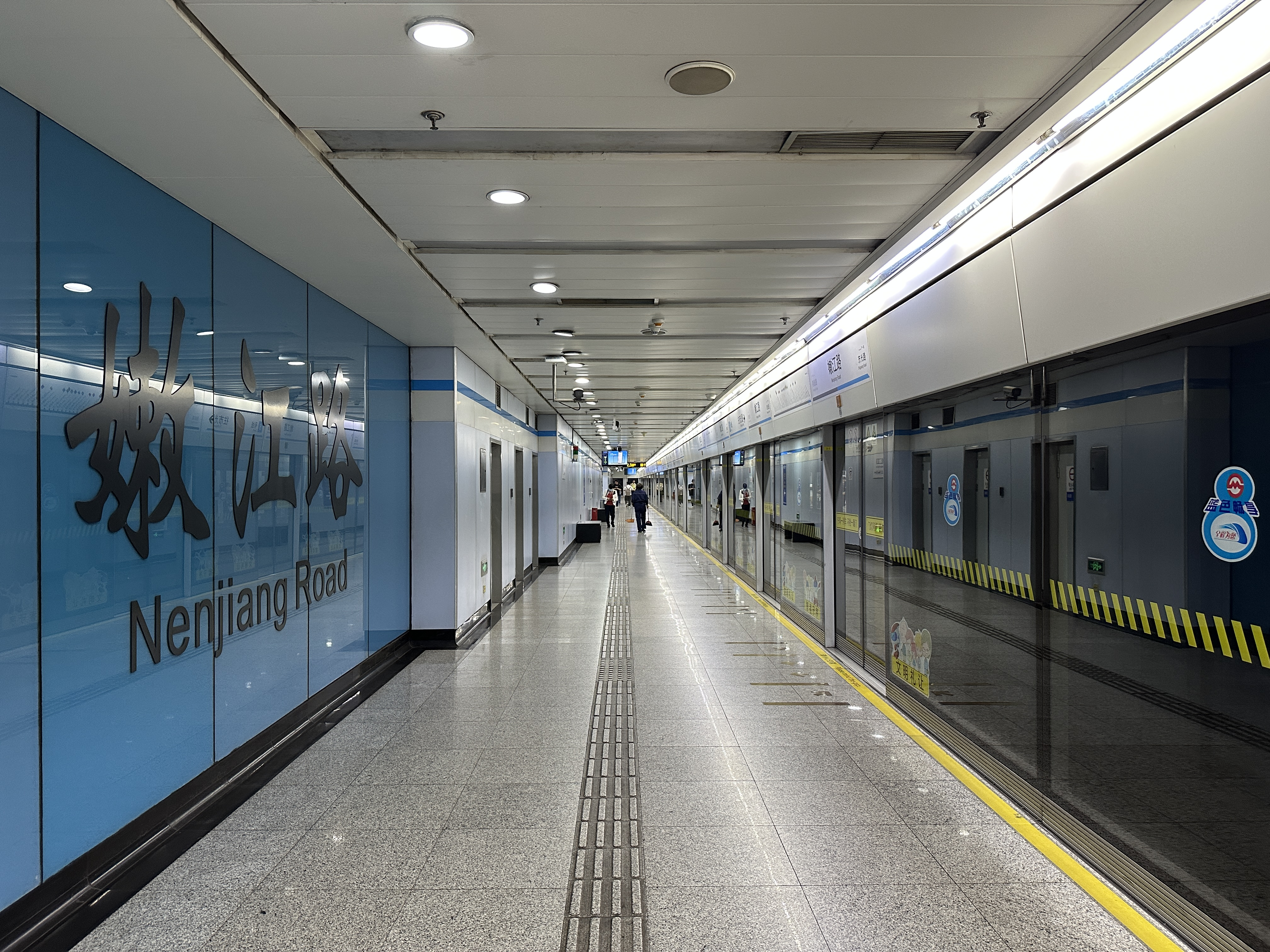
- Northbound station platform

General information
- Location: Zhongyuan Road and Nenjiang Road, Yangpu District, Shanghai; China
- Coordinates: 31.3161°N 121.527°E
- Operated by: Shanghai No. 4 Metro Operation Co. Ltd.
- Line: Line 8
- Platforms: 2 (2 side platforms)
- Tracks: 2
- Connections: 28, 61, 139, 522, 851, 854, Bridge Line No. 3

Construction
- Structure type: Underground
- Accessible: Yes

History
- Opened: December 29, 2007

Services
Preceding station	Shanghai Metro	Following station
Shiguang Road Terminus	Line 8	Xiangyin Road towards Shendu Highway
Location

Nenjiang Road (Chinese: 嫩江路; pinyin: Nènjiāng Lù) is the name of a station on Shanghai Metro Line 8. This station began operation on December 29, 2007. It is located at Zhongyuan Road and Nenjiang Road, in Yangpu District. It is also located near an Auchan superstore.

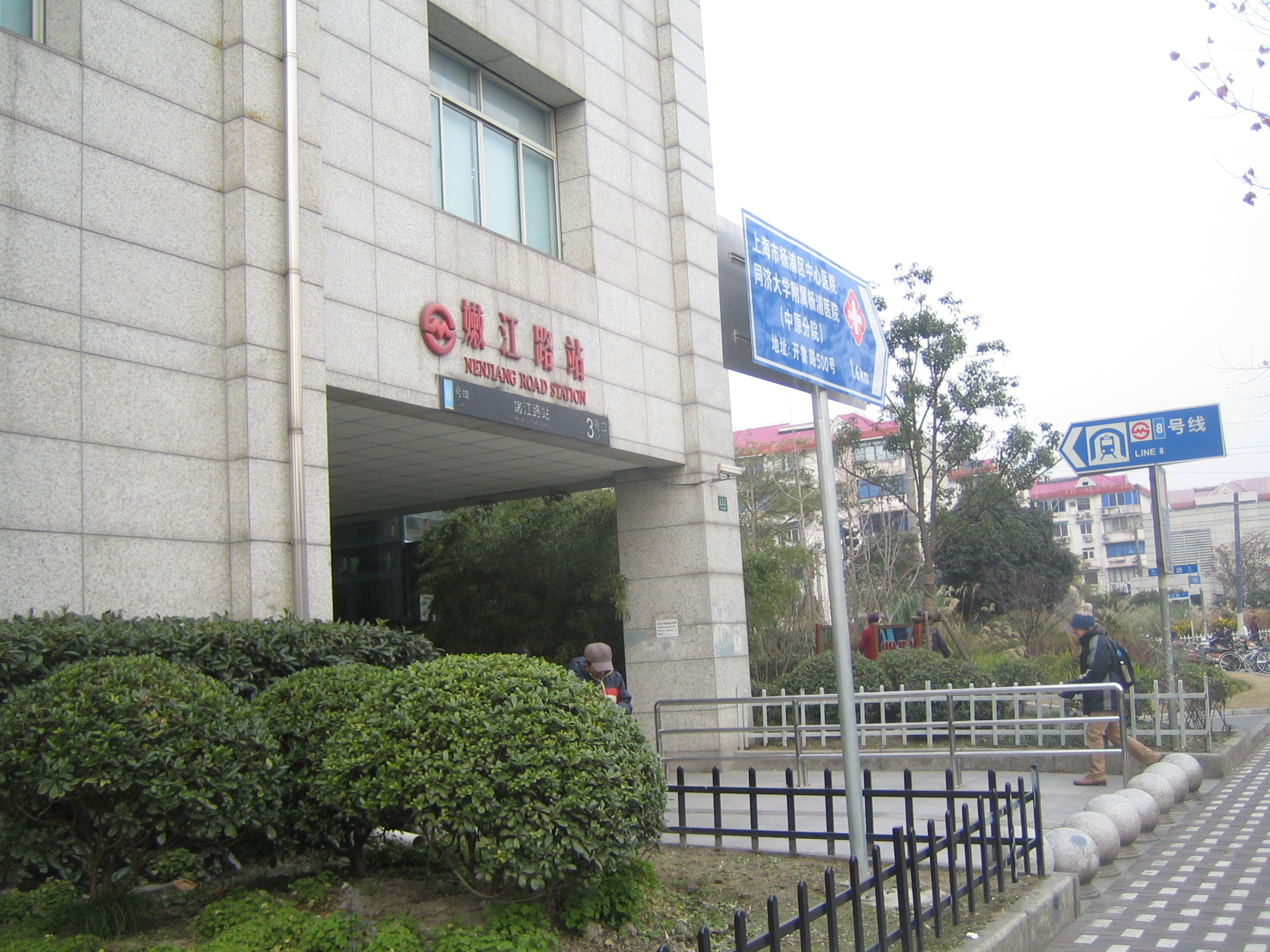
Exit 3

== Surface connections ==
Passengers can transfer to buses 28, 61, 139, 522, 851, 854, and Bridge Line No. 3 (大桥三线) from this station.
