= Fudan University station =

Shanghai Metro station

Fudan University 复旦大学站
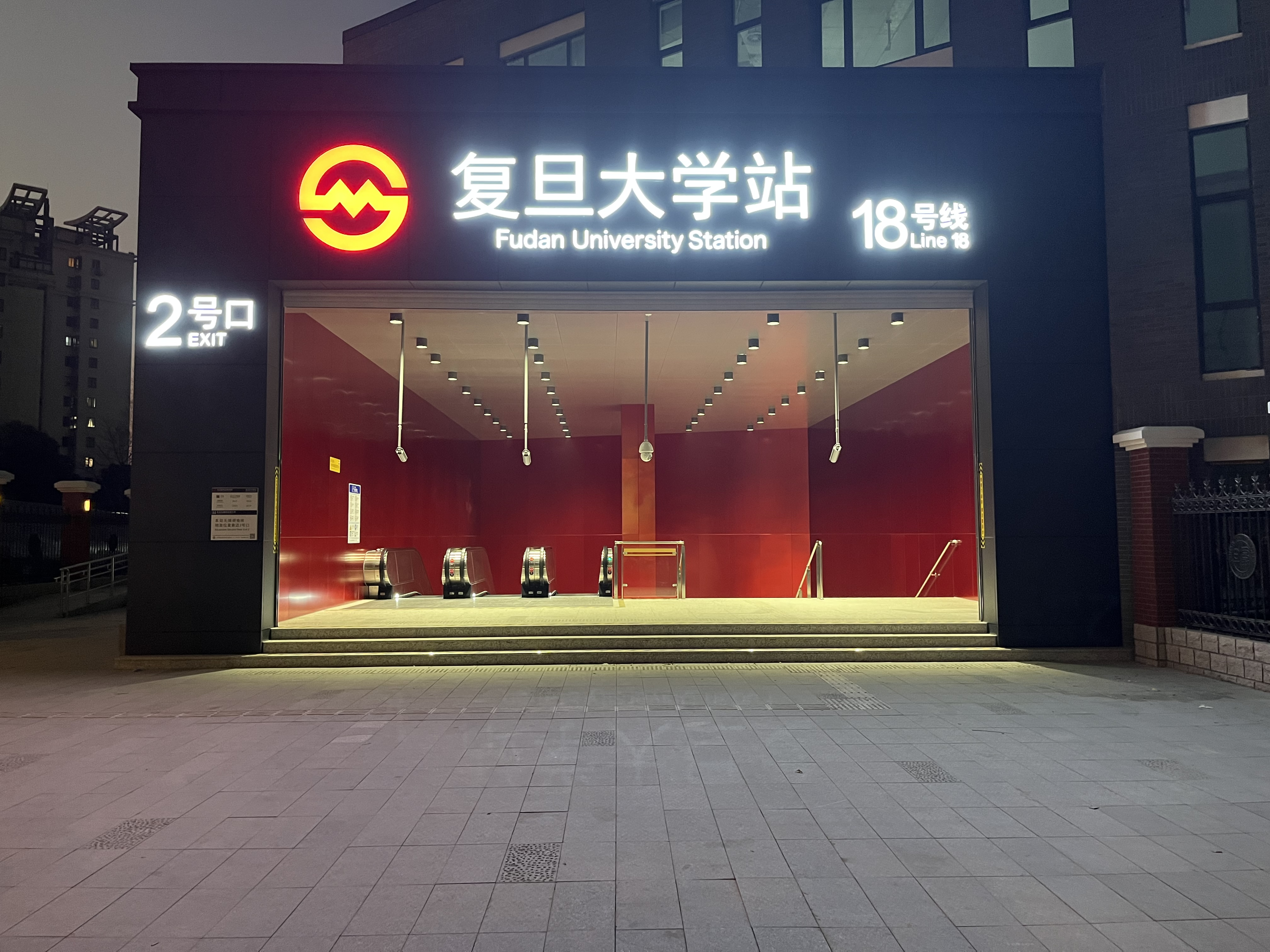
- Station entrance

General information
- Location: Handan Road and Guoquan Road, Yangpu District, Shanghai; China
- Coordinates: 31.297878°N 121.495765°E
- Line: Line 18
- Platforms: 2 (1 island platform)
- Tracks: 2

Construction
- Structure type: Underground

History
- Opened: 30 December 2021

Services
Preceding station	Shanghai Metro	Following station
Shanghai University of Finance and Economics towards Kangwen Road	Line 18	Guoquan Road towards Hangtou
Location

Fudan University station is a metro station of Line 18 as part of Shanghai Metro. Located west of the intersection of Handan Road and Guoquan Road in Yangpu District, Shanghai, the station is located on the western edge of the Handan campus of Fudan University, the main campus of the university. It opened with the rest of phase one of Line 18 on December 30, 2021.
