= Line 8 (Shanghai Metro) =

Metro line of the Shanghai Metro

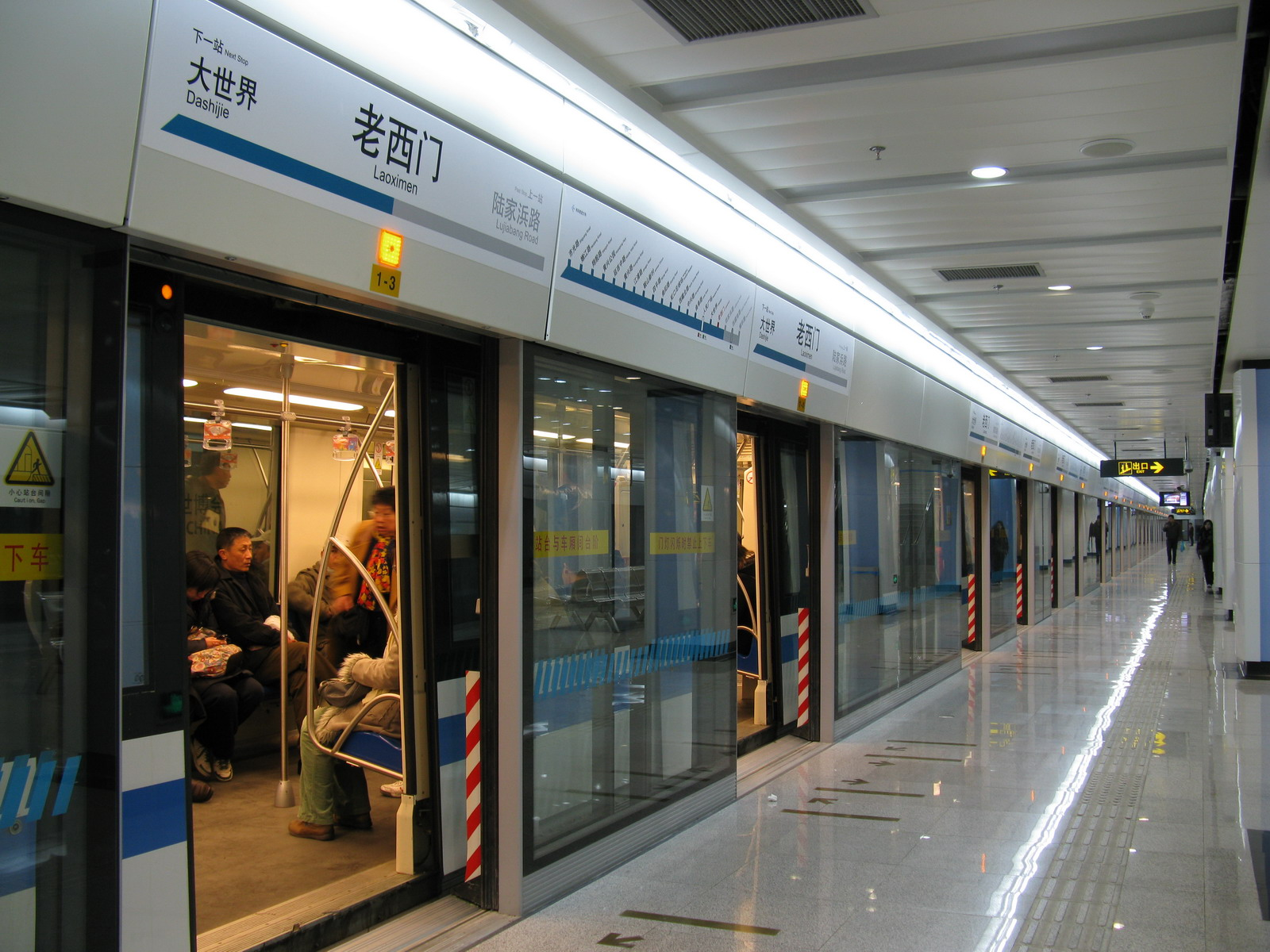
- An AC07 train at Laoximen station

Overview
- Other name(s): M8 (planned name); Yangpu line (Chinese: 杨浦线)
- Native name: 上海地铁8号线
- Status: Operational
- Owner: Shanghai Rail Transit Yangpu Line Development Co., Ltd.
- Locale: Minhang, Pudong, Huangpu, Jing'an, Hongkou and Yangpu districts, Shanghai, China
- Termini: Shiguang Road; Shendu Highway
- Stations: 30

Service
- Type: Rapid transit
- System: Shanghai Metro
- Services: Mainline: Shiguang Road ↔ Shendu Highway; Core: Middle Yanji Road ↔ Oriental Sports Center (not operating during working day peak); Peak: Middle Yanji Road ↔ Shendu Highway (only operating during working day peak)
- Operator: Shanghai No. 4 Metro Operation Co. Ltd.
- Depot(s): Yinhang Depot; Pujiang Town Yard
- Rolling stock: 08C01; 08C02; 08C03; 08C04
- Daily ridership: 1.221 million (2019 peak)

History
- Work began: December 21, 2001; 24 years ago
- Opened: December 29, 2007; 18 years ago
- Last extension: July 5, 2009; 17 years ago

Technical
- Line length: 37.4 km (23.24 mi)
- Number of tracks: 2
- Character: Underground and elevated
- Track gauge: 1,435 mm (4 ft 8 1/2 in)
- Electrification: Overhead lines (1500 volts)
- Operating speed: 80 km/h (50 mph); Average speed 31.0 km/h (19 mph)
- Signalling: Thales’ SelTracTM CBTC
Route map
Route on the Shanghai map:
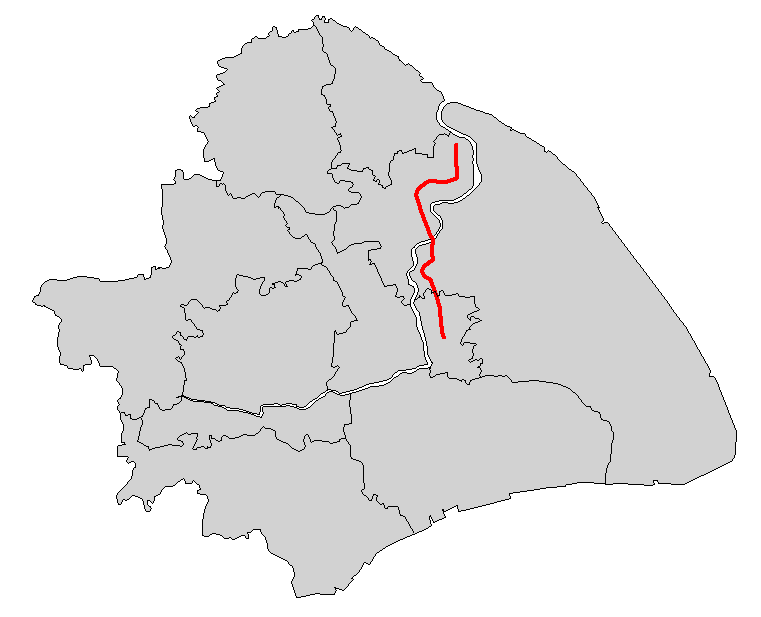
To scale geographic map:

Line 8 is a north-south line of the Shanghai Metro network. It runs from Shiguang Road, in Yangpu District to Shendu Highway, in Minhang. The line is colored blue on system maps.

== History ==
The subway line's first phase began trial operation on September 17, 2007 and officially opened on December 29, 2007, running between Shiguang Road and Yaohua Road. The second phase, from Yaohua Road to Shendu Highway began operation on July 5, 2009.

Two stations opened later than the rest of the line: China Art Museum in September 2012 and Oriental Sports Center opened in April 2011.

On May 4, 2017 it was announced the third phase had been renamed the Pujiang line, and will be a new 6.7 km (4.2 mi) long automated people mover line running from Shendu Highway station to Huizhen Road station. It will use rubber tire Bombardier Innovia APM 300 technology. On January 13 Bombardier delivered the first out of 44 autonomous people movers to Shanghai. It opened on March 31, 2018.

Shanghai Metro Line 8 opening history
| Segment | Commencement | Opened | Length | Station(s) | Name | Investment |
|---|---|---|---|---|---|---|
| Shiguang Road — Yaohua Road | 21 Dec 2001 | 29 Dec 2007 | 23.3 km (14.48 mi) | 20 | Phase 1 | ¥14.493 billion |
| Yaohua Road — Shendu Highway | 27 Dec 2005 | 5 Jul 2009 | 14.1 km (8.76 mi) | 8 | Phase 2 | ¥5.332 billion |
| Oriental Sports Center | | 12 Apr 2011 | Infill station | 1 |
| China Art Museum | | 28 Sep 2012 | Infill station | 1 |

=== Controversy ===
Even though Line 8 is a heavy rail rapid transit line, Class C trains designed for light metro lines consisting of 6 or 7 cars are being used throughout the line. Due to the trains relatively smaller loading gauge and capacity compared to Class A trains used on other Shanghai Metro lines, the line is extremely crowded. This has caused much doubt among the public in Shanghai Metro's ability to accurately predict passenger flows for future lines. It was revealed that Line 8 originally was forecasted to have a short term daily ridership of 400,000-500,000 people/day, which warrants the use of larger Class A trains on other Shanghai Metro lines. This is not surprising given Line 8 is planned to serve some of Shanghai's densest neighborhoods and several major attractions. However the forecast was revised many times and finally downgraded to 200,000 people/day through "internal negotiation and coordination", which allowed Shanghai Alstom, a company interested in manufacturing and selling Class C trains in Shanghai, to build trains for Line 8. Chief designer Yu Jiakang noted that in addition to short term solutions such as operating 7 car trains and reducing headways, last resort is to rebuild Line 8 as the loading gauges of Class C trains are incompatible with Class C trains. Additionally, parallel relief bus services have started operating. The initial 28 trainsets were 6-car consists. Due to overcrowding, subsequent train purchases (62 sets) were 7-car sets. There was a canceled plan to expand 08C01 stocks from the 6-car sets to 7-car sets.

== Stations ==
=== Service routes ===
Shanghai Metro Line 8 service routes
M - Mainline: Shiguang Road ↔ Shendu Highway; C - Core: Middle Yanji Road ↔ Oriental Sports Center (not operating during working day peak); P - Peak: Middle Yanji Road ↔ Shendu Highway (only operating during working day peak)
| Routes | | | Station name | | Connections | Distance | | | Location | Open- ing | Plat- form |
| M | C | P | English | Chinese | Connections | km | | min | Location | Open- ing | Plat- form |
| ● | | | Shiguang Road | 市光路 | | 0.00 | 0.00 | 0 | Yangpu | 29 Dec 2007 | Underground Side |
| ● | | | Nenjiang Road | 嫩江路 | | 0.88 | 0.88 | 2 | Yangpu | 29 Dec 2007 | Underground Side |
| ● | | | Xiangyin Road | 翔殷路 | | 1.07 | 1.95 | 5 | Yangpu | 29 Dec 2007 | Underground Side |
| ● | | | Huangxing Park | 黄兴公园 | | 1.04 | 2.99 | 7 | Yangpu | 29 Dec 2007 | Underground Side |
| ● | ● | ● | Middle Yanji Road | 延吉中路 | | 0.85 | 3.84 | 9 | Yangpu | 29 Dec 2007 | Underground Island |
| ● | ● | ● | Huangxing Road | 黄兴路 | | 1.41 | 5.25 | 11 | Yangpu | 29 Dec 2007 | Underground Island |
| ● | ● | ● | Jiangpu Road | 江浦路 | 18 | 1.04 | 6.29 | 14 | Yangpu | 29 Dec 2007 | Underground Island |
| ● | ● | ● | Anshan Xincun | 鞍山新村 | | 0.88 | 7.17 | 16 | Yangpu | 29 Dec 2007 | Underground Island |
| ● | ● | ● | Siping Road | 四平路 | 10 | 0.81 | 7.98 | 17 | Hongkou | 29 Dec 2007 | Underground Island |
| ● | ● | ● | Quyang Road | 曲阳路 | | 1.07 | 9.05 | 20 | Hongkou | 29 Dec 2007 | Underground Side |
| ● | ● | ● | Hongkou Football Stadium | 虹口足球场 | 3 | 1.47 | 10.52 | 22 | Hongkou | 29 Dec 2007 | Underground Island |
| ● | ● | ● | North Xizang Road | 西藏北路 | | 1.27 | 11.79 | 25 | Jing'an | 29 Dec 2007 | Underground Island |
| ● | ● | ● | Zhongxing Road | 中兴路 | | 1.23 | 13.02 | 27 | Jing'an | 29 Dec 2007 | Underground Island |
| ● | ● | ● | Qufu Road | 曲阜路 | 12 | 1.19 | 14.21 | 30 | Jing'an | 29 Dec 2007 | Underground Island |
| ● | ● | ● | People's Square | 人民广场 | 1 2 | 1.18 | 15.39 | 32 | Huangpu | 29 Dec 2007 | Underground Island & Side |
| ● | ● | ● | Dashijie | 大世界 | 14 | 0.74 | 16.13 | 34 | Huangpu | 29 Dec 2007 | Underground Island |
| ● | ● | ● | Laoximen | 老西门 | 10 | 0.96 | 17.09 | 36 | Huangpu | 29 Dec 2007 | Underground Island |
| ● | ● | ● | Lujiabang Road | 陆家浜路 | 9 | 0.85 | 17.94 | 38 | Huangpu | 29 Dec 2007 | Underground Island |
| ● | ● | ● | South Xizang Road | 西藏南路 | 4 | 1.12 | 19.06 | 40 | Huangpu | 29 Dec 2007 | Underground Island |
| ● | ● | ● | China Art Museum | 中华艺术宫 | | 2.11 | 21.17 | 43 | Pudong | 28 Sept 2012 | Underground Island |
| ● | ● | ● | Yaohua Road | 耀华路 | 7 | 0.90 | 22.07 | 46 | Pudong | 29 Dec 2007 | Underground Side |
| ● | ● | ● | Chengshan Road | 成山路 | 13 | 0.90 | 22.97 | 48 | Pudong | 5 July 2009 | Underground Island |
| ● | ● | ● | Yangsi | 杨思 | | 1.13 | 24.10 | 50 | Pudong | 5 July 2009 | Underground Island |
| ● | ● | ● | Oriental Sports Center | 东方体育中心 | 6 11 | 1.67 | 25.77 | 53 | Pudong | 12 April 2011 | Underground Island |
| ● | | ● | Lingzhao Xincun | 凌兆新村 | | 1.83 | 27.60 | 57 | Pudong | 5 July 2009 | Underground Island |
| ● | | ● | Luheng Road | 芦恒路 | | 2.57 | 30.17 | 60 | Minhang | 5 July 2009 | Underground Island |
| ● | | ● | Pujiang Town | 浦江镇 | | 2.61 | 32.78 | 64 | Minhang | 5 July 2009 | Elevated Island |
| ● | | ● | Jiangyue Road | 江月路 | | 1.39 | 34.17 | 66 | Minhang | 5 July 2009 | Elevated Island |
| ● | | ● | Lianhang Road | 联航路 | | 1.20 | 35.37 | 69 | Minhang | 5 July 2009 | Elevated Island |
| ● | | ● | Shendu Highway | 沈杜公路 | Pujiang Fengpu BRT | 1.36 | 36.73 | 71 | Minhang | 5 July 2009 | Elevated Island |

=== Important stations ===
- Hongkou Football Stadium - At this station, passengers can transfer to line 3. Previously they must exit and re-enter the station, but a new linkway has been built via the shopping center.
- People's Square - Passengers can interchange to lines 1 and 2. This is also a very important station, as it is located at a major financial district as well as near many tourist attractions.
- South Xizang Road: The first platform to platform interchange station in the Shanghai Metro network. Interchange with line 4.

=== Station name change ===
- On May 7, 2011, Jiyang Road was renamed Oriental Sports Center.
- On June 9, 2013, the Aerospace Museum was renamed Shendu Highway.

== Headways ==
Shanghai Metro Line 8 headway
| Time | | Shiguang Road - Middle Yanji Road | Middle Yanji Road - Oriental Sports Center | Oriental Sports Center - Shendu Highway |
Monday - Friday (Working Days)
| AM peak | 7:15–9:20 | About 3 mins and 30 sec | About 2 min and 15 sec |
| Off-peak | 9:20–17:00 | About 8 min | About 4 min | About 8 min |
| PM peak | 17:00–19:20 | About 5 min and 30 sec | About 2 min and 45 sec |
| Other hours | Before 7:30 After 20:00 | About 10 - 12 min | About 5 - 6 min | About 10 - 12 min |
Saturday and Sunday (Weekends)
| Peak | 8:00–19:00 | 3 min and 40 sec - 7 min and 20 sec | About 3 min and 40 sec | 3 min and 40 sec - 7 min and 20 sec |
| Other hours | Before 8:00 After 19:00 | About 10 - 12 min | About 5 - 6 min | About 10 - 12 min |

== Technology ==
=== Signaling ===
From June 19 to July 1, 2009, during the second phase of line 8 signal commissioning (upgrade from fully manual driving to CBTC semi-automatic driving), the first phase of operation efficiency was unstable, and trains stopped frequently. As a result, the driving time was much longer than normal, resulting in passenger congestion and seven consecutive large-scale signal failures. After investigation by the Shentong Metro, it was found that the main reason for the stoppage of the train on Line 8 was that the communication transmission time set by the CBTC on-board software was too short, which caused the train to transmit too much data to the central computer, and the train was unable to accurately receive wireless signals. On July 2, 2009, after all the on-board software of the train was updated to resolve this issue.

=== Rolling stock ===
The designed speed of the train is 80 km/h, the length is 19.49 meters (Tc)/19.44 meters (Mp, M) (compare to longer, more common Class A carriages at 23 meters), and the width is 2.6 meters (Class A carriages are wider at 3.0 meters).

Shanghai Metro Line 8 rolling stock
| Fleet numbers | Manufacturer | Time of manufac- turing | Class | No of car | Assembly (Note: Tc: Trailer with cab; Mp: EMU with pantograph; M: EMU without pantograph.) | Rolling stock | Number | Notes |
|---|---|---|---|---|---|---|---|---|
| 168 | Alstom France (0801); SATCO (Note: SATCO (Shanghai Alstom Transportation Equipment Co., Ltd.) is a joint venture between Alstom Metropolis and Shanghai Electric.) (0802-0828) | 2006-2008 | C (Note: Class C carriage: 19.44m in length, 2.6m in width and 3.8m in height; Capacity: about 200 people.) | 6 | Tc+Mp+M+M+Mp+Tc | 08C01 | 0801-0828 (080011-081681) | 6 cars (080011-080061) built by CAF. Original name: AC07. |
| 126 | CRRC Changchun Railway Vehicles Co., Ltd. | 2009-2010 | C | 7 | Tc+Mp+M+M+M+Mp+Tc | 08C02 | 0829-0846 (081691-082941) | Original name: AC15A. |
| 140 | CRRC Changchun Railway Vehicles Co., Ltd. | 2010-2011 | C | 7 | Tc+Mp+M+M+M+Mp+Tc | 08C03 | 0847-0866 (082951-083341) | Original name: AC15B. |
| 168 | CRRC Changchun Railway Vehicles Co., Ltd. | 2018-2020 | C | 7 | Tc+Mp+M+M+M+Mp+Tc | 08C04 | 08067-08090 (083351-085301) |

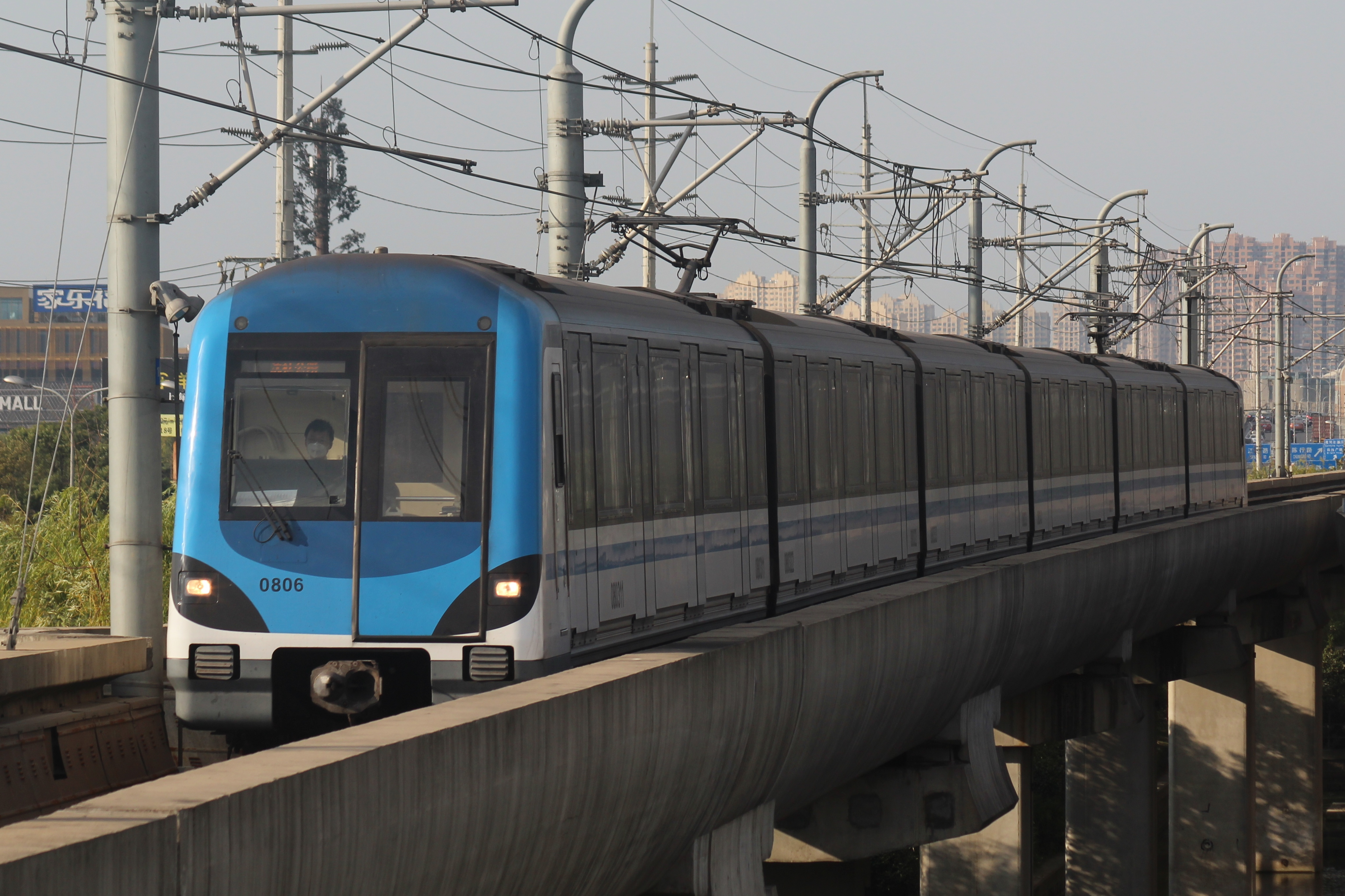
08C01 train

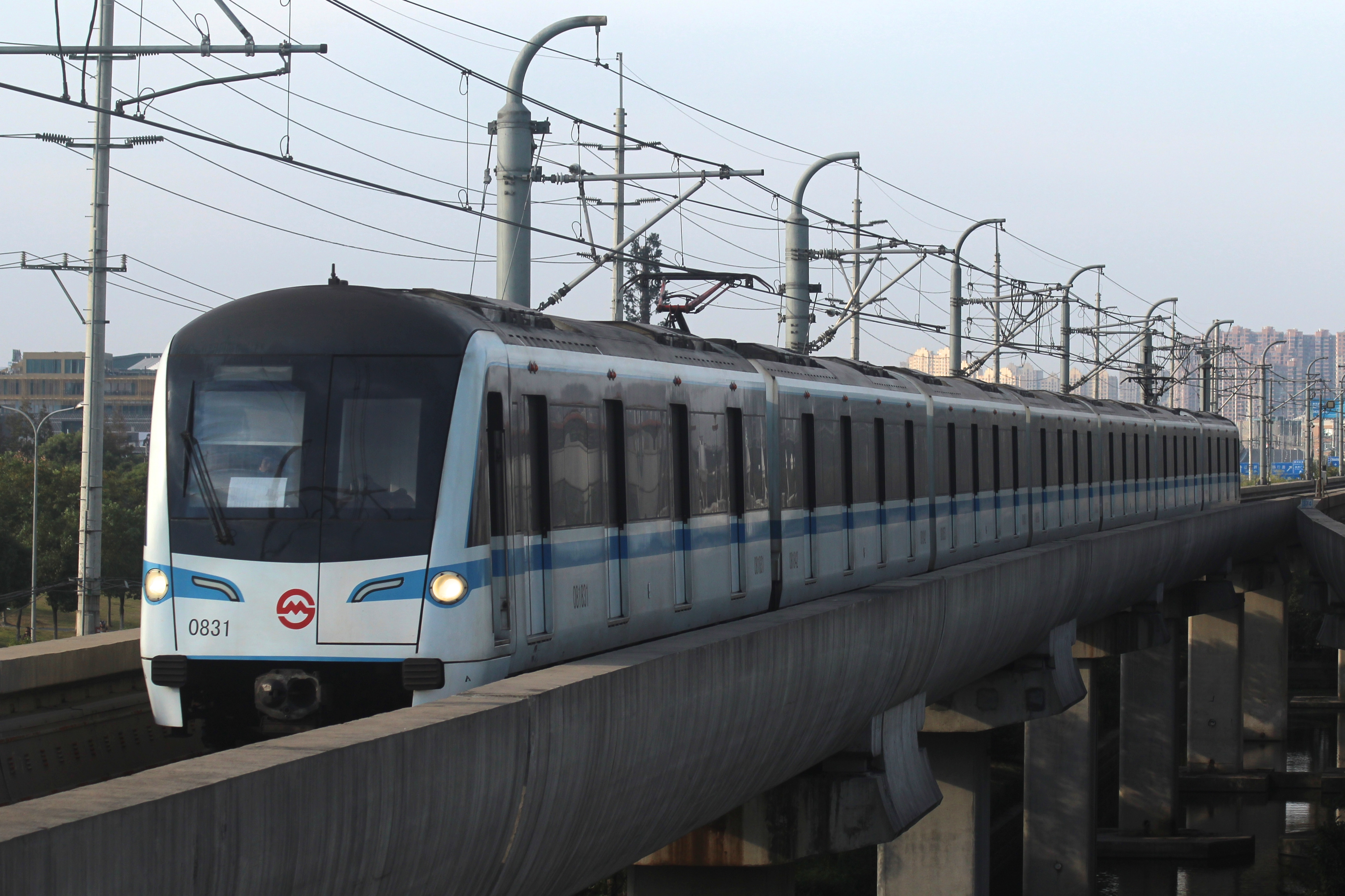
08C02 train
