= Shiguang Road station =

Shanghai Metro station

Shiguang Road 市光路
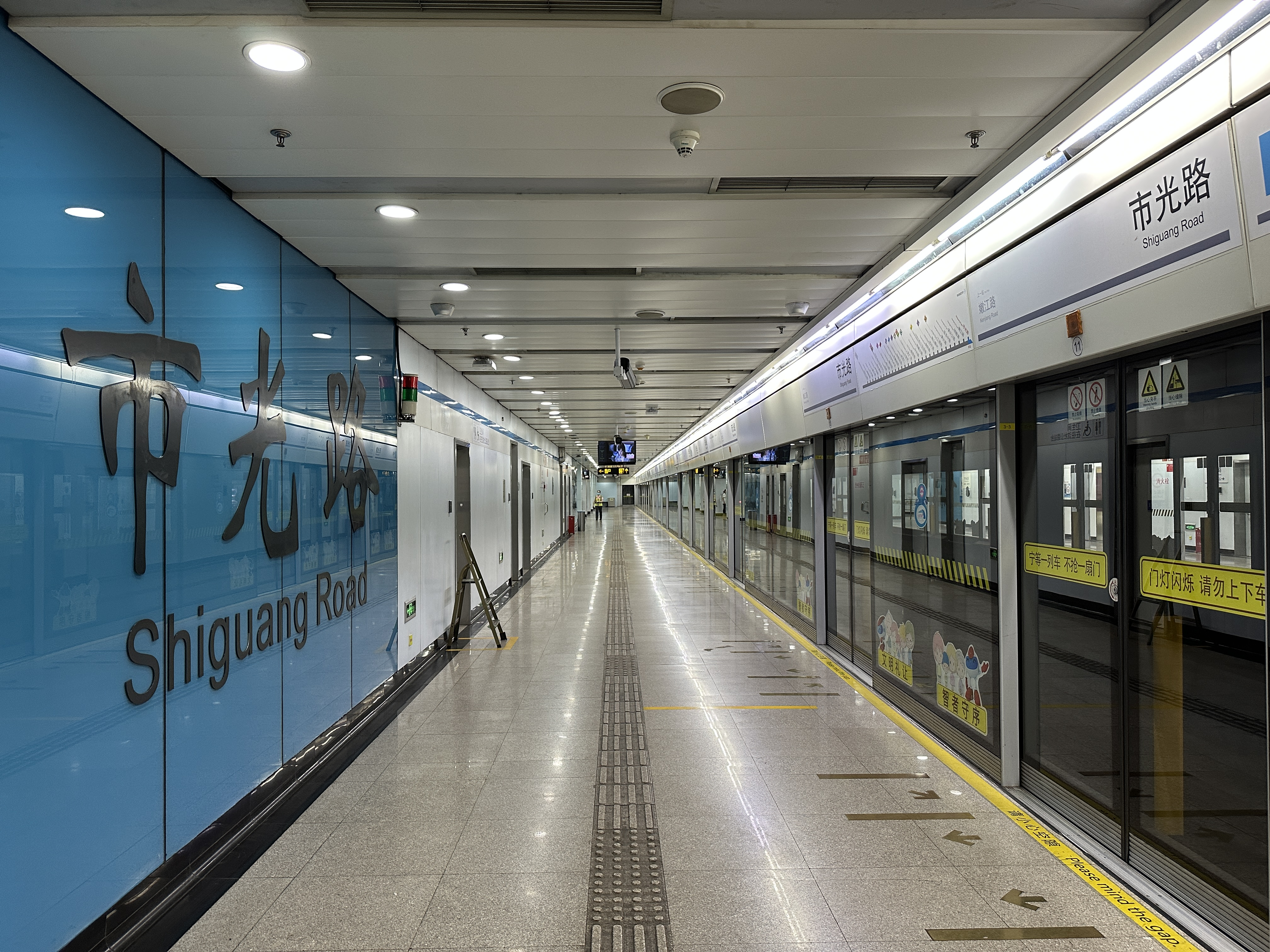
- Northbound station platform

General information
- Location: Yangpu District, Shanghai; China
- Coordinates: 31°19′25″N 121°31′39″E
- Operated by: Shanghai No. 4 Metro Operation Co. Ltd.
- Line: Line 8
- Platforms: 2 (2 side platforms)
- Tracks: 2

Construction
- Structure type: Underground
- Accessible: Yes

History
- Opened: 29 December 2007

Services
Preceding station	Shanghai Metro	Following station
Terminus	Line 8	Nenjiang Road towards Shendu Highway
Location

Shiguang Road (Chinese: 市光路; pinyin: Shìguāng Lù) is a Shanghai Metro station in the city's Yangpu District. The station is the current northern terminus of Line 8 and is located on Zhongyuan Road between Kailu Road and Shiguang Road.

The station was opened on 29 December 2007 as part of the first phase of Shanghai Metro Line 8 from Shiguang Road to Yaohua Road. There are two side platforms, one for passengers boarding trains, and the other for disembarking trains. As the northern terminus of the line, passengers must exit upon arrival. The train then proceeds north to the depot at Zhongyuan Road and Guowei Road, where it reverses and resumes service southbound.

== Exits ==
- Exit 1: Kailu Road, east side of Zhongyuan Road
- Exit 2: Shiguang Road, east side of Zhongyuan Road
- Exit 3: Shiguang Road, west side of Zhongyuan Road
- Exit 4: Kailu Road, west side of Zhongyuan Road

== Surface connections ==
Passengers can transfer to bus routes 537, 538, 577, 726, 758, 813, 817, and 870 at the station.
