= University of Shanghai for Science and Technology =

Public university in Shanghai, China

- 上海理工大学
- Former names: University of Shanghai; East China University of Technology; Shanghai Institute of Mechanical Technology
- Motto: 信义勤爱 思学志远
- Type: Public University
- Established: 1906; 120 years ago
- President: Professor Zhu Xinyuan 朱新远
- Faculty: 1,600
- Students: 24,600
- Undergraduates: 17,400
- Postgraduates: 7,200
- Location: Shanghai, China; 31.290124°N 121.552256°E
- Nicknames: 上海理工 上理
- Website: www.usst.edu.cn

University of Shanghai for Science and Technology
- Simplified Chinese: 上海理工大学
- Traditional Chinese: 上海理工大學
Transcriptions
Standard Mandarin
- Hanyu Pinyin: Shànghǎi Lǐgōng Dàxué

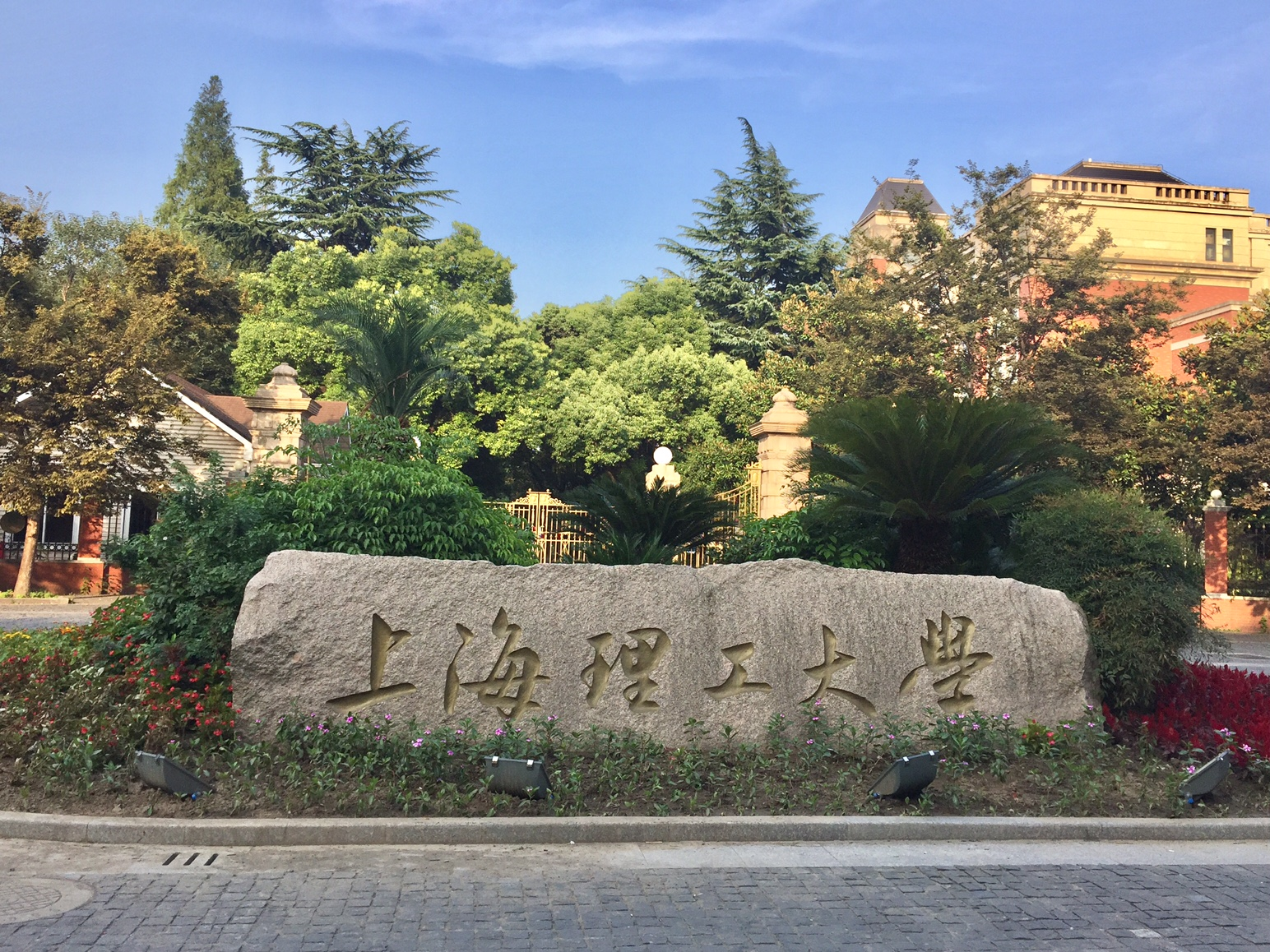

The University of Shanghai for Science and Technology (USST; 上海理工大学) is a municipal public university in Yangpu, Shanghai, China. The university is affiliated with the City of Shanghai and funded by the Shanghai Municipal People's Government.

The school originated from the Hujiang University founded in 1906 and the German Medicine and Engineering School founded in 1907. In the early 1950s, the former Hujiang University and the former National Shanghai Advanced Mechanical Vocational School were respectively reorganized into Shanghai Institute of Mechanical Engineering (renamed East China University of Technology in 1994) and Shanghai Mechanical College. In 1996, the two schools merged to form University of Shanghai for Science and Technology. In 1998, the school was transferred from the former Ministry of Machinery Industry to the management of the Municipality of Shanghai.

== History ==
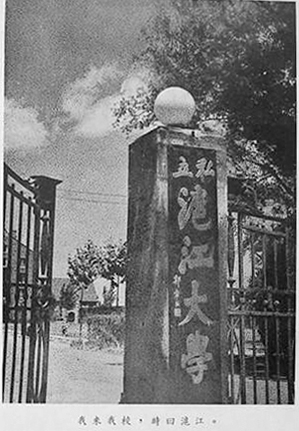
University of Shanghai

=== Origins ===
The University of Shanghai for Science and Technology was originally built by the Northern and Southern Baptists of the United States on 26.5 acres of land purchased in late 1905. The first president of the college, originally known as the Shanghai Baptist College and Seminary, was John Thomas Proctor, a Baptist missionary appointed by the board of trustees in August 1906 during a meeting in Moganshan. Proctor was president and professor of history and philosophy at the college until the fall of 1910 when he was replaced by Dr. F. J. White as acting president. The first Chinese professor at the college was Mr. Tong Tsing-En. The first Chinese president was Dr. Herman C. E. Liu from 1928 to 1938.

=== Development ===
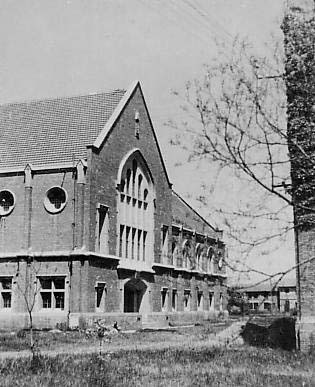
University of Shanghai

USST is the amalgamation of East China University of Technology and Shanghai Institute of Mechanical Technology. The former originated from Shanghai Industry School, set up on the original campus of Hujiang University (1906–1952) after the establishment of the People's Republic of China. The latter originated from Deutsche Medizinschule, created in 1907. Between 1960 and 1994, the school was known as Shanghai Institute of Mechanism (上海機械學院). In May 1996, East China University of Technology and Shanghai Institute of Mechanical Technology were amalgamated and established as USST. Due to this historical heritage, the English name of the university begins with its predecessor (University of Shanghai) to show the origins of USST.

== Academics and Research ==
=== Structures ===
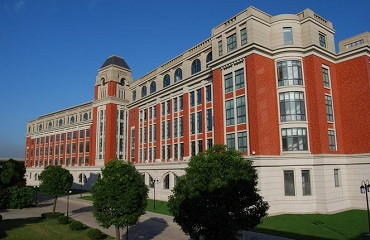
USST Main Building

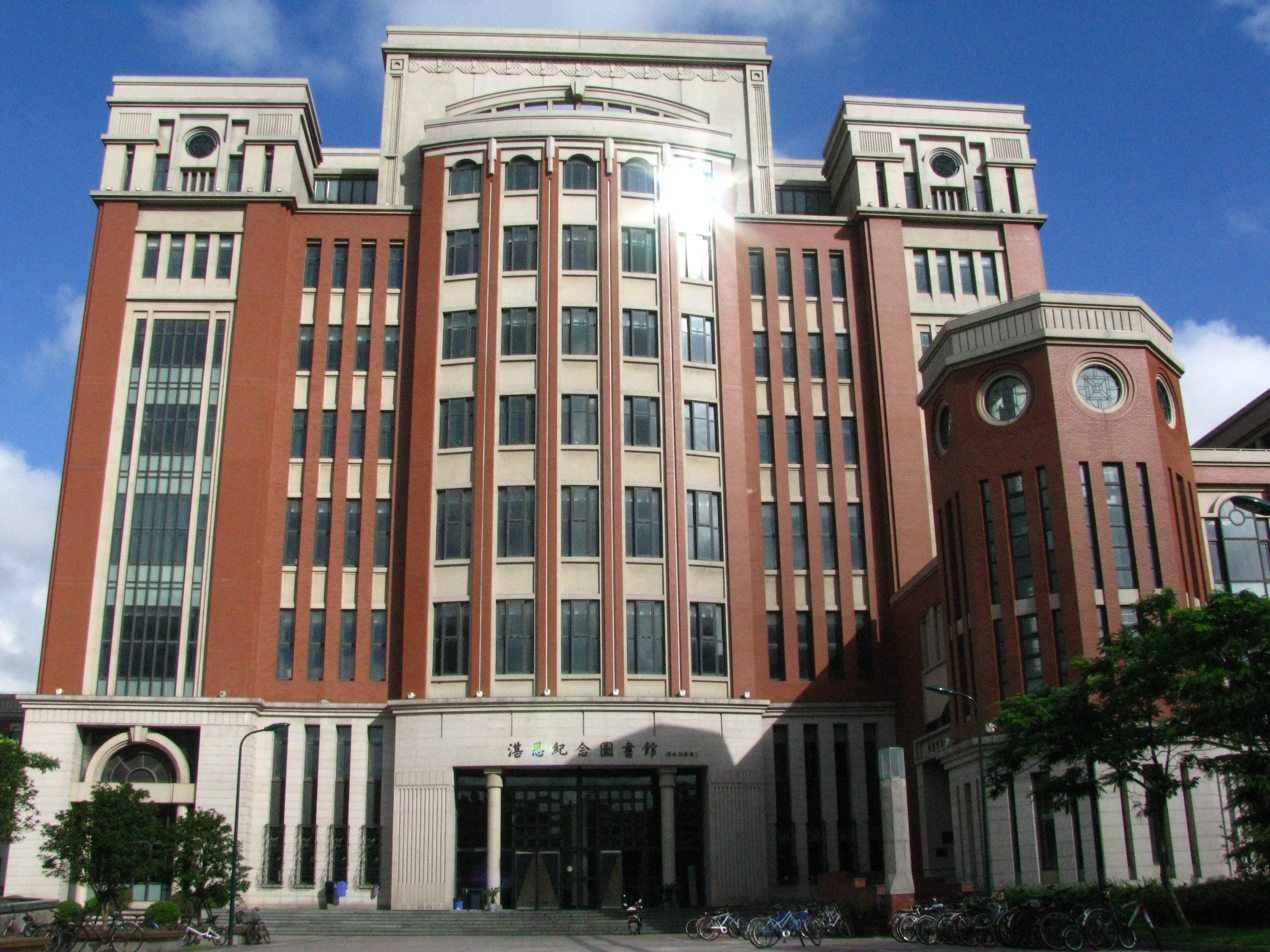
Library

The University of Shanghai for Science and Technology (USST) is a multidisciplinary university with emphasis on engineering (its main major), management, commerce, arts, science and medicine. In September 1998, according to the principle of "co-established by both central government and local government, mainly managed by Shanghai Municipality", along with its jurisdiction transferred from the former Ministry of Machinery Industry to Shanghai Municipality, USST became a new-style municipal higher learning institute. In July 2003, due to the readjustment of universities in Shanghai, Shanghai Medical Apparatus and Instruments College and Shanghai Publishing and Printing Training School were put under the administration of USST. They were established respectively as its College of Medical Apparatus and Instruments, and Publishing and Printing College.

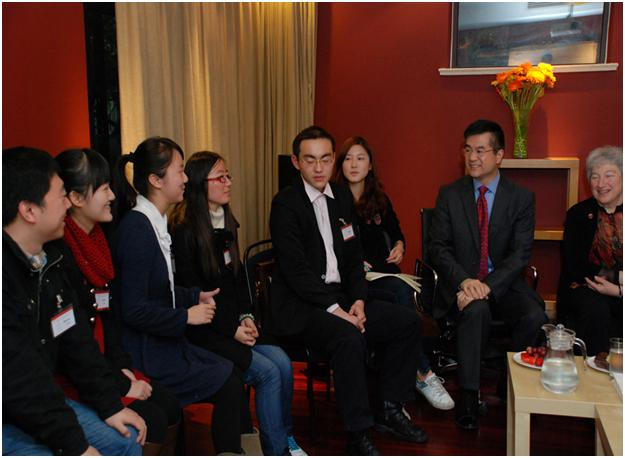
Gary Locke, US Ambassador to China visits American Culture Centre, USST

As of 2016, USST has 18 colleges or schools, one teaching faculties; among them, there are 44 research institutes, 26 research centers and 3 research associations. The total number of full-time students is 24,600, including 17,400 undergraduates, 7,200 candidates for master's degrees and Doctor Degree. It has established six disciplines (science, engineering, economics, management, arts and medicine), 19 specialties, 54 bachelor majors, four post-doctoral research station; five Ph.D. conferring disciplines, 91 second-rate master conferring disciplines, and 10 engineering and MBA conferring disciplines. It also has formed key discipline of municipal level, three key disciplines of Shanghai Education Committee and seven key disciplines of the former Machinery Ministry.

=== Research ===
USST has a National Key Discipline, a State Key Laboratory of National Engineering Research Center, and a National University Science Park. It also holds a large number of provincial disciplinary R & D platforms (base). The university has many research centers, such as "Economic Management Experiment Center", "Modern Publishing and Printing Center" and "Energy and Power Engineering Experiment Center" and three National Experimental Teaching Demonstration Center. In addition, USST also owns a large number of undergraduate talent training platforms (bases), including state-level university student innovation base, national professional and technical personnel continuing education base and experimental teaching demonstration center in Shanghai.

The university's three major research disciplines, namely, Power engineering and thermal physics, optical engineering, and management science and engineering have been consistently ranked among the best in China. With demand for engineering education in today's social and economic development, the university actively cultivate the construction of new cross-disciplinary subjects, for instance the university has further enhanced and developed areas such as the advanced manufacturing and high-end equipment and technology, biomedical engineering, manufacturing and new optoelectronic devices and electrical test control technology, micro-nano frontier materials, energy saving and environmental protection technology.

USST has also implemented strategies to enhance the competitiveness of science and technology, and actively carried out basic research, strengthened applied research. The university has conducted or been involved in a number of national key projects and provincial scientific research projects, such as National High-tech R&D Program of China (863 Program) and National Program on Key Basic Research Project of China (973 Program). In recent years, USST has won 1 Second Prize for State Science and Technology Progress Award, 17 provincial science and technology awards, and 220 major projects have been funded by National Natural Science Foundation of China, National Social Science Foundation of China and the National Major Project of Scientific Instruments. The academics in USST have published 4 papers in "Nature" journals, and gained more than 400 authorized patents.

In 2011, the USST National Science Park was ranked 6th in the nation and was rated as Class A (Excellent). In 2012, National Technology Transfer Demonstration Evaluation also gave USST's Technology Transfer Center an excellent rating and the center was ranked 7th place in the country.

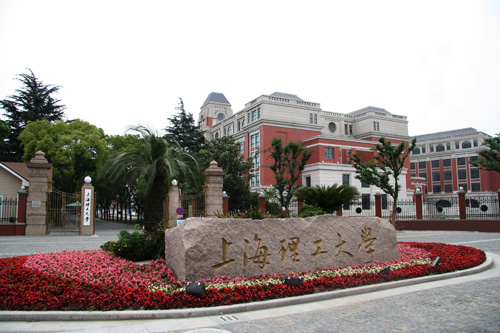
Main Gate USST

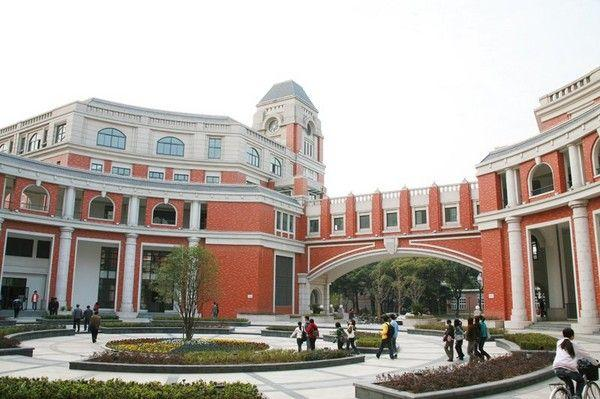
Main Building USST

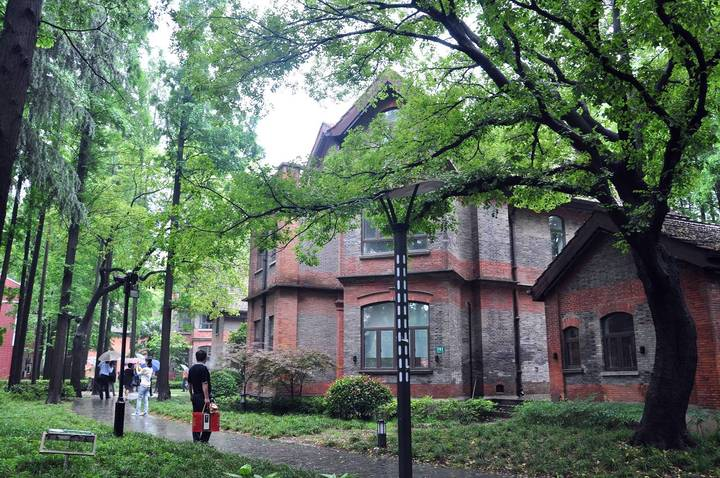
Campus View

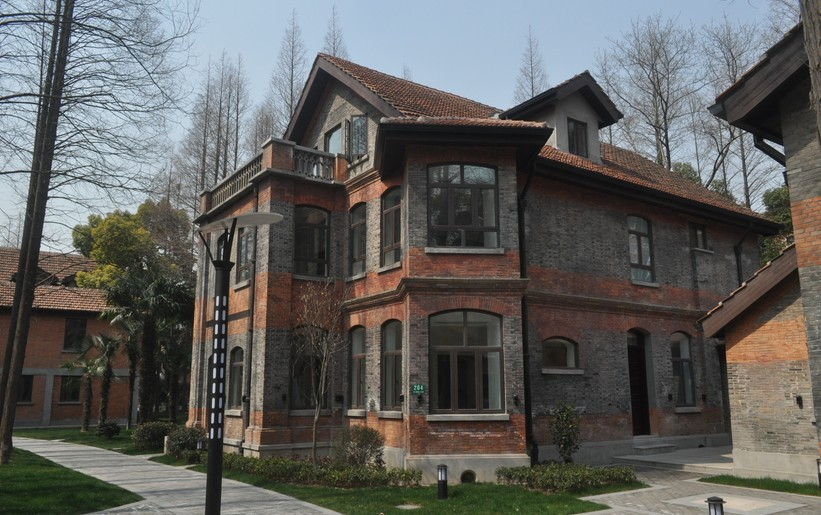
USST Campus

=== Faculty ===
The total number of its full-time teaching staff is 1098, of which 415 have senior technical and professional titles. There are 111 professors and 282 associate professors, including 50 Ph.D. advisors and 280 master advisors. Since 2004, its annual publication of academic papers and books is 1,041. Twenty one of its teachers won the prizes of provincial/ministerial level.

== Campus ==
The main campus of USST is located in the Northeast of Downtown Shanghai next to Huangpu River. The university is adjacent to the Fuxing Island and Gongqing Forest Park, surrounded by green trees and red shining walls. Currently, USST has the largest number of historical buildings of any universities in Shanghai. The University Campus was first built between 1900s to 1940s and is now listed as "Heritage Architecture" by Shanghai Municipal Government. There are 31 single buildings (one on Fuxing Road Campus) included in the list of outstanding historical buildings in Shanghai. 10 buildings on campus were included in cultural relics protection list by Yangpu District Government. The historical buildings are mostly late Romanesque style and simplified Gothic Revival style with masonry structure.

University of Shanghai for Science and Technology has six campuses, including: Jungong Road Campus (Main Campus), Jungong Road South Campus (formerly Shanghai Ocean University campus), Jungong Road No. 1100 (Shenjiang Foundation Institute campus), Nanhui campus (Shanghai Publishing and Printing Higher College, USST), Yingkou Road Campus (Shanghai Medical Instrumentation College, USST) and Fuxing Road campus (The Sino-British College, USST).

== School and Colleges ==
USST now has 18 colleges or schools, one teaching faculties; among them, there are 30 research institutes, 12 research centres and 3 research associations. Major Colleges or Schools include:

=== Schools and Colleges ===
- School of Energy and Power Engineering
- College of Foreign Languages
- College of Science
- College of Communication and Art Design
- College of Basic Science
- School of Social Science
- School of Engineering and Technology
- School of Optical-Electrical and Computer Engineering
- School of Environment and Architecture
- School of Materials Science and Engineering
- School of Music
- School of Medical Instrument and Food Engineering
- School of Mechanical Engineering
- Business School
- Shanghai Publishing and Printing College
- Institute of Photonic Chip

=== International University Colleges ===
- Sino-British College
- Shanghai – Hamburg College
- Shanghai College of International Education, USST

== Ranking ==
University rankings

Global – Overall
- ARWU World: 301-400 (2024)
- USNWR Global: 758 (2024-2025)

Regional – Overall
- QS Asia: 351-400 (2020)
- USNWR Asia: 225 (2024-2025)

National – Overall
- BCUR National: 89 (2020)
- CUAA National: 79 (2020)

USST has been consistently ranked among the top 10 out of 63 universities or Colleges in Shanghai (2016), top 1% nationally (2015) and top 40 universities with core strength in scientific and technological research nationwide (2016).

The 2020 Best Chinese University Ranking published by Shanghai Ranking placed USST the 89th in the country, 9th in Shanghai. In the recent Wu Shulian Chinese university ranking (Wu Shulian 2019), USST is ranked 75th overall in the country and 7th in Shanghai. CUAA Chinese university ranking 2020, one of the most recognised and foremost domestic rankings in China, placed USST 79th in the country and 9th in Shanghai.

According to China Discipline Ranking (CDR) by the Chinese Ministry of Education (MOE) in 2012 (the only national university ranking approved by MOE), USST's Optical engineering was ranked 10th, Power engineering and Engineering thermophysics was ranked 13th, Biomedical engineering was ranked 16th, Food Science and Engineering was ranked 25th and management science and Engineering was ranked 28th nationally. In CDR, USST's Humanities and Social Science disciplines were also highly ranked, for instance, Communication Studies were ranked 23rd, Public Management was ranked 29th, Foreign Languages and Literatures (including Foreign Linguistics) were ranked 40th, applied economics was ranked 45th in the country.

The 2023 Academic Ranking of World Universities (ARWU) or Shanghai Ranking's Global Ranking ranked USST 401–500 in the world. The ARWU Academic Subjects Ranking (2018) placed USST's Mechanical Engineering 201-300th and Electrical & Electronic Engineering, Chemical Engineering and Energy Science & Engineering 301-400th in the world,

The U.S. News & World Report Best Global University Ranking (2020) ranked USST 225th among Best Global Universities in Asia USNews ranking, 87th among Best Global Universities in China. In the USNews subject ranking (2020), USST is ranked 424th in Engineering, 313th in Materials Science, 582nd in Chemistry and 629th in Chemistry globally. USNews (2017) also ranked USST's materials science 347th in the world, 8th in China. QS World University Rankings ranked USST #351-400 among the top 500 Asian Universities in 2020.

The Business School of USST has received accreditation by the Association to Advance Collegiate Schools of Business (AACSB). It is one of the only 20 business schools in China to become a member of AACSB.

== Global Partnerships ==
USST has established inter-university relationships with over 110 universities in more than 20 countries, including Australia, Germany, America, Canada, Japan, Switzerland, Russia and Hong Kong, China.

=== International Cooperation ===
==== Sino-British College ====
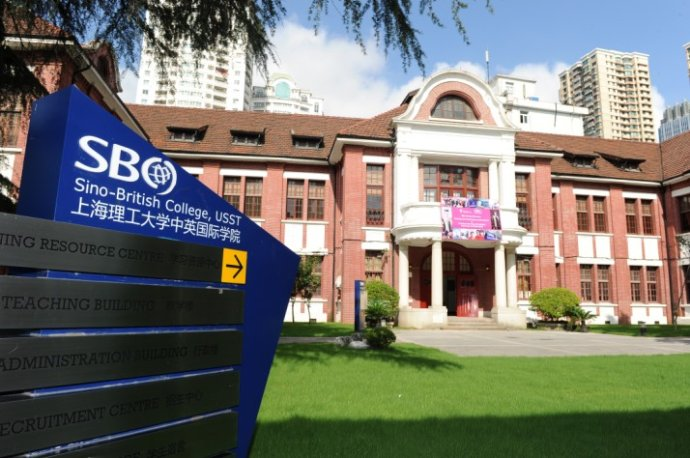
Sino-British College USST

USST's most successful international cooperation is the Sino-British College, located in central Shanghai at USST's Fuxing Road Campus. The Sino-British College (SBC) is an international university college, jointly established by USST and 9 British universities:

- The University of Bradford
- The University of Huddersfield
- The University of Leeds
- Leeds Metropolitan University
- Liverpool John Moores University
- Manchester Metropolitan University
- The University of Salford
- The University of Sheffield
- Sheffield Hallam University.

SBC became a fully licensed university college on 1 September 2006. It is the only Shanghai-based higher education institution to be awarded a licence by the Chinese Ministry of Education to offer full degree programmes with multiple overseas universities (the so-called "1 to N Model"), either taught entirely at the Shanghai campus, or with a period of study abroad. Graduates are awarded degrees from one of the partner British institutions.

==== USST Shanghai-Hamburg College ====
In September 1998, Shanghai-Hamburg College (also known as Sino-German College) was established. This international cooperation has been listed as one of Shanghai-Hamburg Sister Cities cultural exchange programs. The joint educational program is to introduce a German engineer (FH) training mode and make a full use of German teachers and other teaching resources. The purpose is to train talents for the needs of rapid development of Sino-German modern industries, and particularly train personnel for the needs of German Multinational Companies in China. Students graduated from Shanghai-Hamburg College are expected to become internationalized and application-oriented professionals who not only understand German engineering and technology, but are also capable of dealing with cross-cultural communications.

USST Shanghai- Hamburg College now has three undergraduate programs: electrical engineering and automation, machinery manufacturing and automation, and international economics and trade. All the students are enrolled in a professional full-time and four-year bachelor's degree. The first year contains mainly intensive German learning taught by Chinese and German language teachers, and all the students must pass exams for learners of German as a foreign language (Deutsch als Fremdsprache, DaF) developed by the German Goethe-Institut and the TestDaF run by TestDaF-Institut. In their subsequent studies, one third of the professional and technical courses will be taught by Professors of Hamburg University of Applied Sciences in German and with original German materials. With regard to the internship semester, 10% of the outstanding students will be sent to companies in Germany such as Airbus, Lufthansa Technik, Siemens, Philips and so on. Other students will also have the internship opportunities in the German domestic or joint ventures enterprises.

== Gallery ==
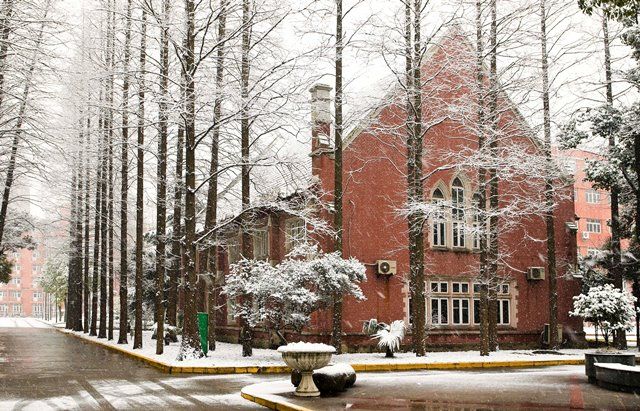
USST in Winter

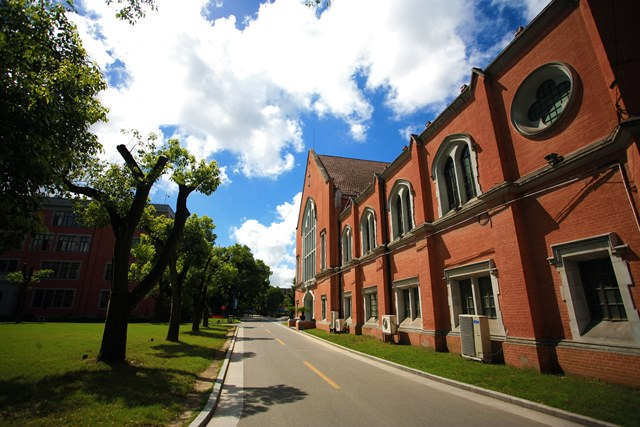
Auditoriumand and White Chapel

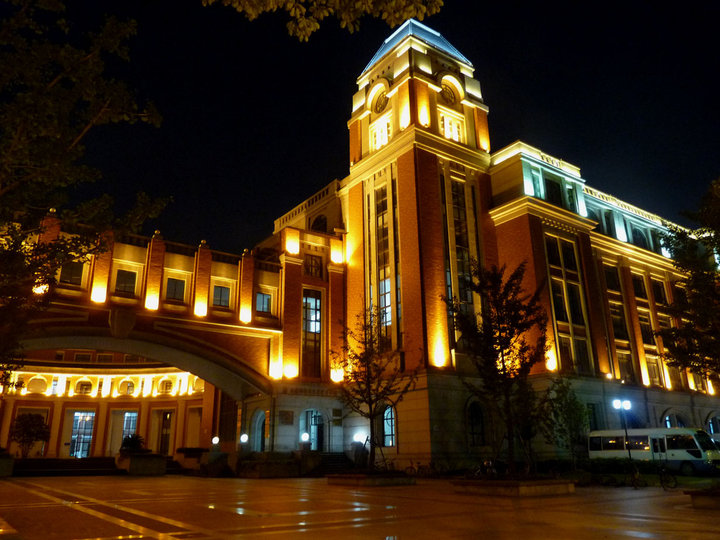
Main Building at night

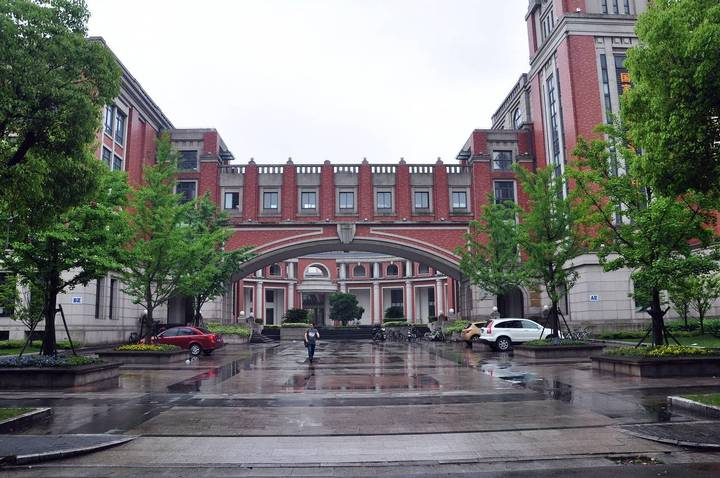
Main Building

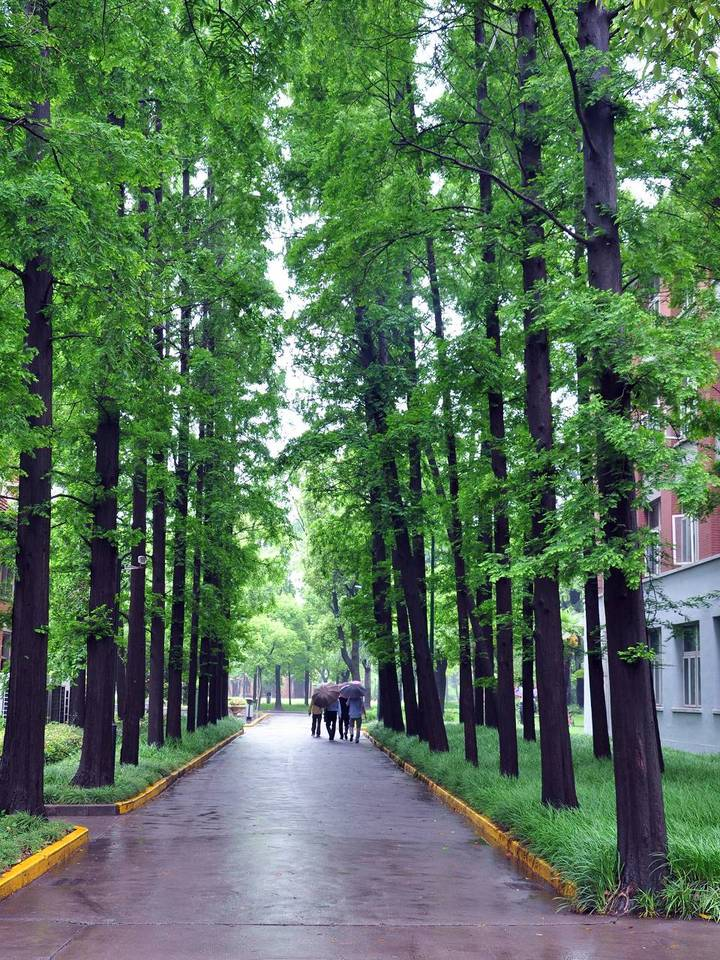
Zhan'en Avenue

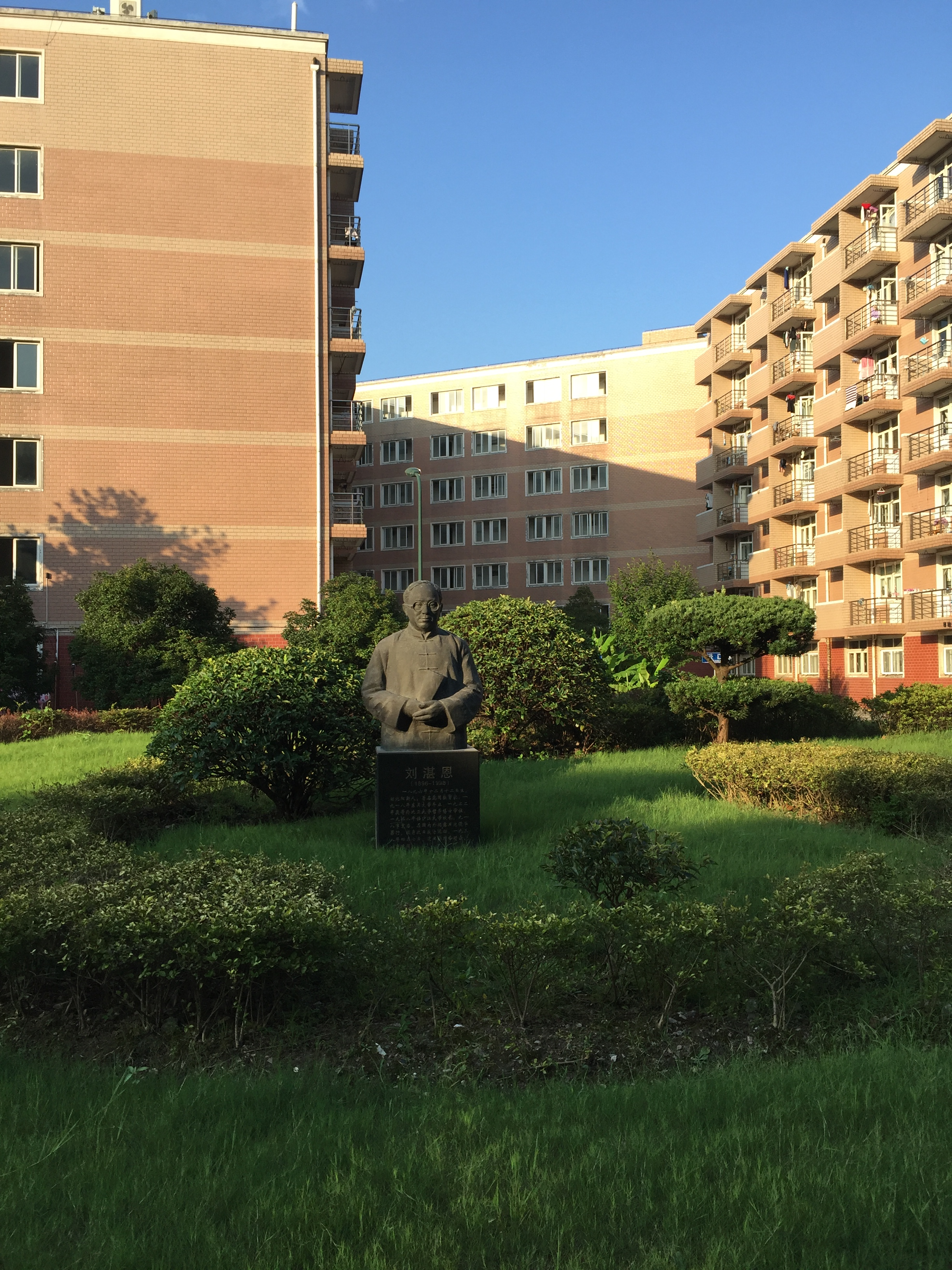
The statue of Dr. Herman C. E. Liu, the first Chinese president

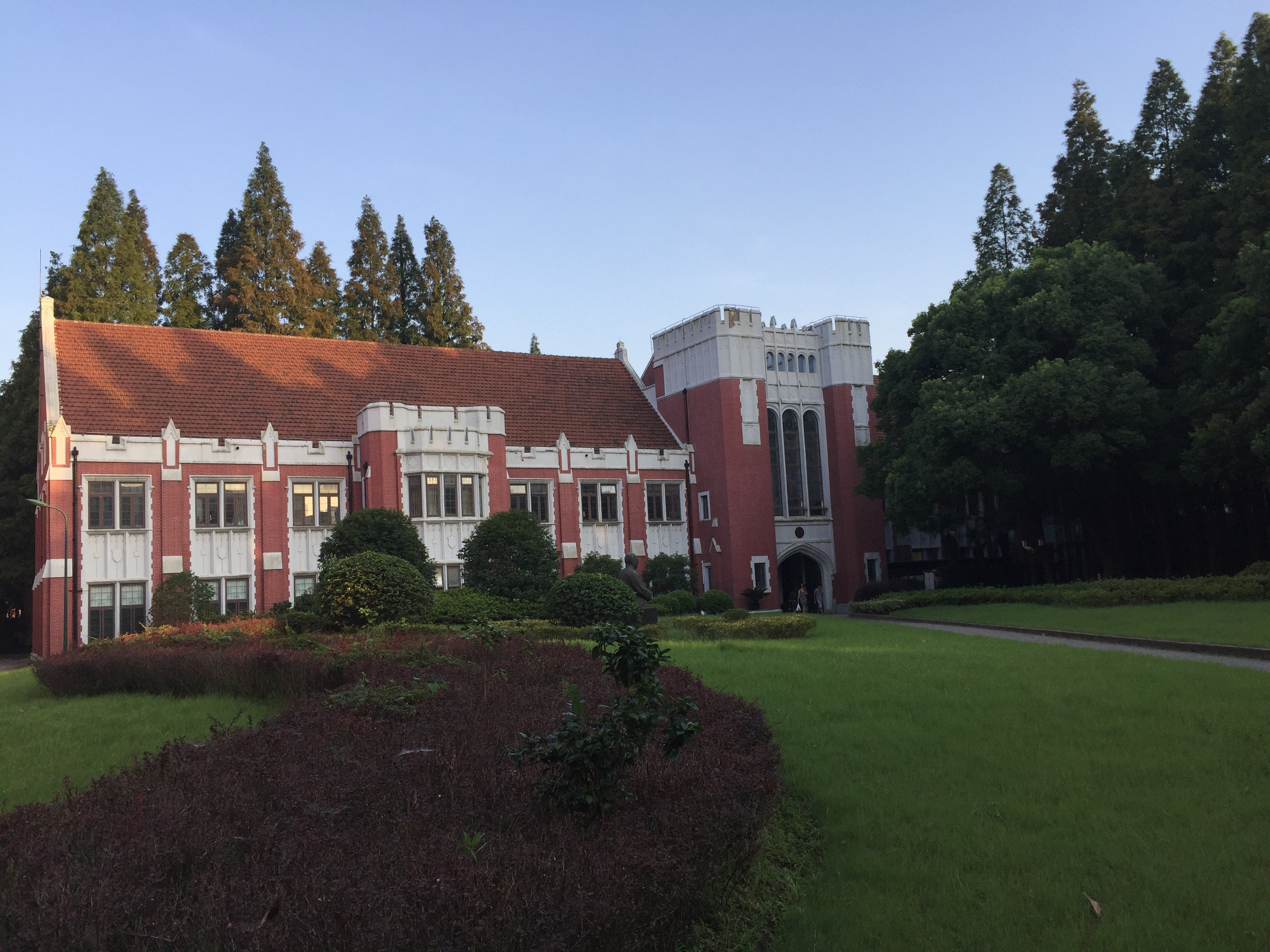
The original library, built in 1928, extended in 1948, now Public Service Center

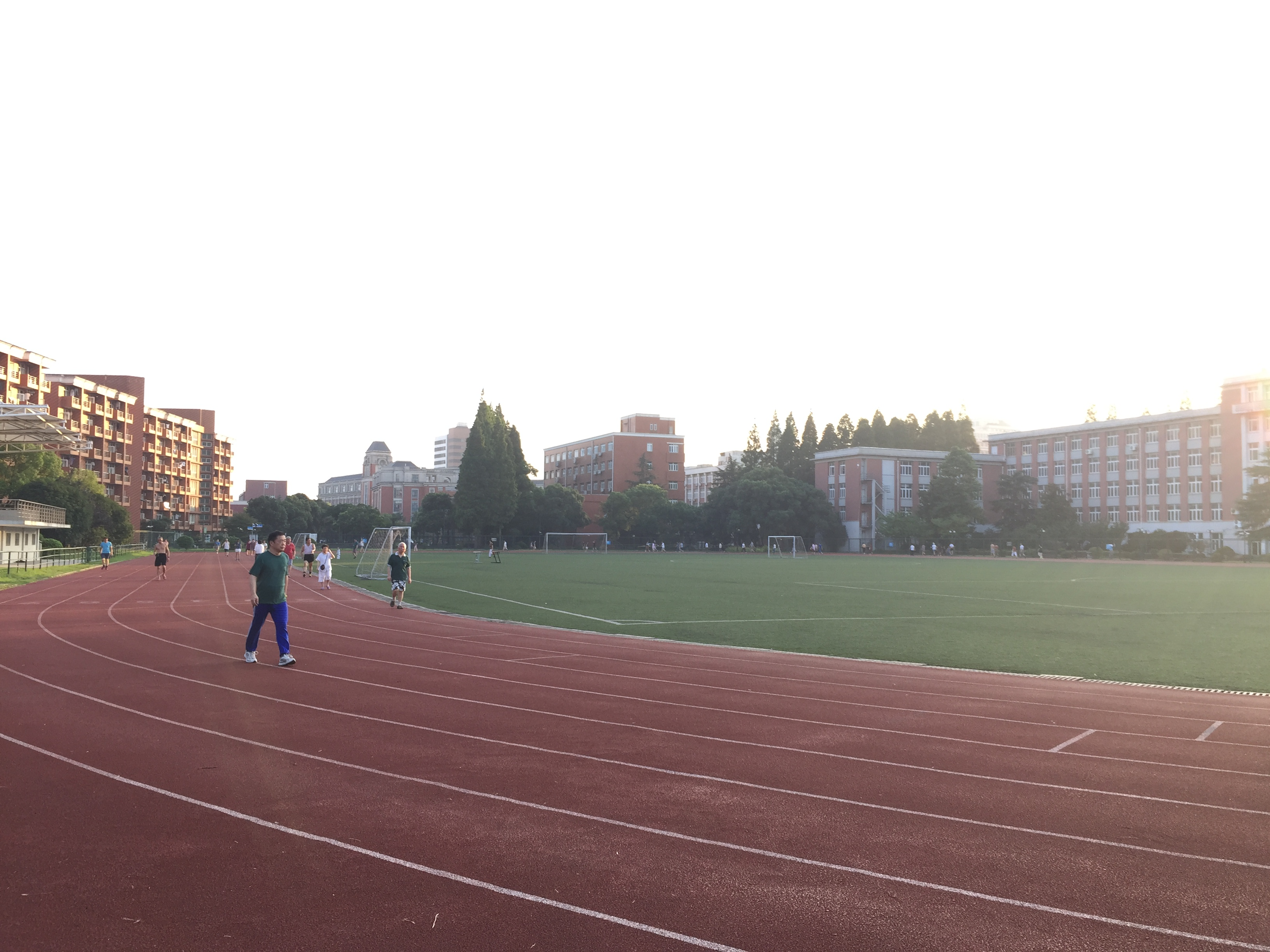
Playground in the North Campus

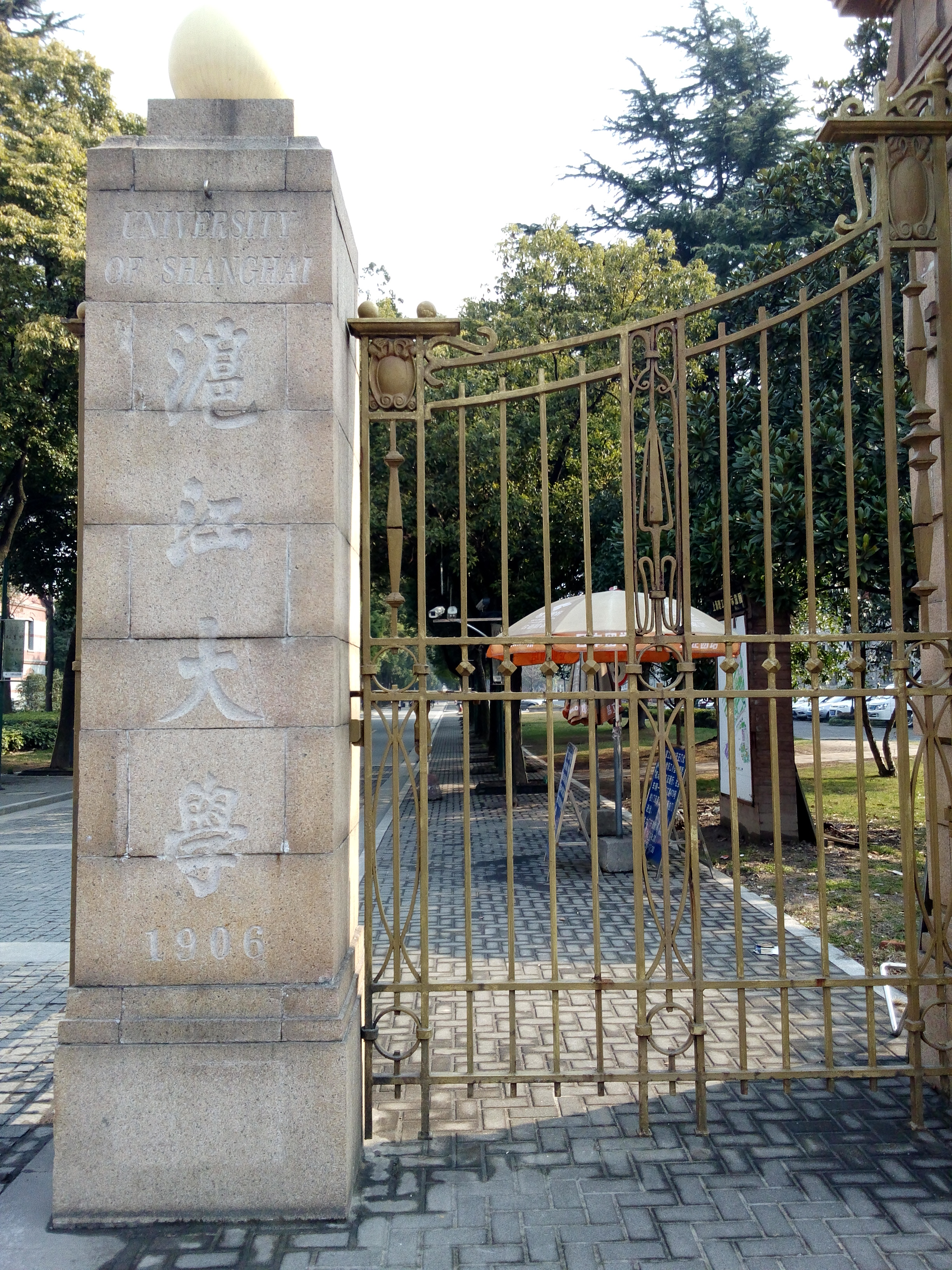
door sign indicates the then University of Shanghai name

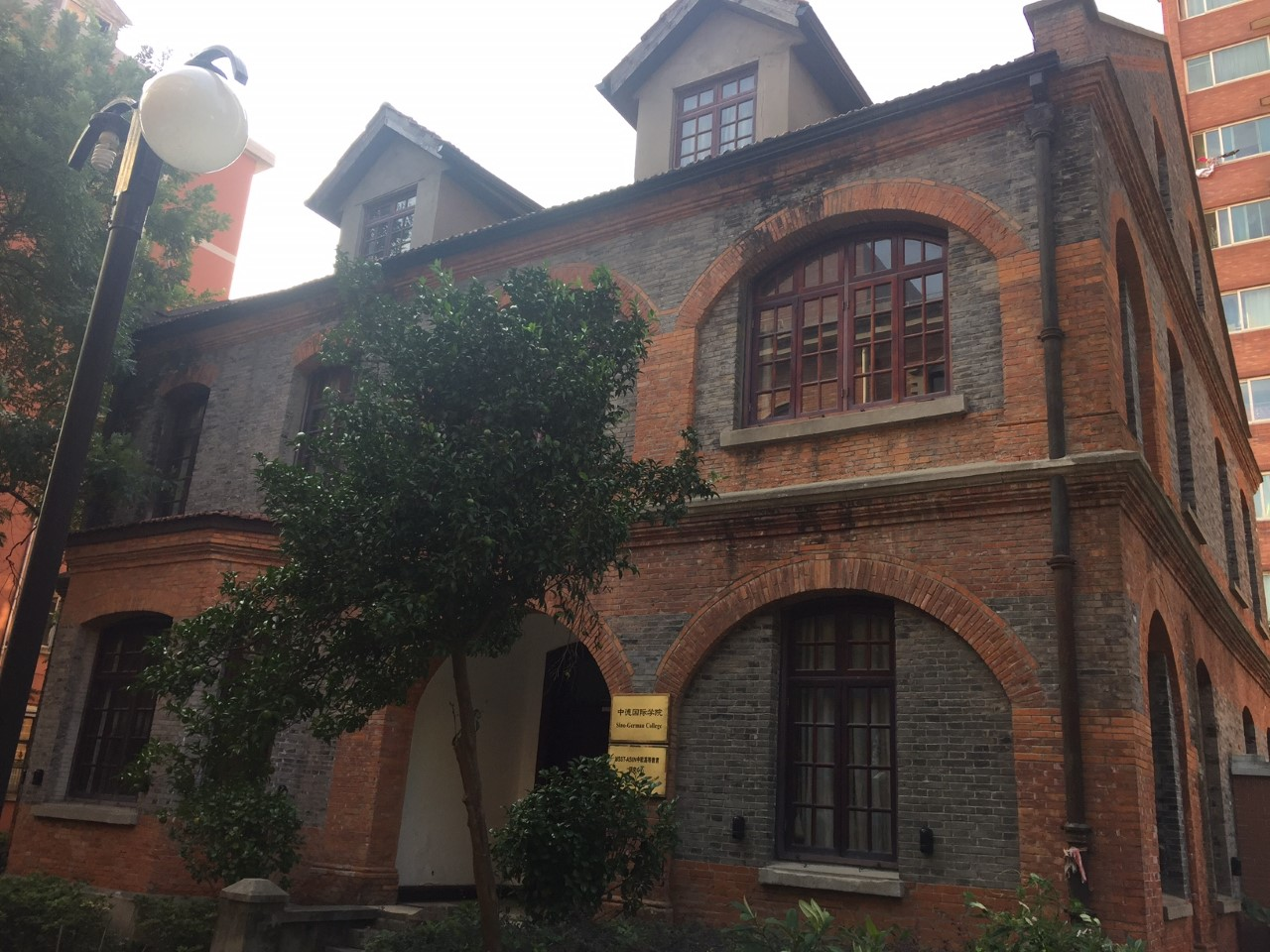
Sino-German College

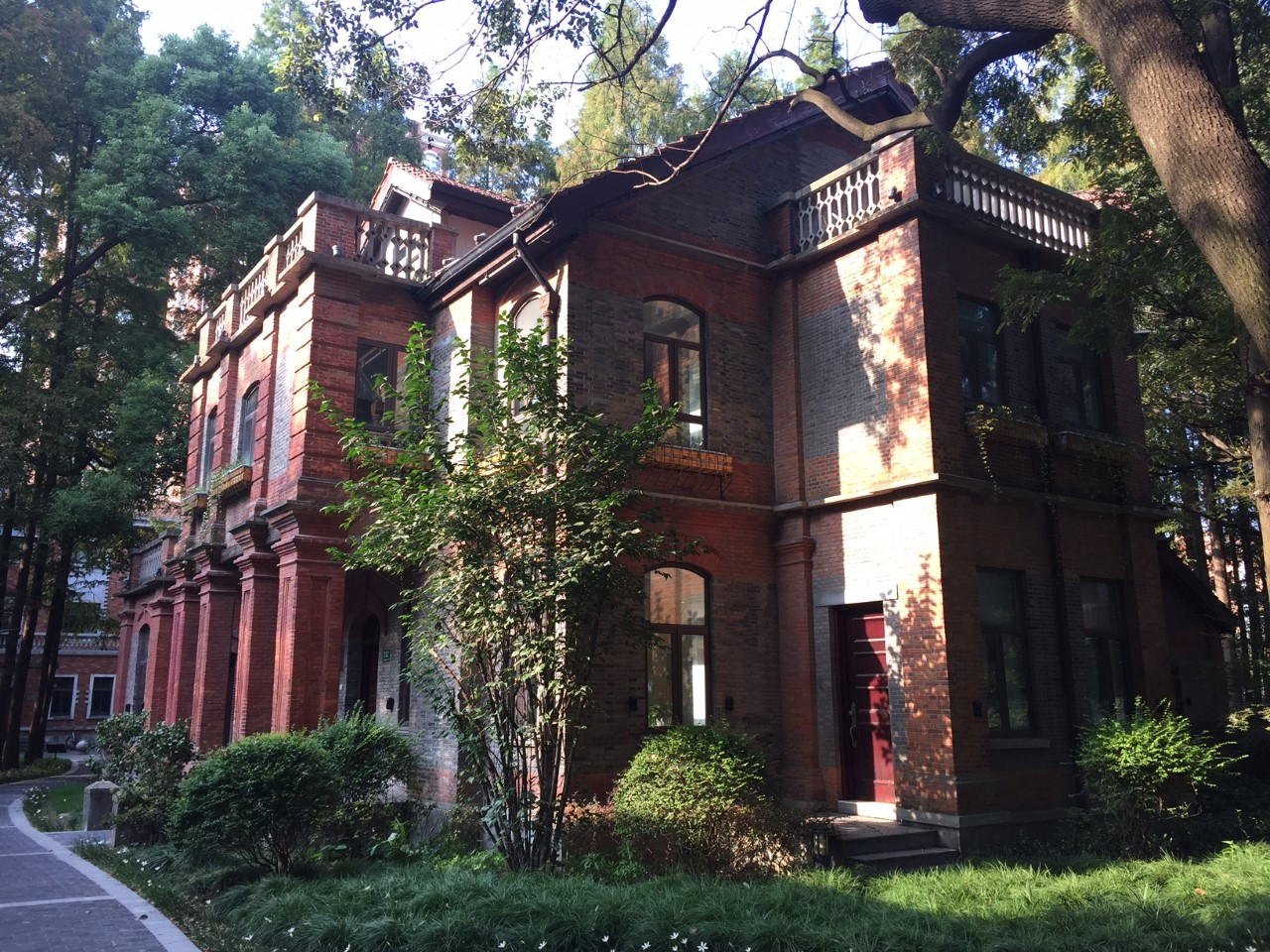
American Culture centre, USST

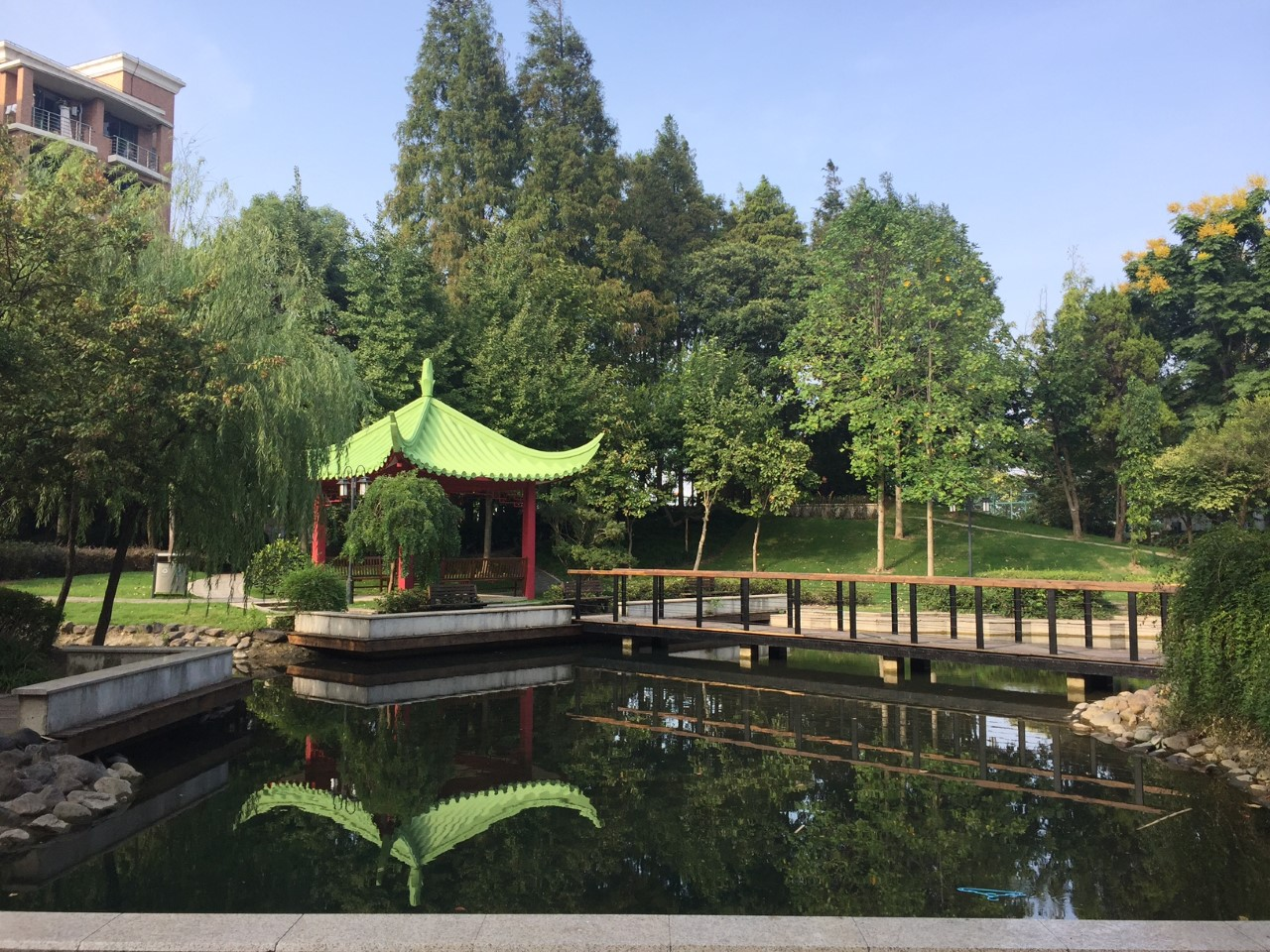
USST Campus Park

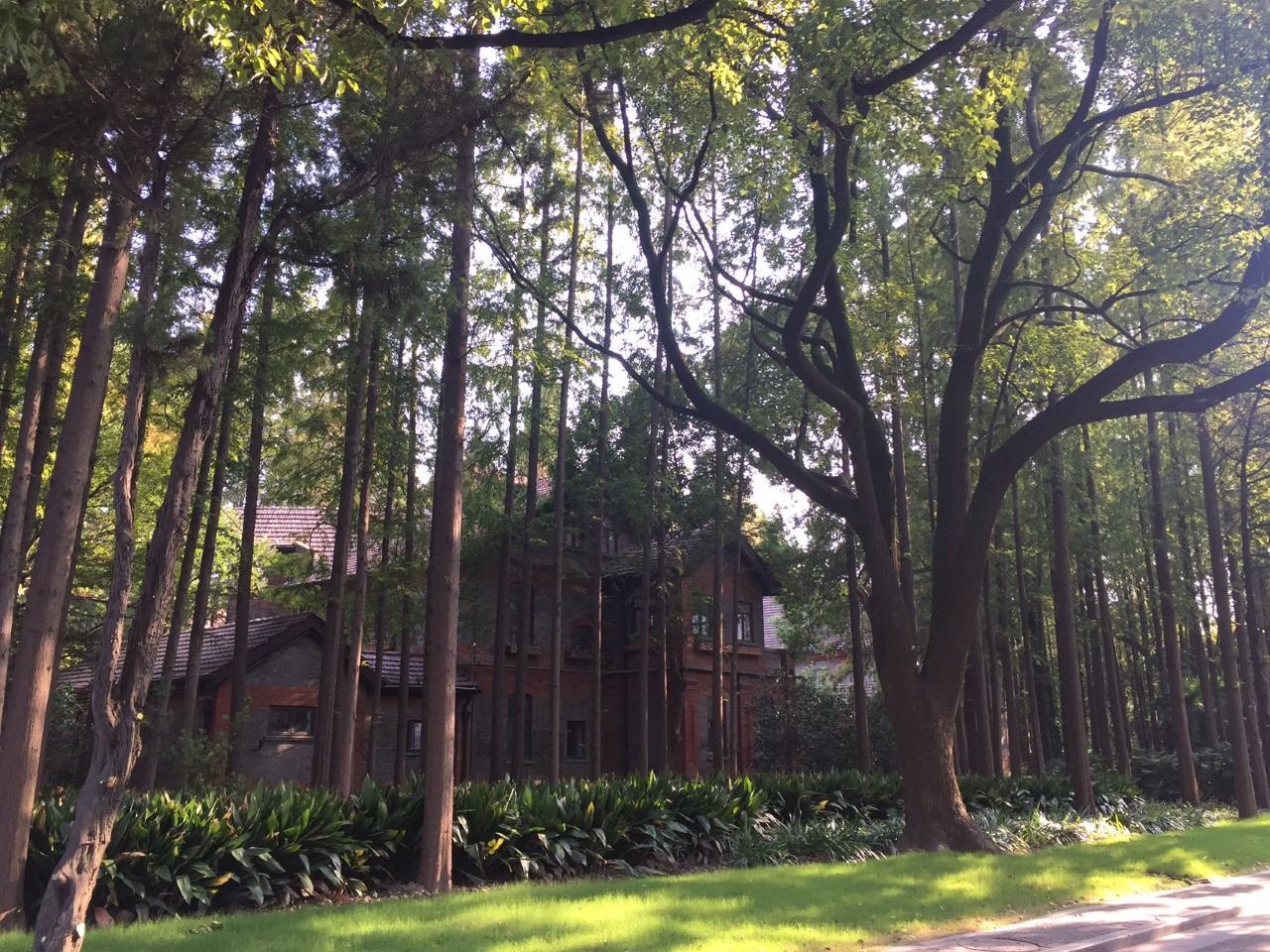
Shanghai College of International Education (SCIE), USST

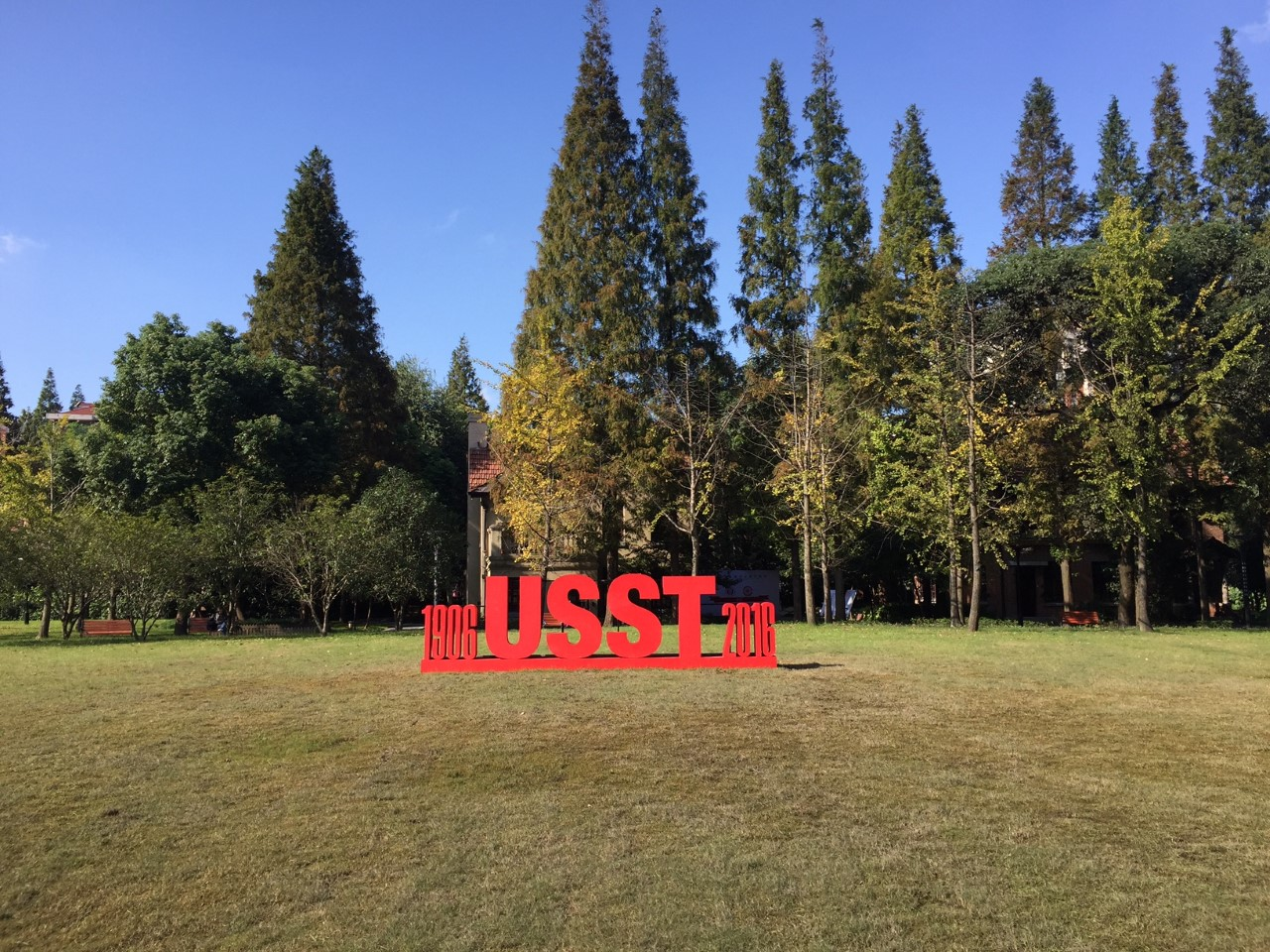
Celebration of 110th anniversary

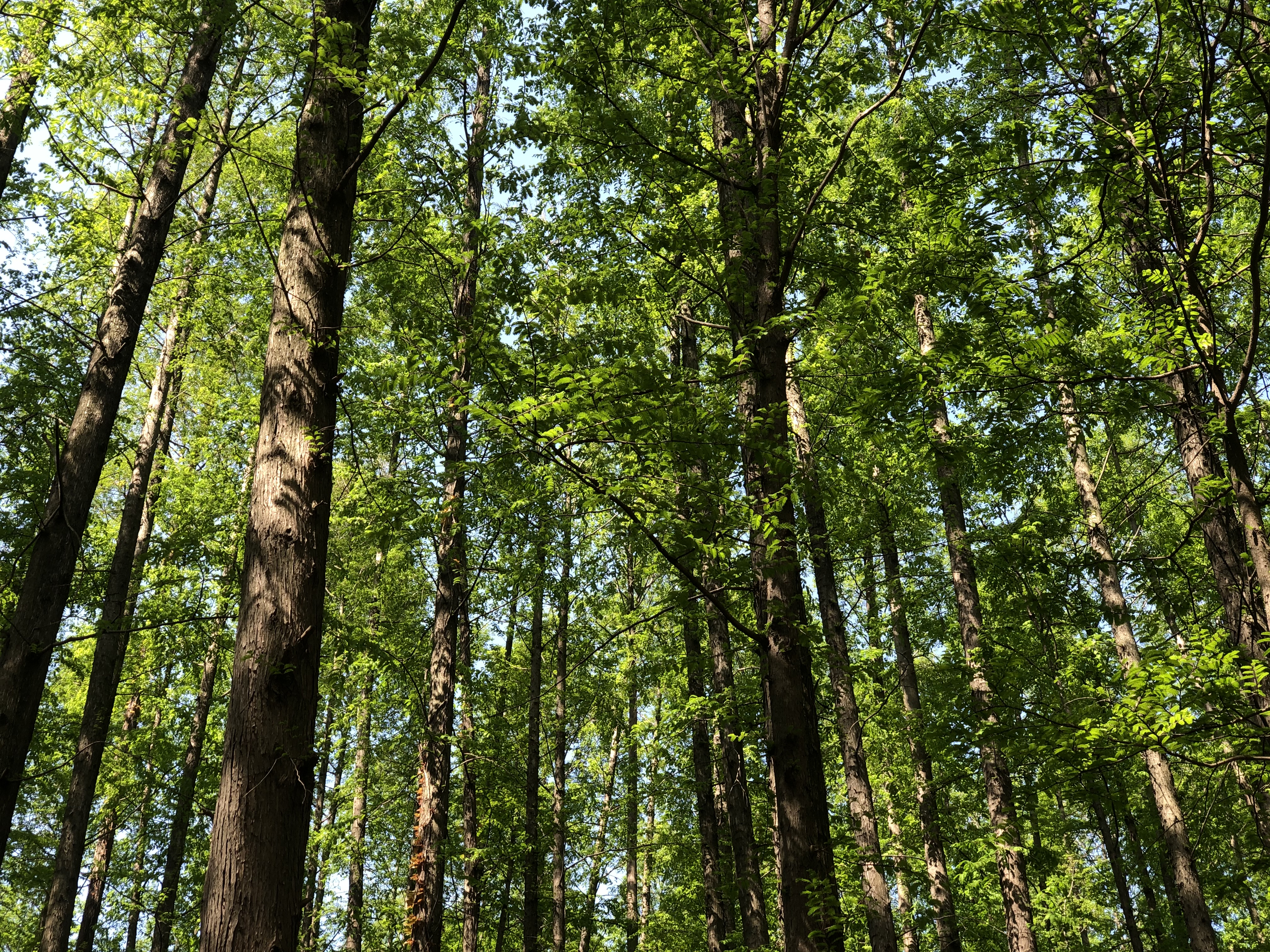
Campus landscaping

== Notable alumni ==
=== Arts and literature ===
- Xu Zhimo (徐志摩): One of the most renowned romantic poets of 20th-century Chinese literature.
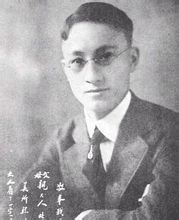
  Xu Zhimo 徐志摩

=== Government and politics ===
- Peggy Lam Pei Yu-dja (林贝聿嘉): GBS, OBE, a Hong Kong politician and activist, the CEO of the Family Planning Association of Hong Kong and the cousin of world-renowned architect I. M. Pei.
- Li Gongpu (李公朴): Social activist, a great patriot and democrat in China's modern history.
- Chu Fu-Sung (朱抚松): Republic of China politician, who served as foreign minister from 19 December 1979, until 22 April 1987.
- Meng Jianzhu (孟建柱): Senior economist, Chinese politician and a member of the Politburo of the Chinese Communist Party. The current secretary of Central Political and Legal Affairs Commission.
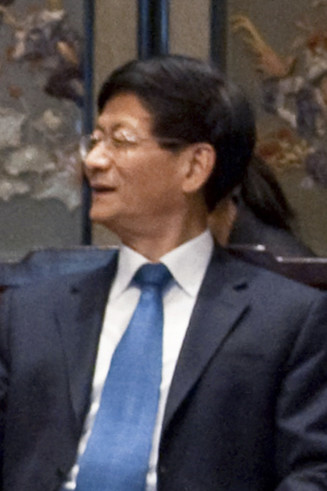
  Meng Jianzhu 孟建柱
- Li Daoyu (李道豫): Diplomat of the People's Republic of China, former PRC's ambassador to the United States.
- Xu Kuangdi (徐匡迪): Politician and scientist, mayor of Shanghai from 1995 to 2001, vice-chairman of the Chinese People's Political Consultative Conference.
- Huang Qifan (黄奇帆): Mayor of Chongqing, Central Committee of the Chinese Communist Party.
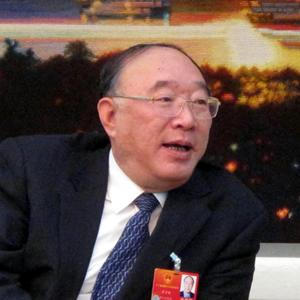
  Huang Qifan 黄奇帆

=== Science and technology ===
- Min Naiben (闵乃本): Crystal physicist, academician of Chinese Academy of Sciences, the winner of National Natural Science Award.

=== Business and industry ===
- Arnold Fu (伏彩瑞): Graduate from the Department of English, USST, founder and CEO of Hujiang.com (沪江网)

=== Entertainment ===
- Dai Jun (戴军): Chinese singer, TV host and actor.
