= Sino-British College =

Coordinates: 31.212°N 121.460°E

- Type: Public
- Established: 1 September 2006
- Principal: Vacant
- Academic staff: 80
- Students: 1450
- Location: Shanghai, China
- Campus: Urban
- Website: www.sbcen.usst.edu.cn/main.htm

The Sino-British College (SBC) is an international university college delivering British degrees and qualifications in Shanghai, China, jointly established by the University of Shanghai for Science and Technology (USST), and nine British universities of NCUK.

== Establishment ==
Formally established from 1 September 2006 by USST and nine founding universities of UK Charity, Northern Consortium (owner of subsidiary company, the USST/SBC partner, NCUK Ltd): The University of Bradford, The University of Huddersfield, The University of Leeds, Leeds Metropolitan University, Liverpool John Moores University, Manchester Metropolitan University, The University of Salford, The University of Sheffield, and Sheffield Hallam University. SBC holds a licence from the Ministry of Education as an educational joint venture on the "one to many" model, being the only example in the Shanghai region.

== Programmes ==
British degrees from three of the partner universities are delivered at the college, with students taught and assessed, in English, by SBC and the partner universities' academic staff. Eligible students may be enrolled on dual degrees programmes, being awarded bachelor's degrees from both the British partner and USST on successful completion of a 4-year programme. NCUK foundation qualifications are also offered, taught and assessed at the college by SBC academic staff.

== History ==
SBC occupies an historic educational site on the Fuxing Road campus of USST in the former French concession at the heart of the city of Shanghai. Originally established as a German medical school in 1907, later including engineering, the site was transferred to the control of the Chinese and French governments by the Treaty of Versailles becoming a joint institute for business education. After 1945, the joint institute was merged with other colleges with the site becoming a mechanics institute.

== Organisation ==
The college is organised into 3 schools, School of Business and Management, School of Engineering and Computing and School of Languages, Education and Cultures

== Accreditation ==
SBC is a Member of AACSB. SBC is a communicating signatory of the United Nations Global Compact's Principles for Responsible Management Education (PRME). The LJMU engineering degree programmes delivered at SBC are accredited, in their own right, by the IET.
