= TestDaF =

German language proficiency test

The TestDaF, formally Test Deutsch als Fremdsprache ("Test of German as a foreign language"), is a standardised language test of German proficiency for non-native German speakers. It aims at people who would like to study at, or academics and scientists who want to work in, German universities. The test is run by the TestDaF-Institut.

The test can be taken in 95 countries. The test covers listening comprehension, reading comprehension, writing and speaking, and is recognised by German universities as proof of prospective students' ability.

The grades of candidates are marked in terms of three levels, TDN 3 — 5, which correspond roughly to the Common European Framework of Reference for Languages levels B2–C1.

The certificate is valid for an unlimited period of time.

== History ==
A standardised language examination for foreign students enrolling in German universities was first proposed in 1996 during the Conference of the Cultural Minister (Kultusministerkonferenz).

In early 1998, the financial support from Foreign Office (Auswärtigen Amt) and the Federal Ministry of Education and Research (Bundesministerium für Bildung und Forschung) became available and German Academic Exchange Service (DAAD) was commissioned to hold a bidding for the project to develop a central language examination. In the same year, the contract was awarded to a consortium composed of the University of Hagen, the Department of Linguistic Research of Ruhr-University Bochum, Goethe-Institut and the Carl Duisberg Centre in Cologne.

The project began on 1 August 1998. Before 31 July 2000 three modal tests had been drafted and were tested worldwide. The performance description, marking criteria and evaluation procedures were worked out and an item bank for prototype, a database of participants and a test database were all set up.

On 26 April 2001, the TestDaF was taken for the first time.

== Supporting organisations ==
The tasks of the TestDaF have been developed by the TestDaF-Institut, which is an institution run by the Society for Academic Study Preparation and Test Development (Gesellschaft für Akademische Studienvorbereitung und Testentwicklung e.V.). It is also supported by, among others, the German Rectors’ Conference (Hochschulrektorenkonferenz), German Academic Exchange Service and the Goethe-Institut.

== Target group ==
The primary target group of the TestDaf examination is the student applicants who have obtained their qualification in foreign countries but want to continue their study in Germany. In accordance to the Law of Higher Education (Landeshochschulgesetz), they need a proof of their proficiency in German in order to fulfil the language requirement, and thus TestDaF would be a useful measure.

There are also other target groups who would be interested to take the exam:

- Students who need to prove their German proficiency in their home countries.
- Students who have studied in Germany as an exchange student, and subsequently want to have their German proficiency certified.
- Scholars who have an academic visit to a German university and would like to examine his competence in German.
- Persons who need to prove their competence in German for academic works.

As TestDaf does not offer examinations in different levels, the question paper for all candidates are the same. Therefore, TestDaF is only suitable for advanced learners but not beginners.

== Examination ==
All the topics and tasks in the test are set within the general context of higher education. They are intended for candidates of all disciplines and academic backgrounds.

The examination consists of 4 parts:

Sub-test	Tasks	Description	Duration
Reading Comprehension	Reading 3 texts and answering 30 questions	Candidates need to demonstrate their ability to understand written texts related to higher education. They have to answer a set of questions which require comprehension of context and detail as well as implicit information. There are three texts at different levels of difficulty. The types of text and task also vary. For example, there could be short texts on everyday life at university, newspaper, magazine articles and articles from academic journals.	60 minutes
Listening Comprehension	Listening to 3 audio-texts and answering 25 questions	Candidates need to illustrate their ability of listening comprehension by understanding spoken texts related to higher education. There are three listening texts at different levels of difficulty: a dialogue typical of everyday life at university, a radio interview with three or four speakers, and a short lecture or an interview with an expert. The types of text and tasks also vary. Understanding of context and detail as well as implicit information are required.	Approximately 40 minutes
Written Production	Completing 1 writing task	Candidates' writing ability is tested by writing a well-structured text about a specific topic. They need to describe statistical data, which is presented in a graph or a table, in the first part of his text, and then state their opinion on a specific question for discussion related to the above-described data.	60 minutes
Oral Production	Completing 7 speaking tasks	Candidates need to prove their ability to speak German in different situations related to the field of higher education. This part comprises seven tasks at variable levels of difficulty and the candidates are asked to respond in various situations in university, like discussing with fellow students, describing a diagram during a discussion section, stating your opinion on a particular topic, or forming hypotheses.	Approximately 30 minutes

The examination as a whole lasts for 3 hours 10 minutes, not including the breaks. The first three parts of the exam are tested in a classroom context, while the oral examination is done by speaking to a computer.

== Grading ==
The result of TestDaf is not marked as simply "pass" or "fail". Since the question papers are the same for candidates, and the test needs to separate the examinees into different levels, the results of the examinees are given in three different levels:

- TestDaF-Niveaustufe 3 (TDN 3)
- TestDaF-Niveaustufe 4 (TDN 4)
- TestDaF-Niveaustufe 5 (TDN 5)

If the candidate does not reach the lowest level, "unter TDN 3" (lower than TDN 3) is printed on the certificate.

The test consists of four parts. Each part is separately graded and the sub-grades are also shown on the certificate. Some universities demand their applicants to get a certain grade in all parts of the exam (the grade is depended on the applied programme and subject), but some count the marks just in total. When a candidate fails to reach the required grade, they can re-take the exam.

The exam is marked centrally by well-trained markers.

The three TestDaF levels are designed in accordance with the Common European Framework of Reference for Languages (CEFR) as well as the performance descriptions set by the Association of Language Testers in Europe (ALTE). TDN 3 and the lower half of TDN 4 correspond to the B2 level in CEFR, and the upper half of TDN 4 and TDN 5 correspond to the C1 level.

Performance description of various levels
Sub-test	TDN 3	TDN 4	TDN 5
Reading Comprehension	The candidate can understand the overall meaning and the most important details of written texts relevant to common study-related situations; he can also partly understand written texts on general academic topics.	The candidate can understand the overall meaning and specific details of written texts relevant to common study-related situations and on general academic topics that are mainly written in non-specialised language.	The candidate can understand the overall meaning and specific details of linguistically and structurally complex written texts relevant to common study-related situations and on general academic topics. He can also extract implicit information from them.
Listening Comprehension	The candidate can understand the overall meaning and the most important details of spoken texts relevant to common study-related situations; he/she can also partly understand spoken texts on general academic topics.	The candidate can understand the main ideas of spoken texts relevant to common study-related situations and on general academic topics that contain mainly non-specialised language.	The candidate can understand the overall meaning and specific details of linguistically and structurally complex spoken texts relevant to common study-related situations and on general academic topics.
Writing	The candidate can write generally comprehensible and structured texts in common study-related situations (e. g. a report for the grant awarding body); can write simply structured texts in a general academic context (e. g. course notes, synopsis of a lecture); linguistic and structural deficiencies may impair understanding.	The candidate can write generally structured and cohesive texts in a style generally appropriate to the context in common study-related situations (e. g. a report for the grant awarding body) and in a general academic context (e. g. course notes, synopsis of a lecture); linguistic deficiencies do not impair understanding.	The candidate can write well-structured and cohesive texts in a style appropriate to the context using a differentiated vocabulary in common study-related situations (e. g. a report for the grant awarding body) and in a general academic context (e. g. course notes, synopsis of a lecture).
Speaking	The candidate can communicate in common study-related situations (e.g. university registration, course enrolment), linguistic deficiencies may, however, slow down understanding; in a general academic context (e. g. current affairs discussions) the communicative intention is only partly realised.	The candidate can communicate in a style generally appropriate to the context in common study-related situations (e. g. university registration, course enrolment) and in a general academic context (e. g. current affairs discussions); linguistic deficiencies do not impair communication.	The candidate can communicate clearly in a style appropriate to the context using a differentiated vocabulary in common study-related situations (e. g. university registration, course enrolment) and in a general academic context (e. g. current affairs discussions).

== Certificate ==
Within six weeks the candidates receive a certificate issued by the Test Centre. The certificate shows the grades of all parts of the examination and the detailed description of the reached level can be read at the back side of the certificate. If the candidate has not reached the lowest level, i.e. TDN 3, then "unter TDN 3" (lower than TDN 3) would be shown on the certificate. The certificate is valid for an unlimited period of time.

== University enrollment ==
In general students must get TDN 4 in all parts of the examinations in order to be admitted into universities in Germany. But since every university in Germany has its own admissions policy, it is at the discretion of individual universities to admit applicants whose scores are below TDN 4 to their courses of study, depending on factors such as the course subject, type of degree awarded and course duration.

If the candidate gets a score of TDN 5, it shows that they have a very good knowledge of German, above that required at the beginning of their studies.

== CEFR Equivalency ==
Empirical studies have shown that the TDN grades can be converted to the scale of the Common European Framework of Reference for Languages as follows:

- TDN 3 = CEFR B2.1 - B2.2
- TDN 4 = CEFR B2.2 - C1.1
- TDN 5 = CEFR C1.1 - C1.2

== Test centres ==
There are approximately 450 test centres in 95 countries worldwide, offering the TestDaf exams six times a year. the officially approved test centres, which are managed by TestDaF-Institut, are usually located at German and foreign universities and other higher education institutes, DAAD editorial offices, Goethe-Institut, as well as the Adult high schools (Volkshochschule) and language schools in Germany. The test centres are responsible for:

- Advice and registration for the interested people,
- Organisational preparation and conduct of the examination,
- Offer of preparation course for the exam,
- Issue of the certificates,
- Advertisement of the TestDaf.

== Preparation for TestDaF ==
There are many preparation courses for TestDaF in Germany as well as foreign countries. These courses are offered by official test centres as well as other language schools. Relevant information can be obtained at the official website of TestDaf.

At the website of TestDaF, tips for the examination are available and sample papers can also be downloaded.

Sometimes, new tests of TestDaF need to be tested, and if possible, there are chances that one can register to do the new test under test in order to be familiar with the test format.

Before registering for the exam, it is also possible to do a placement test at the website of TestDaF, so as to check the level of one's language and decide if it is suitable to register for the examination at that time.

The TestDaF-Institut, however, does not release the test to the public, making it very hard to study alone, and most of the time, acquire a preparation course which could get expensive, considering the already high price of the test.

== Advantages and disadvantages of TestDaF ==
TestDaF-Institut claims that there are many advantages for the candidate to decide to sit for the TestDaF:

- All German universities recognise the TestDaF certificate.
- The TestDaF assesses the language skills necessary for study in Germany. The content and tasks of TestDaF are all academic, scientific and study-relevant topics.
- The four language skills are separately assessed and the certificate shows the results of all the sub-tests, giving the candidate an idea of their strengths and weaknesses in each area.
- The TestDaF can be taken in the home country of a candidate and the certificate is sent directly to them. This saves a trip to Germany and enables the candidate to collect all the required documents for the university application before traveling to Germany.
- The candidates can concentrate on specific preparation by working on model tests and samples tests provided by TestDaF-Institut at its website. And the sub-tests are guaranteed to be of same level of difficulty, regardless of the time and place of taking the exam.
- There is a worldwide network of licensed test centres where further information and advice are available. Information can be obtained from DAAD lecturers, Goethe Institutes, language centres and university departments of German studies or German embassies and consulates in the candidates' home country.
- The TestDaF certificate is valid for an unlimited period of time.
- The examination can be re-taken as often as one wishes should the candidate be unsatisfied with their results.

However, there are also disadvantages to the TestDaF, especially when compared with the Deutsche Sprachprüfung für den Hochschulzugang (DSH), which is likewise tailored to the language requirements for entering German universities.

- It typically takes around six weeks for a TestDaf certificate to come through, whereas DSH is much faster.
- The candidates need to pass all parts of the exam in order to fulfil the language requirement. With DSH it is the overall grade that counts, so a weakness in one skill can be compensated in another.
- Unlike most DSH exams, TestDaF has no specific grammar test.
- The fees for TestDaF are usually higher than for DSH.
- The TestDaF oral exam is conducted online, which can feel strange for some candidates and could affect their performance.

== Examination fee ==
The fee of the examination varies according to the level of development of the country.

== Statistics ==
The number of TestDaF candidates increased from 7,498 candidates in 2003 took to 24,261 in 2012. In 2003 there were only 211 test centres but this number had increased to 440 by 2012.

== See also ==
- TestDaF-Institut
- Goethe-Institut
- German Academic Exchange Service
