= TestDaF-Institut =

The TestDaF-Institut is an institute for language testing in Bochum, Germany. It runs the TestDaF.

The institute is part of the Society for Academic Study Preparation and Test Development, Gesellschaft für Akademische Studienvorbereitung und Testentwicklung e. V., based in Bonn, which was founded in 2000 by various German-language institutions including DAAD (German Academic Exchange Service), the Goethe-Institut, the distance learning university in Hagen, and the Carl Duisberg Centre in Cologne. The idea for the society came from the DAAD and the German Rectors' Conference (Hochschulrektorenkonferenz, HRK).

== See also ==
- TestDaF
- Goethe-Institut
- German Academic Exchange Service
