= Elmar Schrüfer =

German physicist

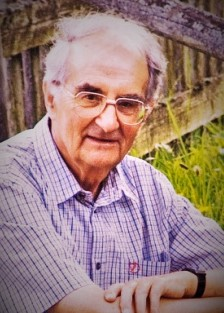
Elmar Schrüfer (2014)

Elmar Schrüfer (23 May 1931 – 22. May 2022) was a German physicist and professor for measurement technology. He was known for his contributions to university education in electrical measurement technology, the related fields of reliability of measurement and automation equipment and signal processing, as well as radiation and its measurement in nuclear power plants. The 13th edition of his university textbook "Elektrische Messtechnik : Messung elektrischer und nichtelektrischer Größen" (Electrical measurement technology: Measurement of electrical and non-electrical quantities) was published in 2022.

== Early life and education ==
Elmar Schrüfer was born in Edelbach in Spessart in 1931 as the eldest of four children. His father was a teacher. Schrüfer attended the Gymnasium in Aschaffenburg until 1950, then studied physics at the Julius-Maximilians-Universität Würzburg. He was awarded his doctorate in 1958 with a thesis on the energy distribution in the spectrum of the X-ray bremsstrahlung of a 35 MeV betatron.

== Industrial activities ==
After completing his PhD, he began working in industry, first at Allgemeine Elektricitätsgesellschaft (AEG), and later at Kraftwerk Union (KWU). His work included radiation measurement technology on research and power reactors, and he eventually published the book Strahlung und Strahlungsmesstechnik in Kernkraftwerken (Radiation and Radiation Measurement Technology in Nuclear Power Plants), which guided the activities of the Technischer Überwachungsvereine (TÜV).

He was later responsible for the design, procurement, installation and commissioning of the entire instrumentation (nuclear and conventional, measurement, and signal processing) of nuclear power plants. One focus of his work was the safety of the plants. By the time he left Kraftwerkunion, Schrüfer had been promoted to a department head.

== Research and teaching ==
While still working in industry, Schrüfer received a teaching assignment from the University of Karlsruhe in the field of reactor instrumentation. Schrüfer was appointed in 1975 as a professor of electrical measurement technology at the Technical University of Munich, and remained in this position until his retirement in 1998. Even after his retirement, he remained active in student exchange activities. Journalist Katarina Bader remarked in 2006:

As soon as one enters the office of Prof. Elmar Schrüfer in the "Technische Universität München" (TUM) one knows: this is not only the working place of a very well respected expert on Metrology but also room of a cosmopolitan in the very best sense of word: Prof. Schrüfer is obviously interested in all kinds of cultures and it is evident that he has friends all over the world. On the walls there are pictures from Kiev, Beijing and Petersburg and on the top of the cupboard there is hardly any free space due to all these beautiful handmade matroshkas, Chinese vases and framed little pictures which are standing up there very accurately lined up.

Cooperation with foreign universities, especially those in Eastern Europe and China, was a particular concern of Schrüfer. In this, he was supported by his wife, Anna. Early on, he made efforts to establish contact with colleagues in the GDR.

Schrüfer was a Consult. Prof. at both Huazhong University of Science and Technology in 1983 and Northwestern Polytechnical University in 1993, and he was a guest professor at Peking University in 1993.

Together with Professors Hans-Rolf Tränkler (Universität der Bundeswehr München) and Friedrich Schneider (TUM), the Stipendienprogramm Ost (Scholarship Program East) was established. As part of this program, students from Eastern European universities were able to spend six months writing their theses in the laboratories of Munich universities. This program was not financed by the state, but by third-party funds. By 2004, more than 70 students had taken part in the program.

Schrüfer was active in the Chinese-German University College (CDHK) at Tongji University in Shanghai. The CDHK, which specializes in mechanical engineering, electrical engineering and economics, which was run by the German Academic Exchange Service (DAAD), and was financed by both DAAD and German companies. Schrüfer helped plan and set up the electrical engineering branch of study and was its director until 2005. As part of this project, over 200 Chinese electrical engineering students came to TUM between 1998 and 2013, 150 of whom obtained a double master's degree from Tongji University Shanghai and TUM.

In addition to teaching and research, Schrüfer made numerous contributions within and outside the university. From 1989 to 1991, he was Dean of the Faculty of Electrical Engineering and Information Technology. He was a member of the Faculty Council for many years and a reviewer for the German Research Foundation, the Alexander von Humboldt Foundation and the Volkswagen Foundation. In 1986 on the occasion of an honorary colloquium on the 70th birthday of Theodor Gast, Professor of Metrology at the TU Berlin, the idea was born to found a "Working Group of University Professors of Metrology" (AHMT) was founded. Schrüfer was the first chairman, and remained in the post until 1991. The annual conferences of the AHMT became an essential part of scientific communication in the field of colleges and universities as well as the metrology industry.

== Awards and honors ==
- 1991 Festschrift for the 60th birthday of Prof. E. Schrüfer (Messen & Prüfen Volume 10, 1991)
- 1992 Honorary doctorate from the Kyiv Polytechnic Institute
- 1993 Order of Merit of the Federal Republic of Germany (Cross of Merit)
- 1998 Karl Max von Bauernfeind Medal of the Technical University of Munich
- 2000 Honorary doctorate from the Gheorghe Asachi Technical University of Iași
- 2004 Honorary doctorate from the National Aviation University in Kyiv
- 2013 Honorary Senator of the Chinese-German University College (CDHK) at Tongji University Shanghai.
