= Hongkou, Shanghai =

Coordinates: 31°16′13″N 121°28′48″E

Hongkou 虹口区; 虹口區
- District
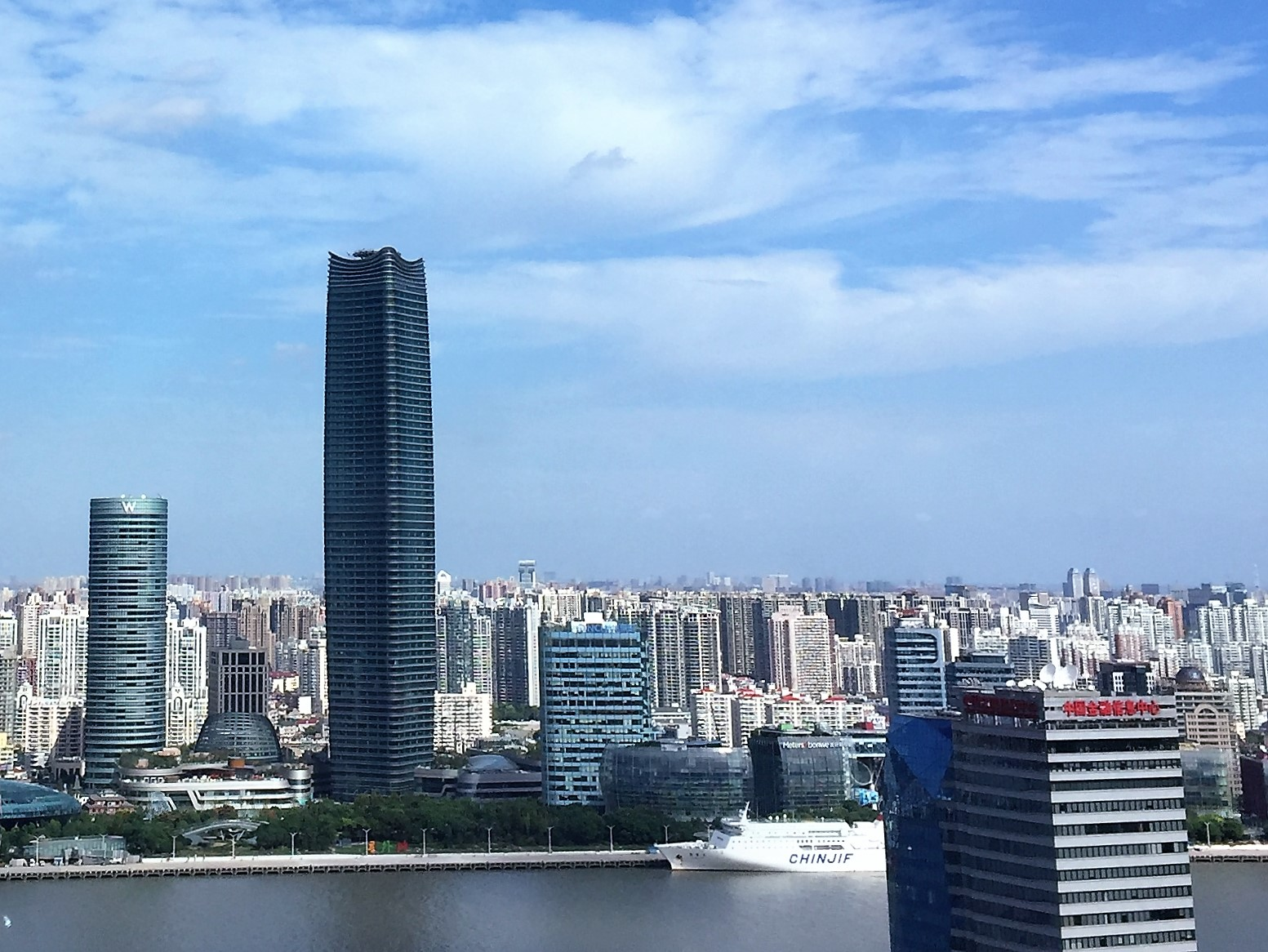
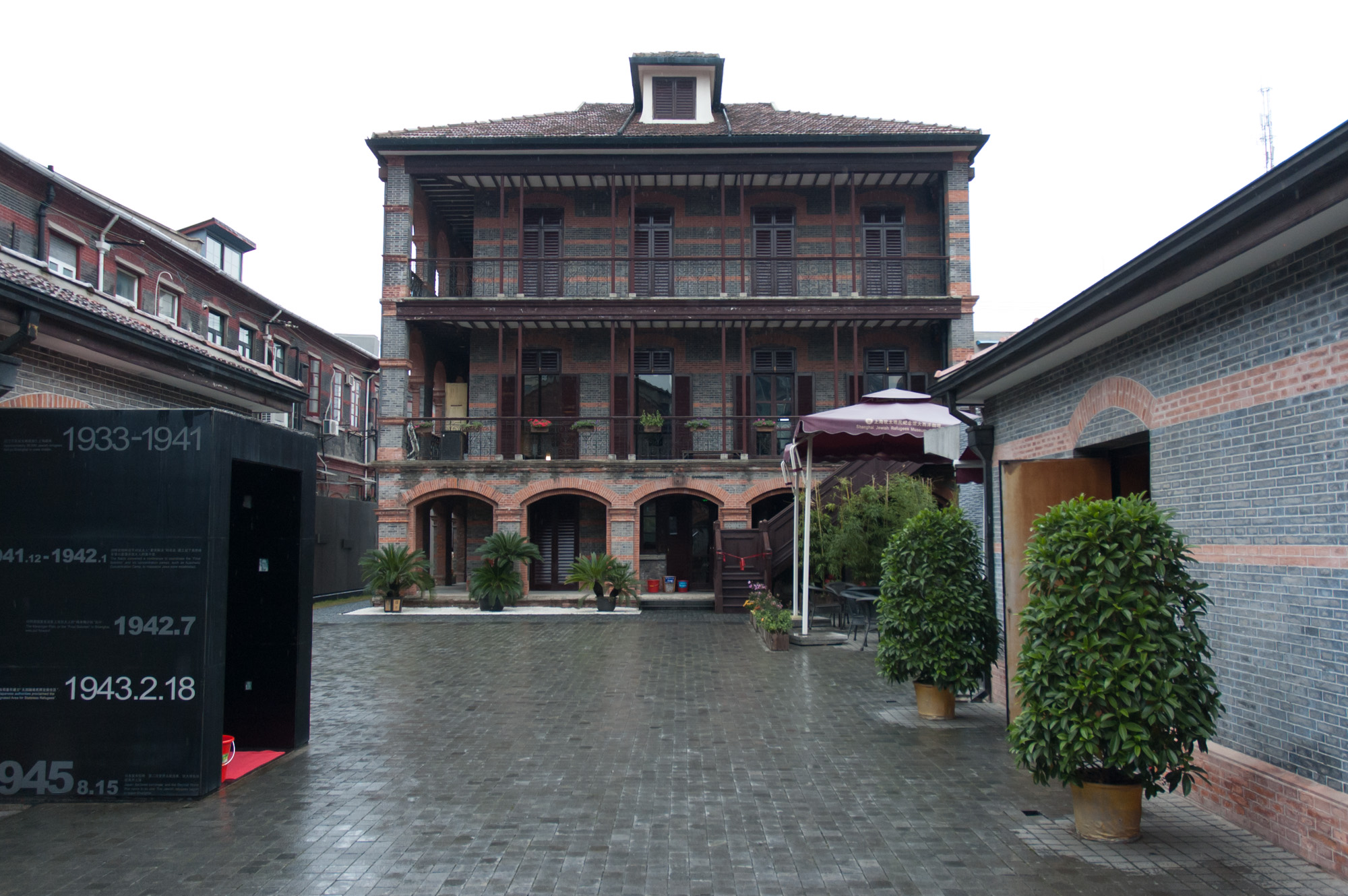
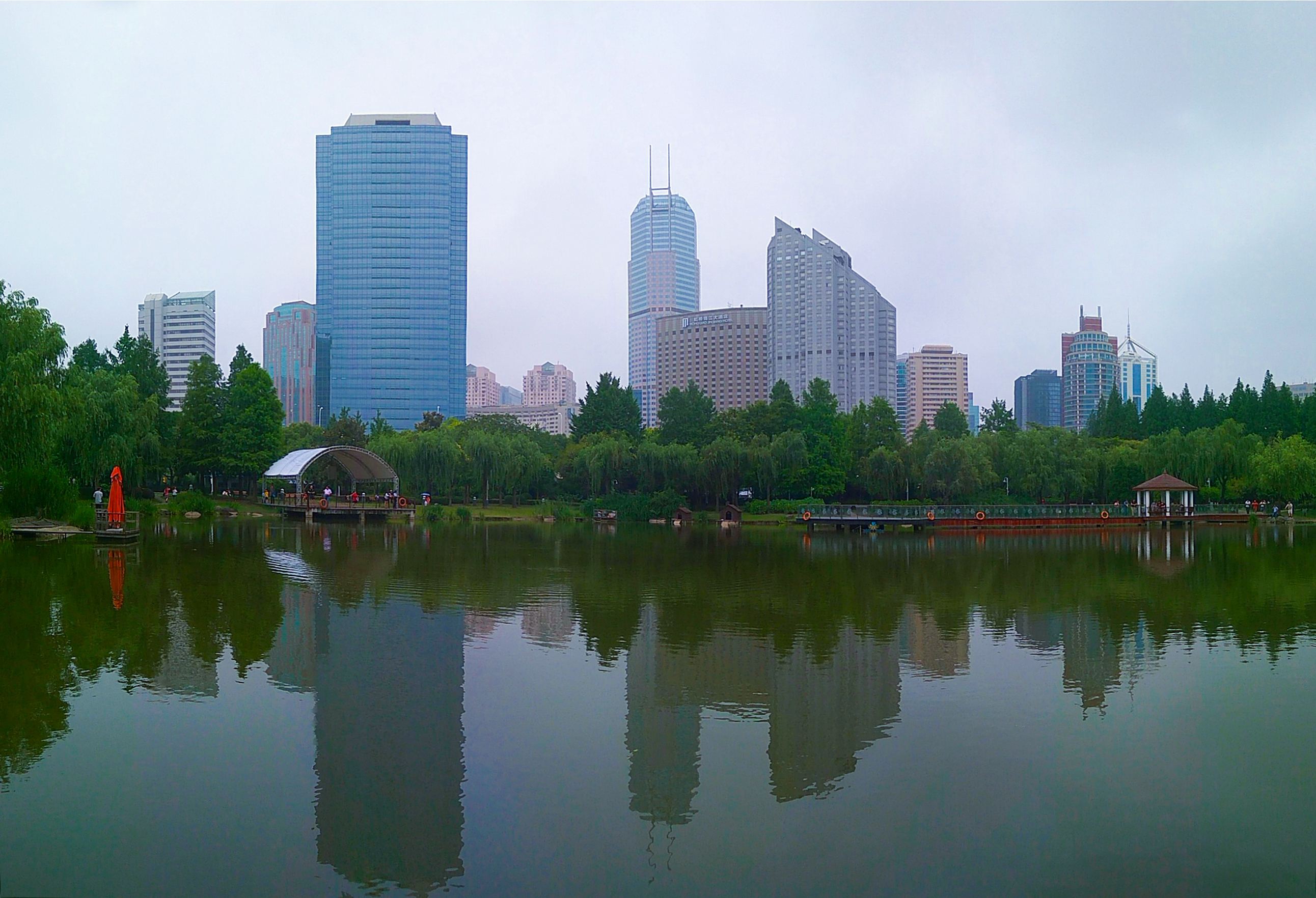
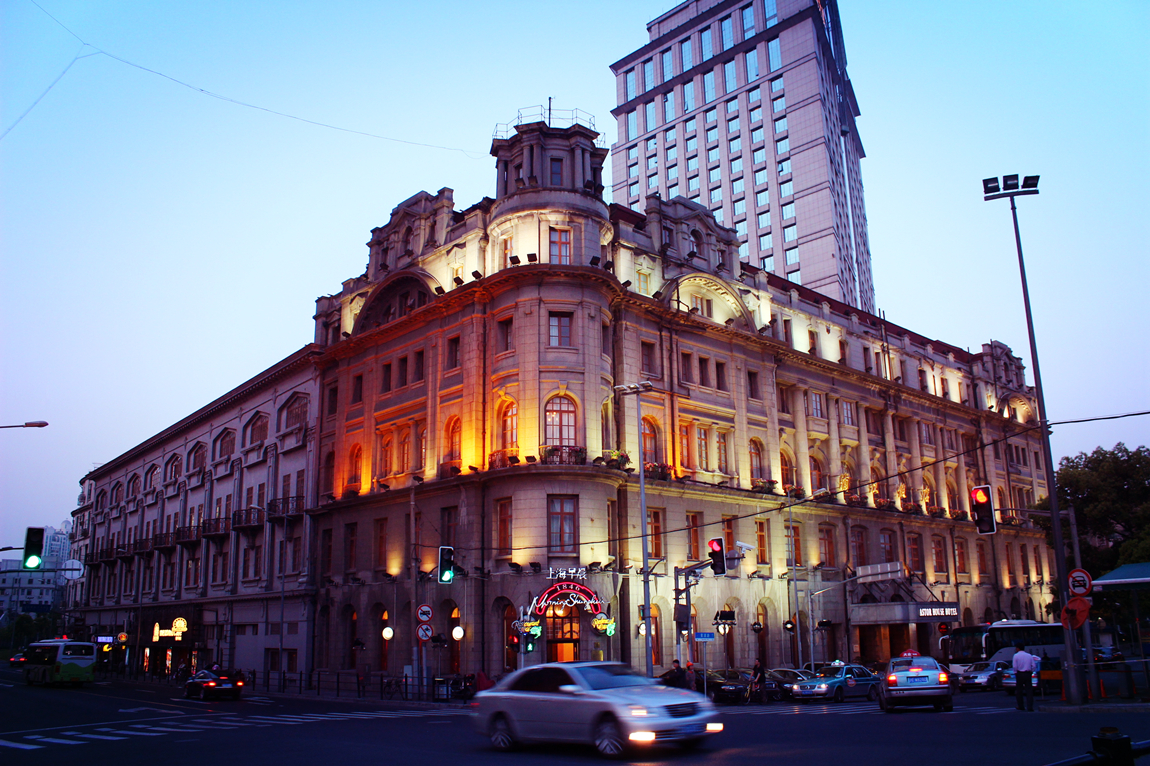
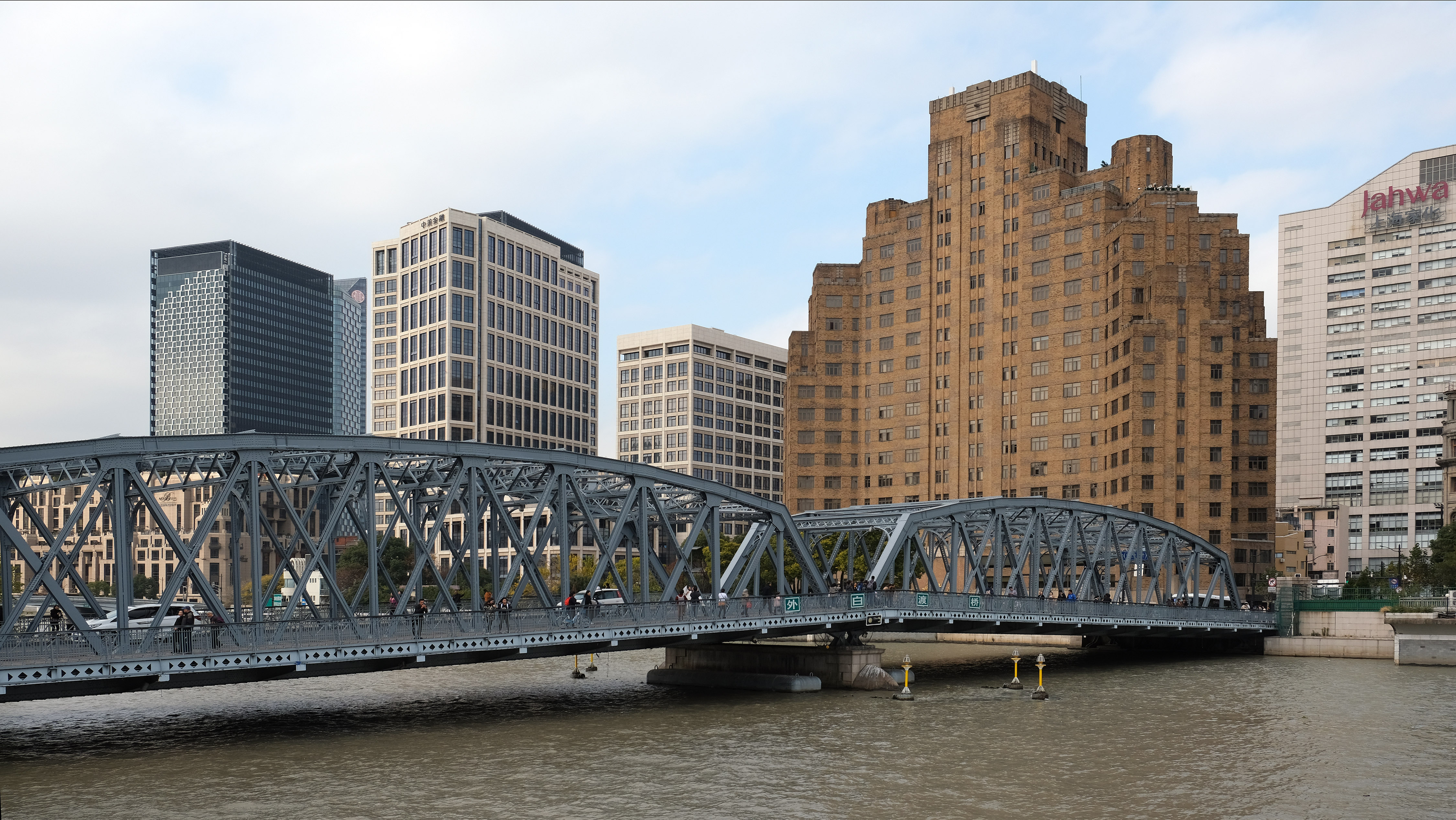
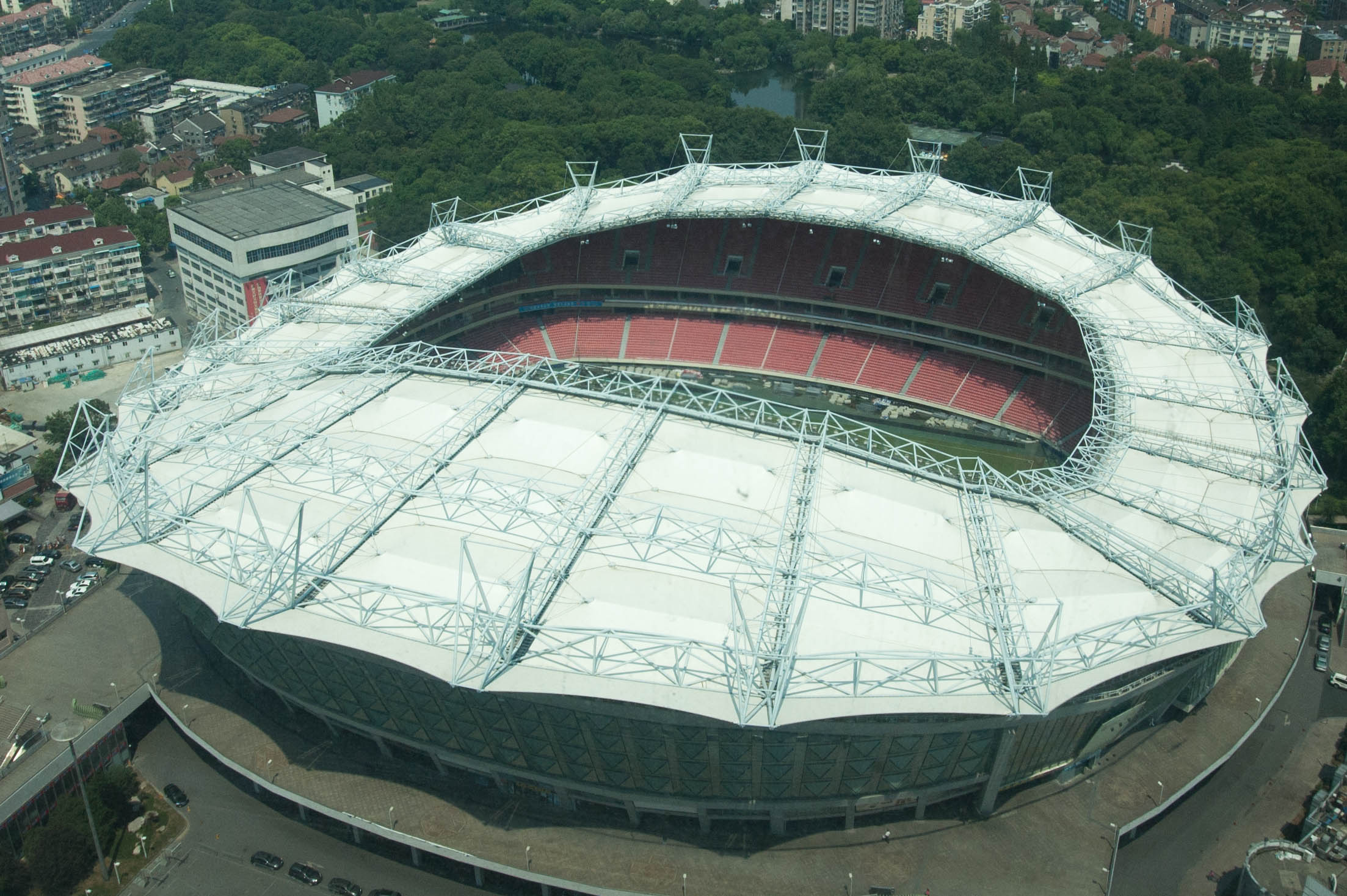
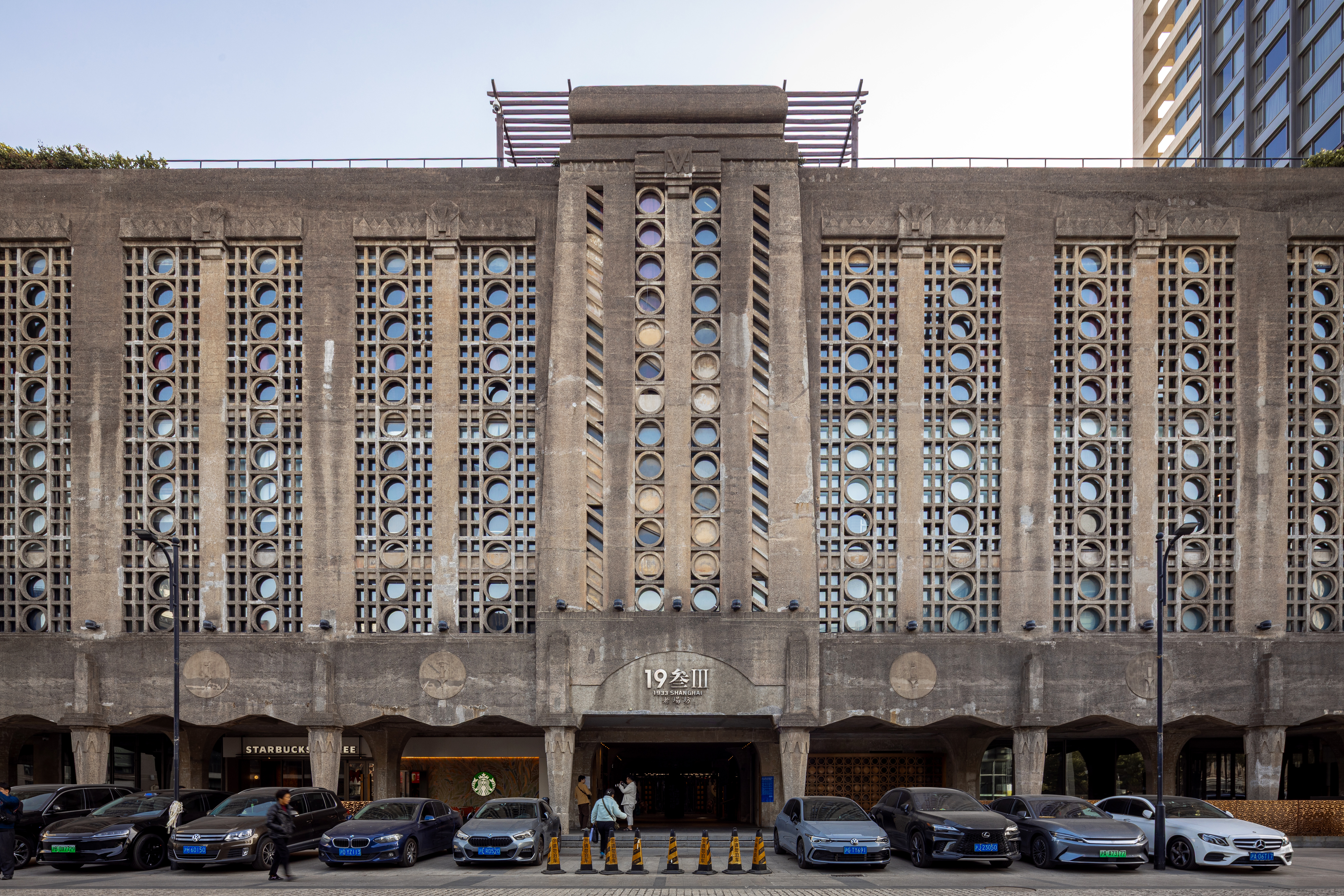
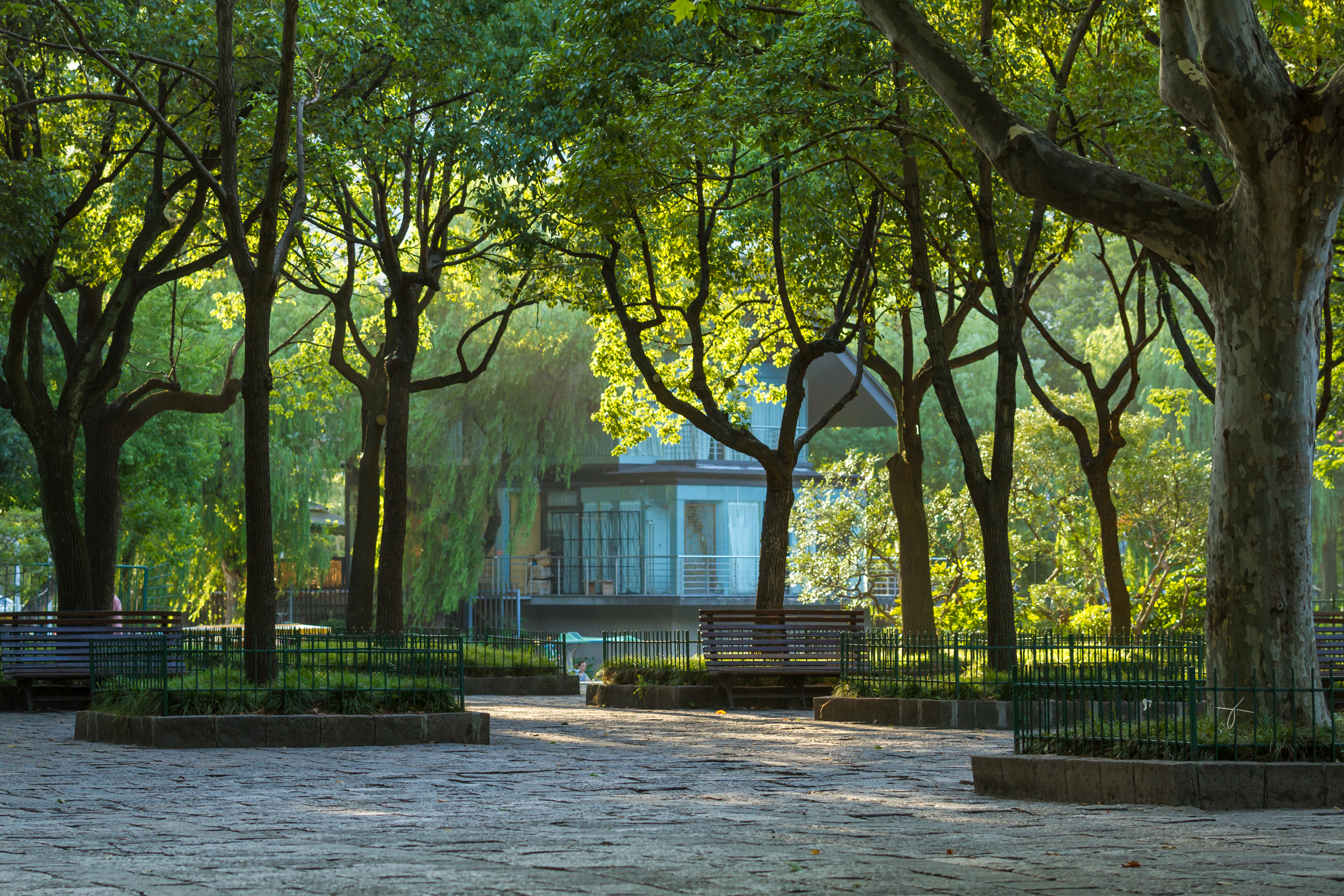
- Skyline of the North Bund Shanghai Jewish Refugees Museum Gubei Astor House Hotel Waibaidu Bridge with the Broadway Mansions Hongkou Football Stadium 1933 Old Millfun Lu Xun Park

- Hongkou in Shanghai
- Interactive map of Hongkou
- Country: People's Republic of China
- Municipality: Shanghai

Area
  - Total: 23.48 km^{2} (9.07 sq mi)

Population (2020)
  - Total: 757,498
  - Density: 32,260/km^{2} (83,560/sq mi)
- Time zone: UTC+8 (China Standard)
- Division code: HKQ
- Website: www.shhk.gov.cn

Hongkou, Shanghai
- Simplified Chinese: 虹口区
- Traditional Chinese: 虹口區
- Wugniu: ghon^{2} kheu^{3} chiu^{1}
- Postal: Hongkew
Transcriptions
Standard Mandarin
- Hanyu Pinyin: Hóngkǒu Qū
Wu
- Wugniu: ghon^{2} kheu^{3} chiu^{1}
- IPA: Shanghainese: [ɦoŋ˩ kʰɤ˦ tɕʰy˩]
Yue: Cantonese
- Jyutping: hung^{4} hau^{2} keoi^{1}

Hongkou (formerly spelled Hongkew) is a district of Shanghai, forming part of the northern urban core. It has a land area of 23.48 km^{2} (9.07 sq mi) and a population of 757,498 as of 2020. The district borders Yangpu to the east, Pudong to the southeast, Huangpu to the southwest, Jing'an to the west and Baoshan to the north.

It is the location of the Astor House Hotel, Broadway Mansions, Lu Xun Park, and Hongkou Football Stadium. It was once known as Shanghai's "Little Tokyo." Hongkou is home to the Shanghai International Studies University, the Shanghai University of Finance and Economics, and the 1933 Old Millfun.

== History ==
During the Tang dynasty, the area in modern Hongkou District may have been a beach included in a seawall (捍海塘) near the East China Sea. In the early Ming dynasty, it became known as 黃埔口 (Huangpukou) or 洪口 (Hongkou), as there is a river mouth debouched into the Huangpu River, in the early Qing dynasty, it was renamed as 虹口 (Hongkou).

In 1845, an American bishop W. J. Boone bought an area of land there, and it later evolved into the American Concession in Shanghai in 1848 and merged into the International Concession in 1863. It was in large part reduced to rubble during the Second World war when Shanghai was occupied by the Japanese. Under the Japanese occupation, 20,000 Ashkenazi Jewish refugees from Nazi-occupied Europe lived in an overcrowded square-mile section known to as the Shanghai Ghetto, in the Tilanqiao neighborhood of Hongkew.

In 1947, it was renamed as Hongkou District.

== Subdistricts ==
Hongkou is responsible for the administration of the following subdistricts.

Name	Chinese (S)	Hanyu Pinyin	Shanghainese Romanization	Population (2010)	Area (km^{2})
Ouyang Road Subdistrict	欧阳路街道	Ōuyánglù Jiēdào	oe yan lu ka do	73,328	1.67
Quyang Road Subdistrict	曲阳路街道	Qūyánglù Jiēdào	chioq yan lu ka do	102,564	3.05
Guangzhong Road Subdistrict	广中路街道	Guǎngzhōnglù Jiēdào	kuaon tzon lu ka do	122,669	2.89
Jiaxing Road Subdistrict	嘉兴路街道	Jiāxìnglù Jiēdào	cia ka xin lu ka do	125,634	2.63
Liangcheng Xincun Subdistrict	凉城新村街道	Liángchéng Xīncūn Jiēdào	lian zen sin tsen ka do	98,094	3.14
Sichuan North Road Subdistrict	四川北路街道	Sìchuānběilù Jiēdào	sy tseu poq lu ka do	87,401	2.33
Tilanqiao Subdistrict	提篮桥街道	Tílán qiáo Jiēdào	tiq leh djio ka do	113,751	2.36
Jiangwanzhen Subdistrict	江湾镇街道	Jiāngwānzhèn Jiēdào	kaon ue tzen ka do	129,035	4.17

== Economy ==
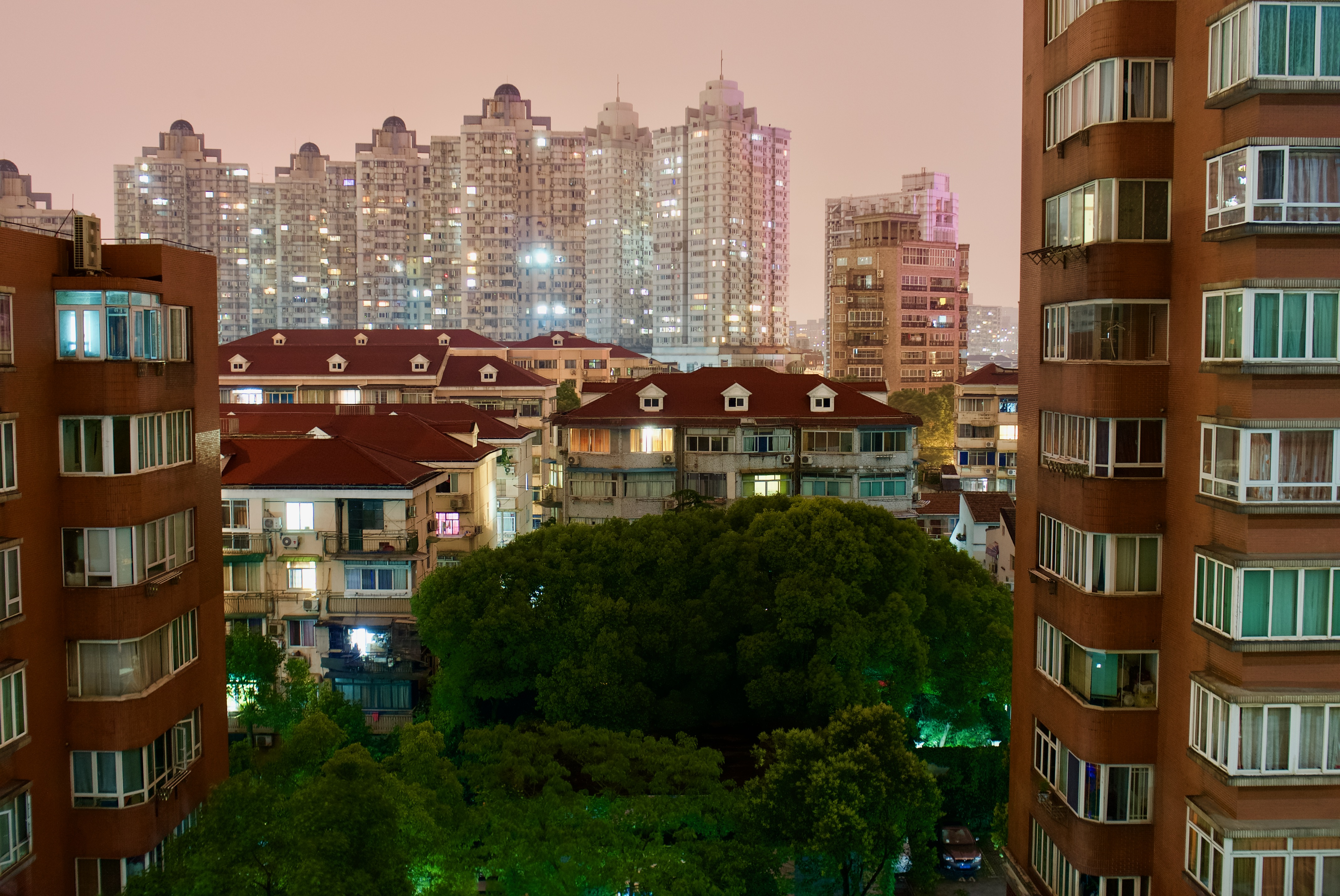
A look at the Bao Steel Building in Hongkou

Previously Lianhua Supermarket had its Shanghai office in the district.

== Schools ==
- Hongkou Experimental School
- Shanghai Beihong Senior High School
- Shanghai Beijiao Senior High School
- Shanghai Chengzhong Senior High School
- Shanghai Jiguang Senior High School
- Shanghai No.1 Normal Senior High School
- Shanghai Fuxing Senior High School
- Shanghai Hongkou Senior High School
- Shanghai Hainan middle school

=== International schools ===
Russian Consulate School in Shanghai is a Russian overseas primary school operated by the Russian Ministry of Foreign Affairs, located on the grounds of the Consulate-General of Russia in Shanghai in Hongkou District.

== Transportation ==
=== Metro ===
Hongkou is currently served by five metro lines operated by Shanghai Metro:

- Line 3 - Dongbaoxing Road, Hongkou Football Stadium 8 , Chifeng Road, Dabaishu, Jiangwan Town
- Line 4 - Hailun Road 10 , Linping Road
- Line 8 - Siping Road 10 , Quyang Road, Hongkou Football Stadium 3
- Line 10 - North Sichuan Road, Hailun Road 4 , Youdian Xincun, Siping Road 8
- Line 12 - International Cruise Terminal, Tilanqiao
