= Hongkou Football Stadium station =

Shanghai Metro interchange station

Hongkou Football Stadium 虹口足球场
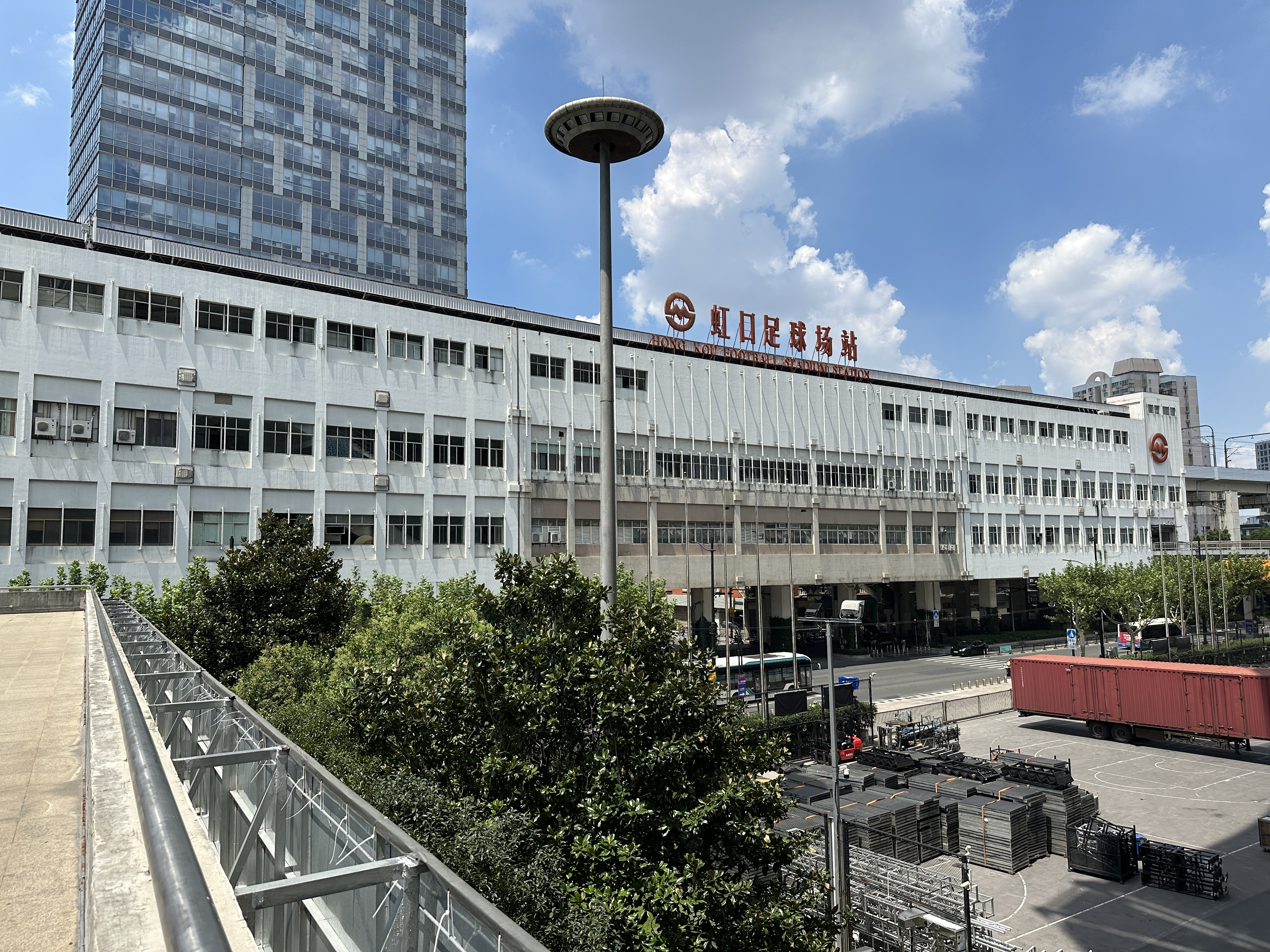
- Station building

General information
- Location: Dongjiangwan Road (东江湾路); Hongkou District, Shanghai; China
- Coordinates: 31°16′17″N 121°28′45″E
- Operator: Shanghai No. 3/4 Metro Operation Co. Ltd.
- Lines: Line 3; Line 8
- Platforms: 4 (1 island platform for Line 8 and 2 side platforms for Line 3)
- Tracks: 4

Construction
- Structure type: Elevated (Line 3); Underground (Line 8)
- Accessible: Yes

History
- Opened: 26 December 2000; 25 years ago (Line 3); 29 December 2007; 18 years ago (Line 8)

Services
Preceding station	Shanghai Metro	Following station
Chifeng Road towards North Jiangyang Road	Line 3	Dongbaoxing Road towards Shanghai South Railway Station
Quyang Road towards Shiguang Road	Line 8	North Xizang Road towards Shendu Highway
Location
- Location within Shanghai

Hongkou Football Stadium (Chinese: 虹口足球场; pinyin: Hóngkǒu Zúqiúchǎng) is an interchange station between Lines 3 and 8 on the Shanghai Metro. The station opened on 26 December 2000 as part of the initial section of Line 3 from Shanghai South Railway Station to Jiangwan Town; the interchange with Line 8 opened on 29 December 2007 as part of that line's initial section from Shiguang Road to Yaohua Road.

To interchange between these two lines it is unnecessary to exit the station and re-enter, though the platform for Line 3 is located above ground, while the platform for Line 8 is entirely underground, there has been escalators in the fare area since 2012, incorporated into the recently built Hongkou Plaza shopping mall.

Furthermore, the Line 3 platform has no barrier-free ground access, preventing transfers by disabled people without assistance.

== Station Layout ==
4F	Side platform, doors open on the right
4F	Northbound	← Line 3 towards North Jiangyang Road (Chifeng Road)
4F	Southbound	Line 3 towards Shanghai South Railway Station (Dongbaoxing Road) →
4F	Side platform, doors open on the right
3F	Line 3 Concourse	Faregates, Station Agent
G	Entrances and Exits	Exits 1-4
B1	Line 8 Concourse	Faregates, Station Agent
B2	Northbound	← Line 8 towards Shiguang Road (Quyang Road)
B2	Island platform, doors open on the right
B2	Southbound	Line 8 towards Shendu Highway (North Xizang Road) →

== Places nearby ==
- Hongkou Stadium, a large soccer stadium. There are 3 squash courts inside and a climbing wall that has been rebuilt in December 2008.
- Lu Xun Park
- Duolun Road Cultural Street
- Shanghai International Studies University, Dalian Road Campus
- Bus station with regional buses to places in the vicinity of Shanghai like Songjiang and Zhujiajiao (less than at Shanghai Stadium)

== Surface transport ==
Passengers may transfer to bus lines 21, 51, 52, 70, 132, 139, 167, 502, 537, 597, 854, Overnight Bus Routes 310 and 329, Airport Bus #4 (for Pudong International Airport), and a "lightering" bus route for Shanghai Metro Line 8 (轨道8号驳运线) which runs from People's Square to Yueyang Hospital (岳阳医院), only during rush hours.

== Gallery ==
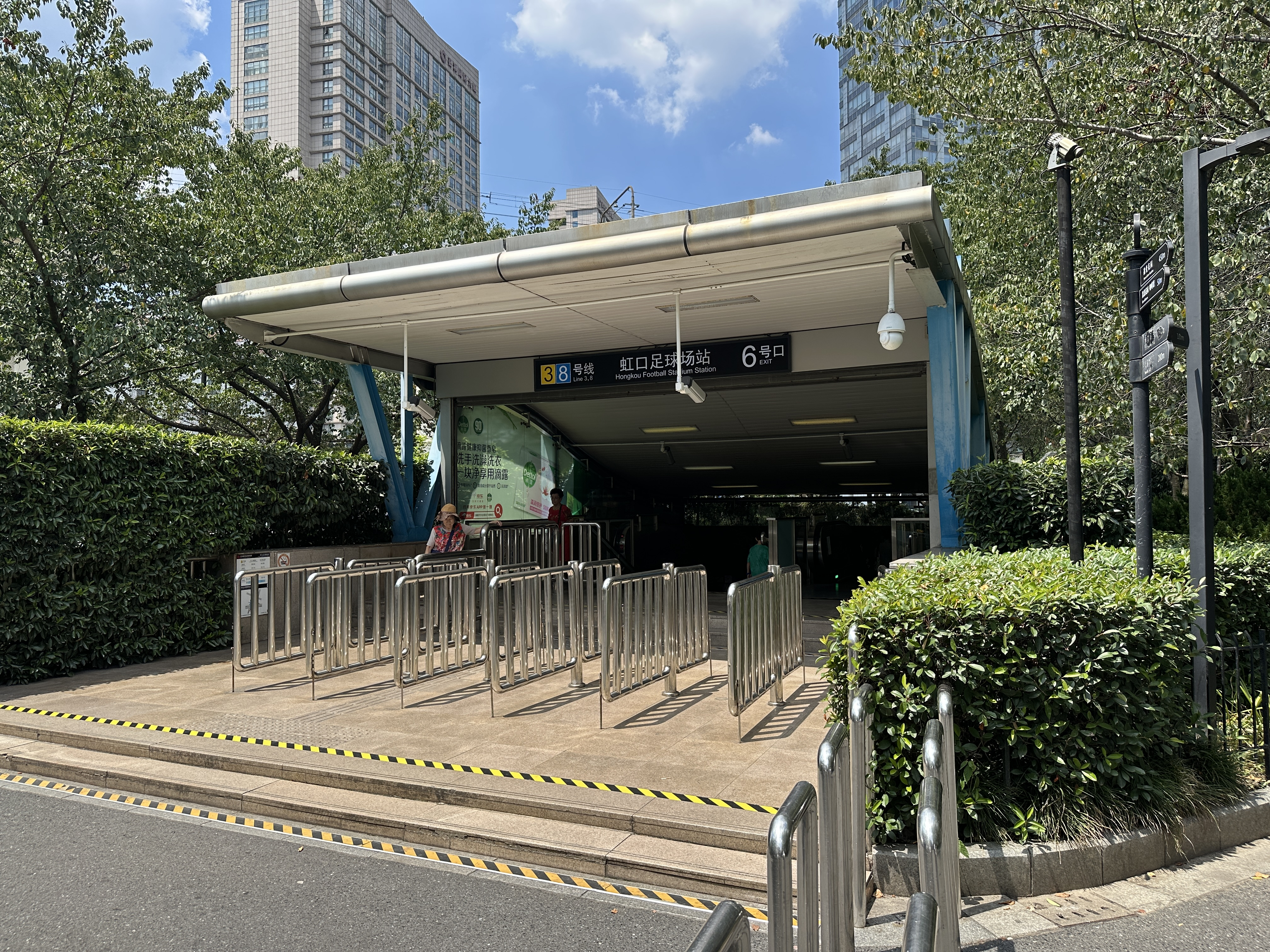
Exit 6

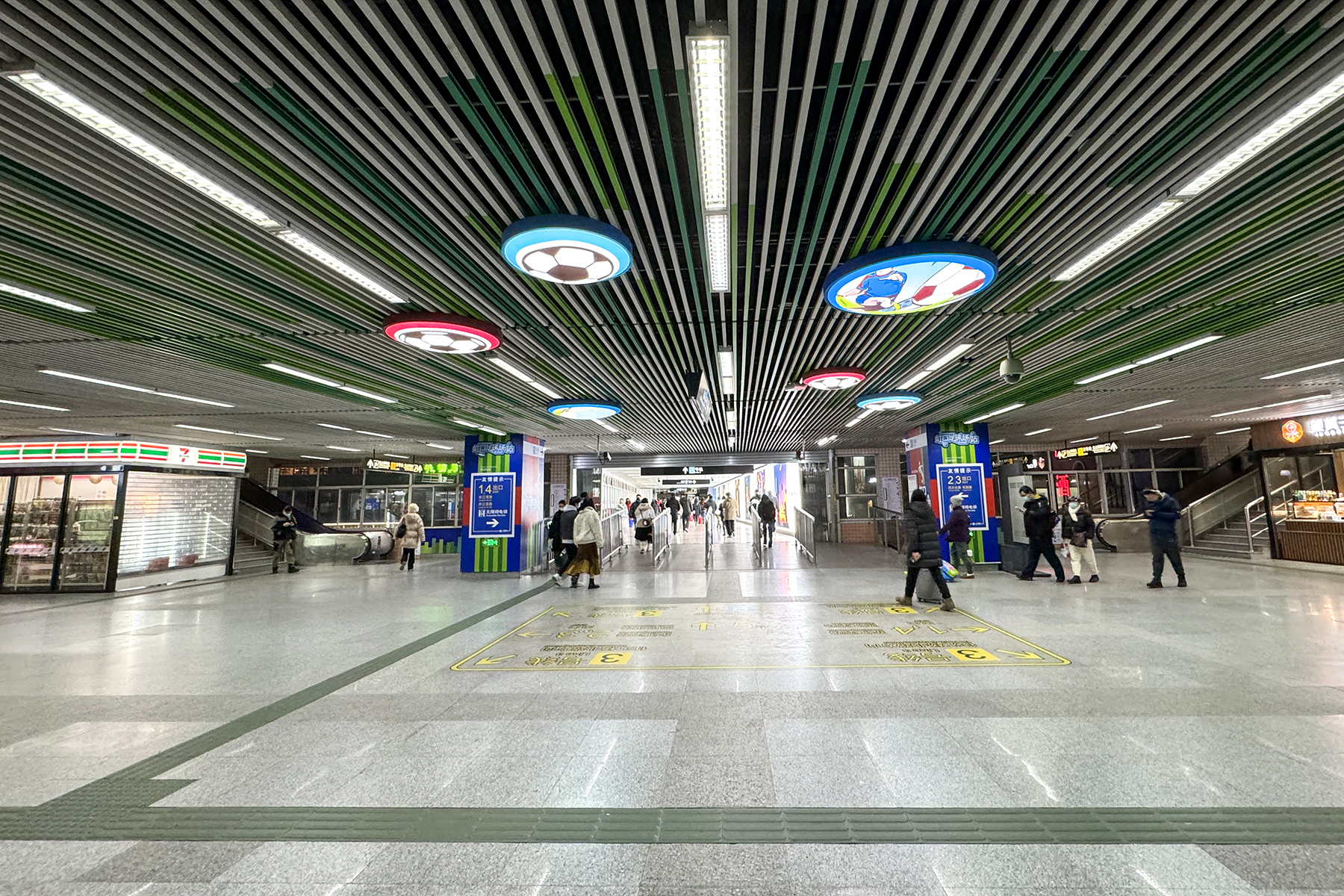
Concourse

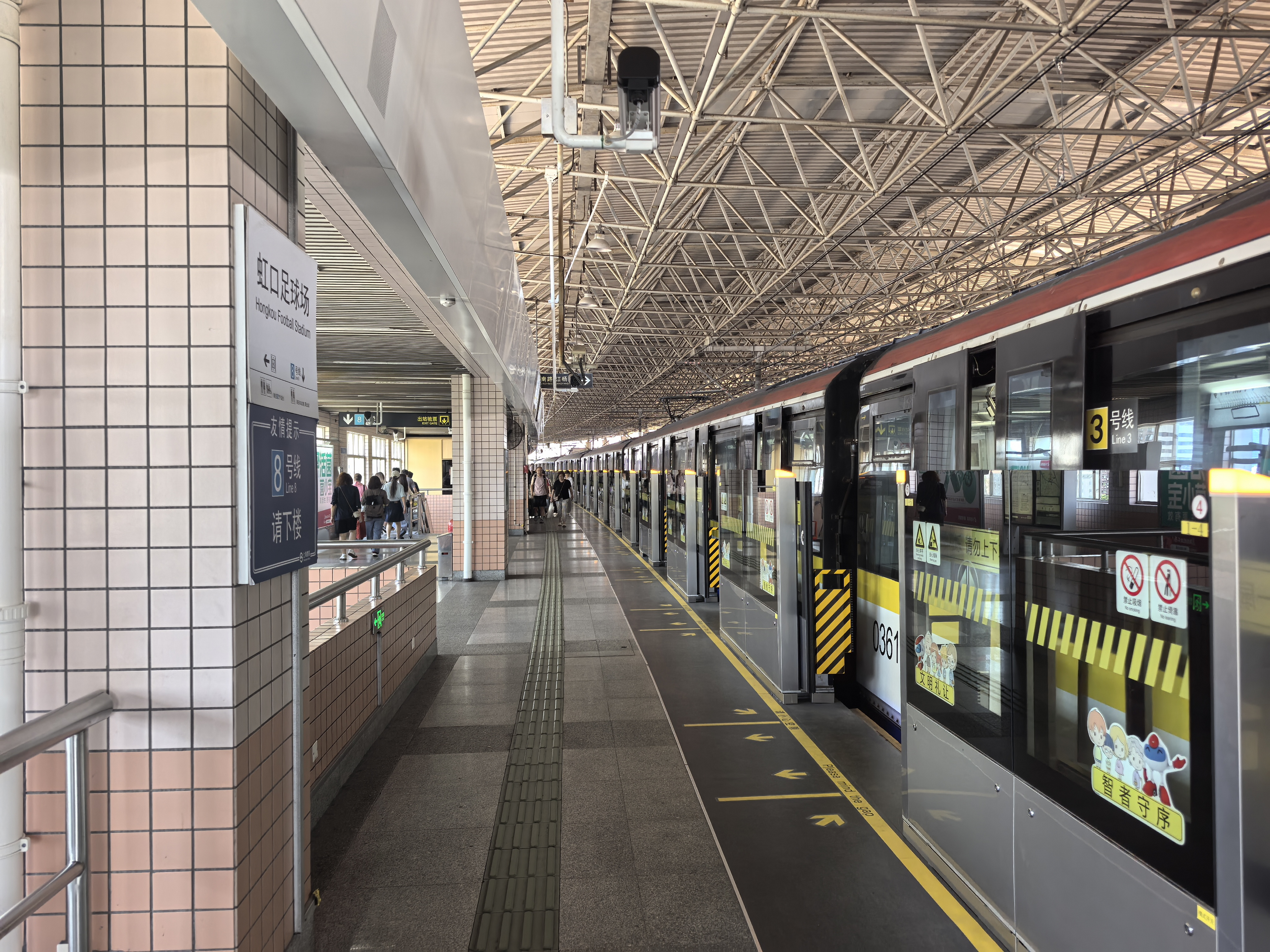
Line 3 platform

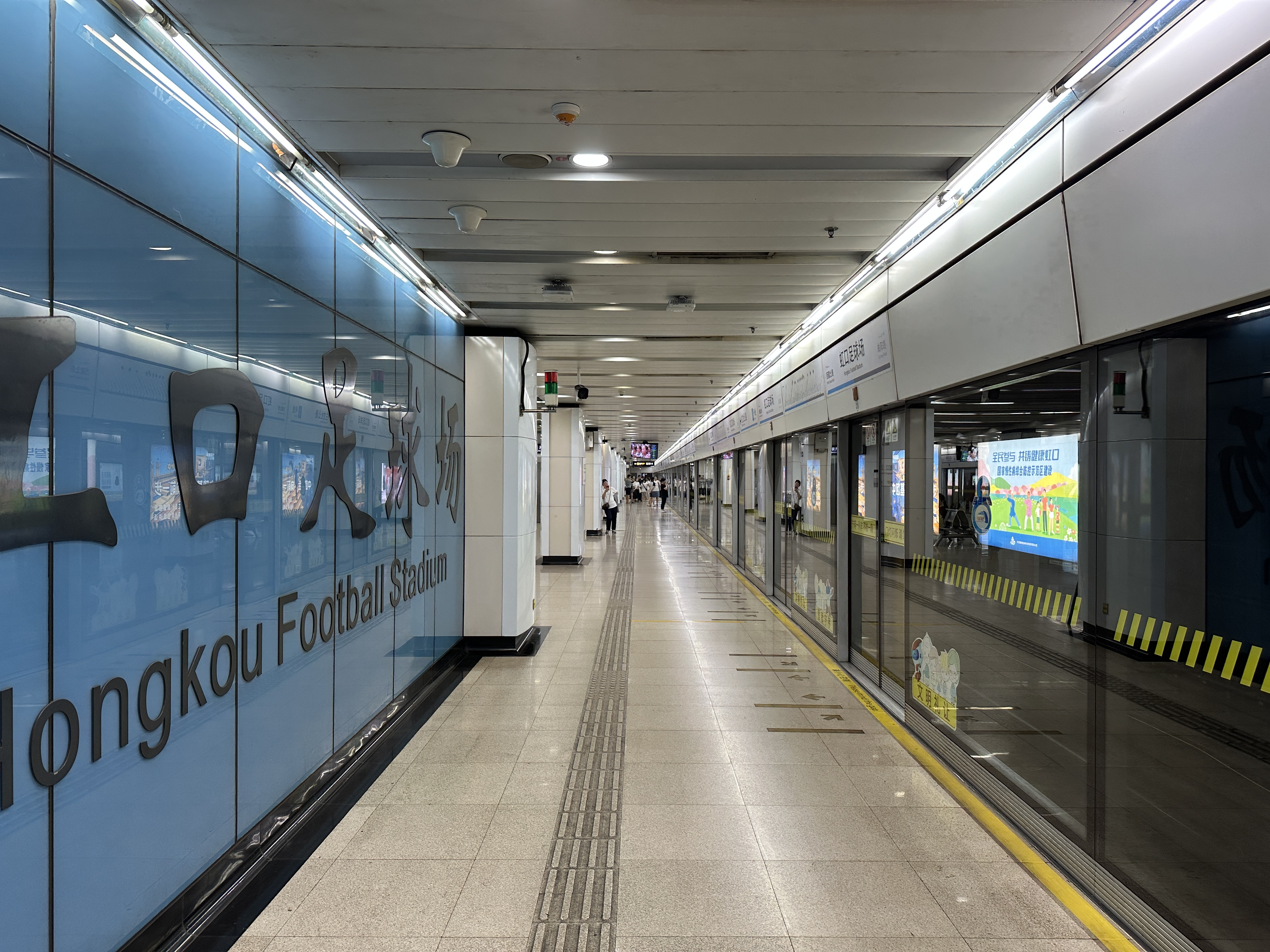
Line 8 platform
