= Dabaishu station =

Shanghai Metro station

Dabaishu 大柏树
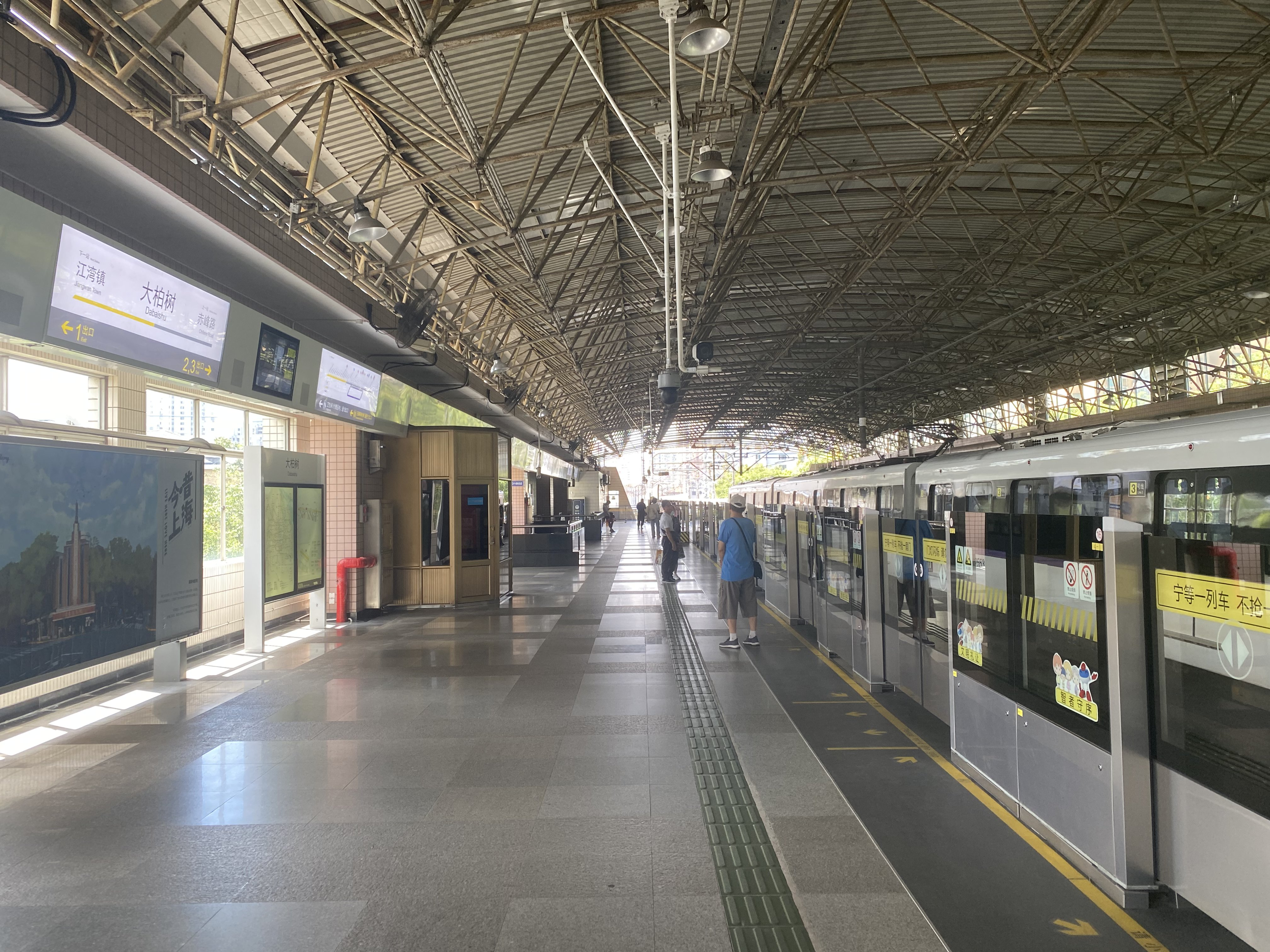
- Station platform

General information
- Location: East Wenshui Road and Guangji Road (广纪路); Hongkou District, Shanghai; China
- Coordinates: 31°17′22″N 121°29′00″E
- Operator: Shanghai No. 3 Metro Operation Co. Ltd.
- Line: Line 3
- Platforms: 2 (2 side platforms)
- Tracks: 2

Construction
- Structure type: Elevated
- Accessible: Yes

History
- Opened: 26 December 2000; 25 years ago
- Former names: East Wenshui Road (up to 28 October 2006)

Services
Preceding station	Shanghai Metro	Following station
Jiangwan Town towards North Jiangyang Road	Line 3	Chifeng Road towards Shanghai South Railway Station
Location
- Location within Shanghai

Dabaishu (simplified Chinese: 大柏树; traditional Chinese: 大柏樹; pinyin: Dàbǎishù) is a station on the Shanghai Metro Line 3. The station opened on 26 December 2000 as part of the initial section of Line 3 from Shanghai South Railway Station to Jiangwan Town.

Until October 2006, it was known as East Wenshui Road station (simplified Chinese: 汶水东路; traditional Chinese: 汶水東路; pinyin: Wènshuǐ Dōng Lù), which could be confused with Wenshui Road station on Line 1. The name was changed according to the new convention to name metro stations after famous streets or sights nearby rather than the vertical street neighbouring the station, making it easier for visitors to find these places.

== Places nearby ==
- Dabaishu Industry and Trading Center
