= Dongbaoxing Road station =

Shanghai Metro station

Dongbaoxing Road 东宝兴路
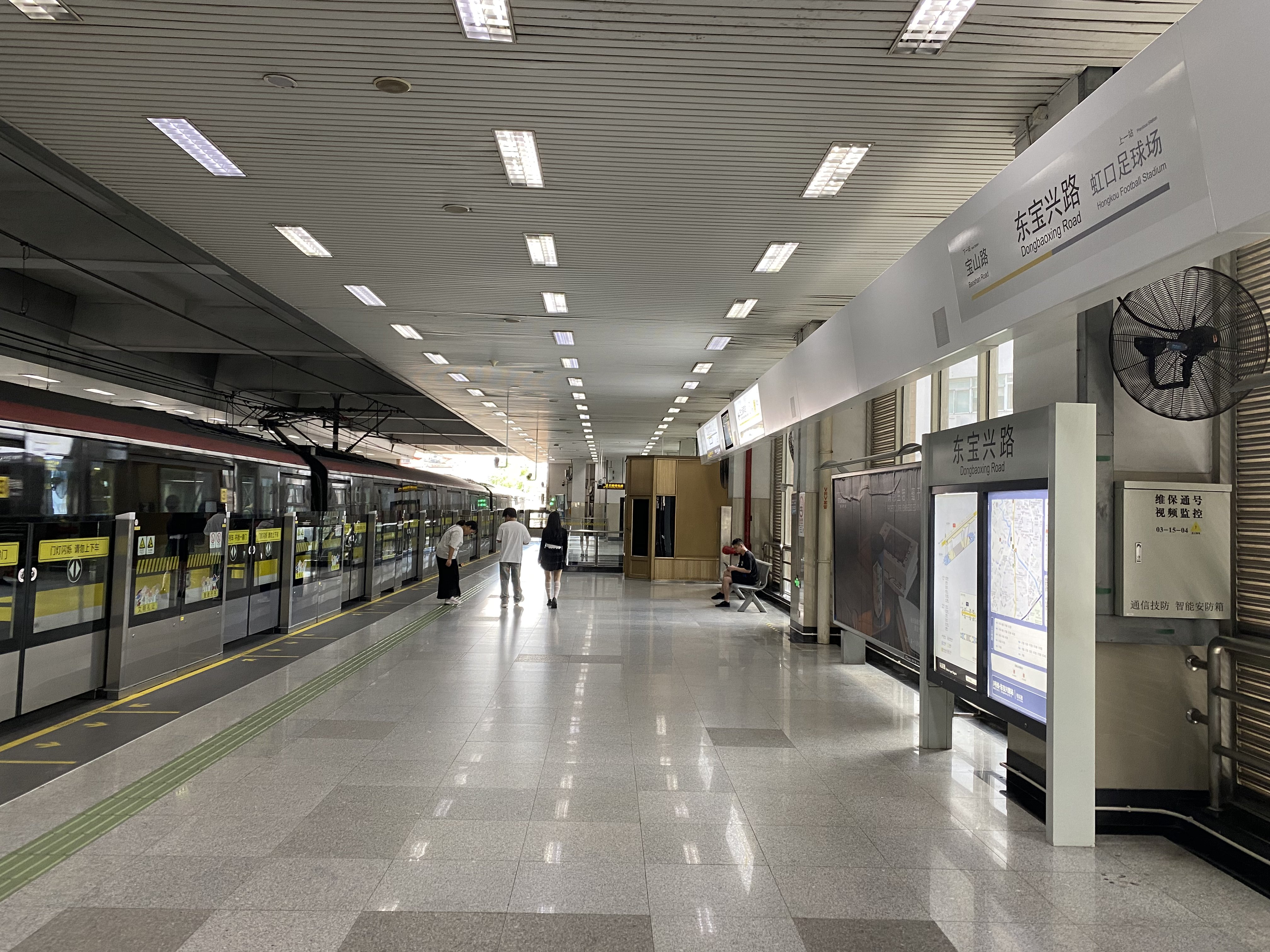
- Station platform

General information
- Location: Dongbaoxing Road and Baoshan Road; Hongkou District, Shanghai; China
- Coordinates: 31°15′36″N 121°28′49″E
- Operator: Shanghai No. 3 Metro Operation Co. Ltd.
- Line: Line 3
- Platforms: 2 (2 side platforms)
- Tracks: 2

Construction
- Structure type: Elevated
- Accessible: Yes

History
- Opened: 26 December 2000; 25 years ago

Services
Preceding station	Shanghai Metro	Following station
Hongkou Football Stadium towards North Jiangyang Road	Line 3	Baoshan Road towards Shanghai South Railway Station
Location
- Location within Shanghai

Dongbaoxing Road (simplified Chinese: 东宝兴路; traditional Chinese: 東寶興路; pinyin: Dōngbǎoxīng Lù) is a station on Shanghai Metro Line 3. The station opened on 26 December 2000 as part of the initial section of Line 3 from Shanghai South Railway Station to Jiangwan Town. Towards South, this is the last station before sharing with Line 4.

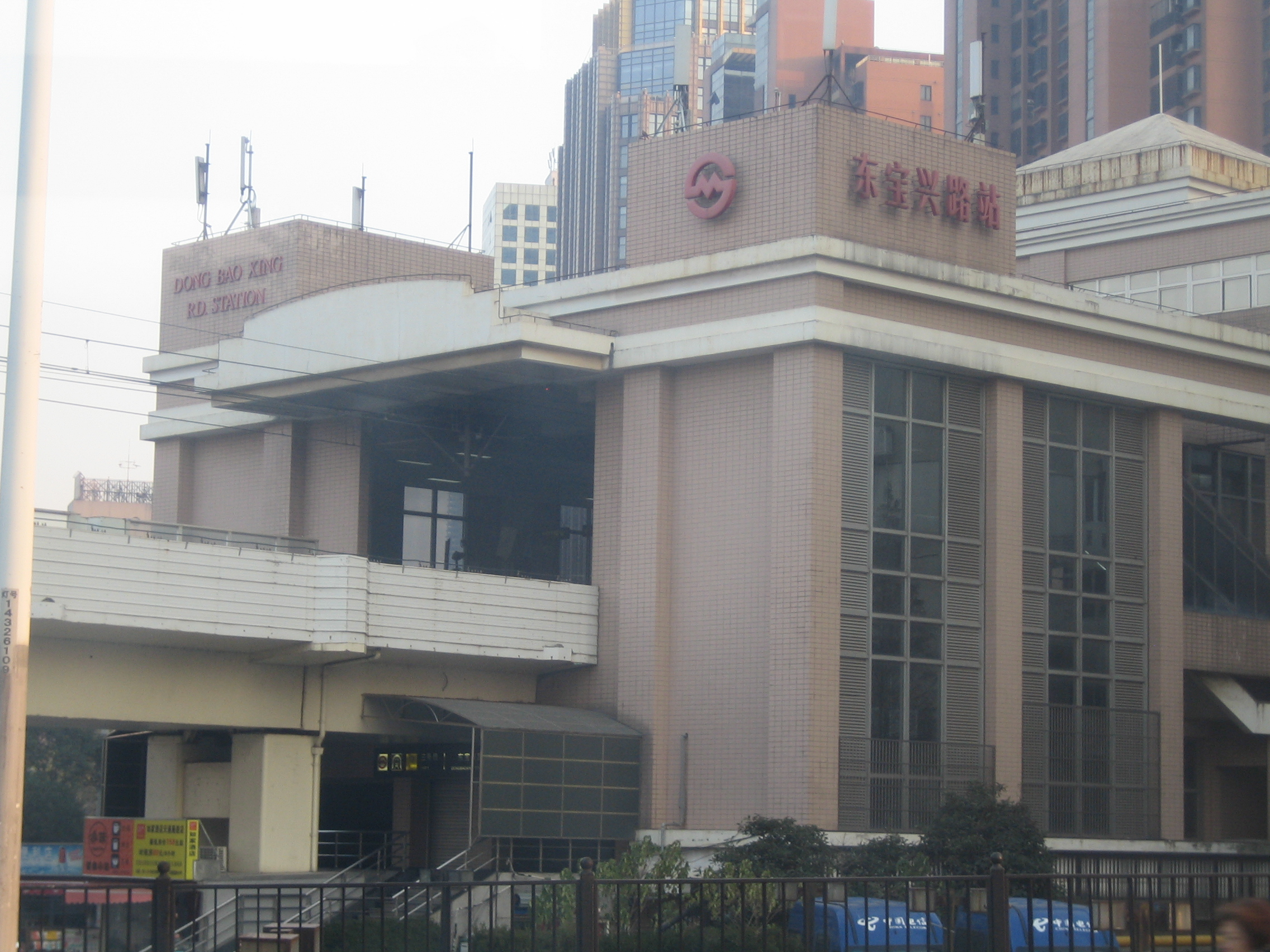
Station building
