= 1933 Old Millfun =

Building complex in Shanghai, China

Coordinates: 31°15′23.88″N 121°29′16.26″E

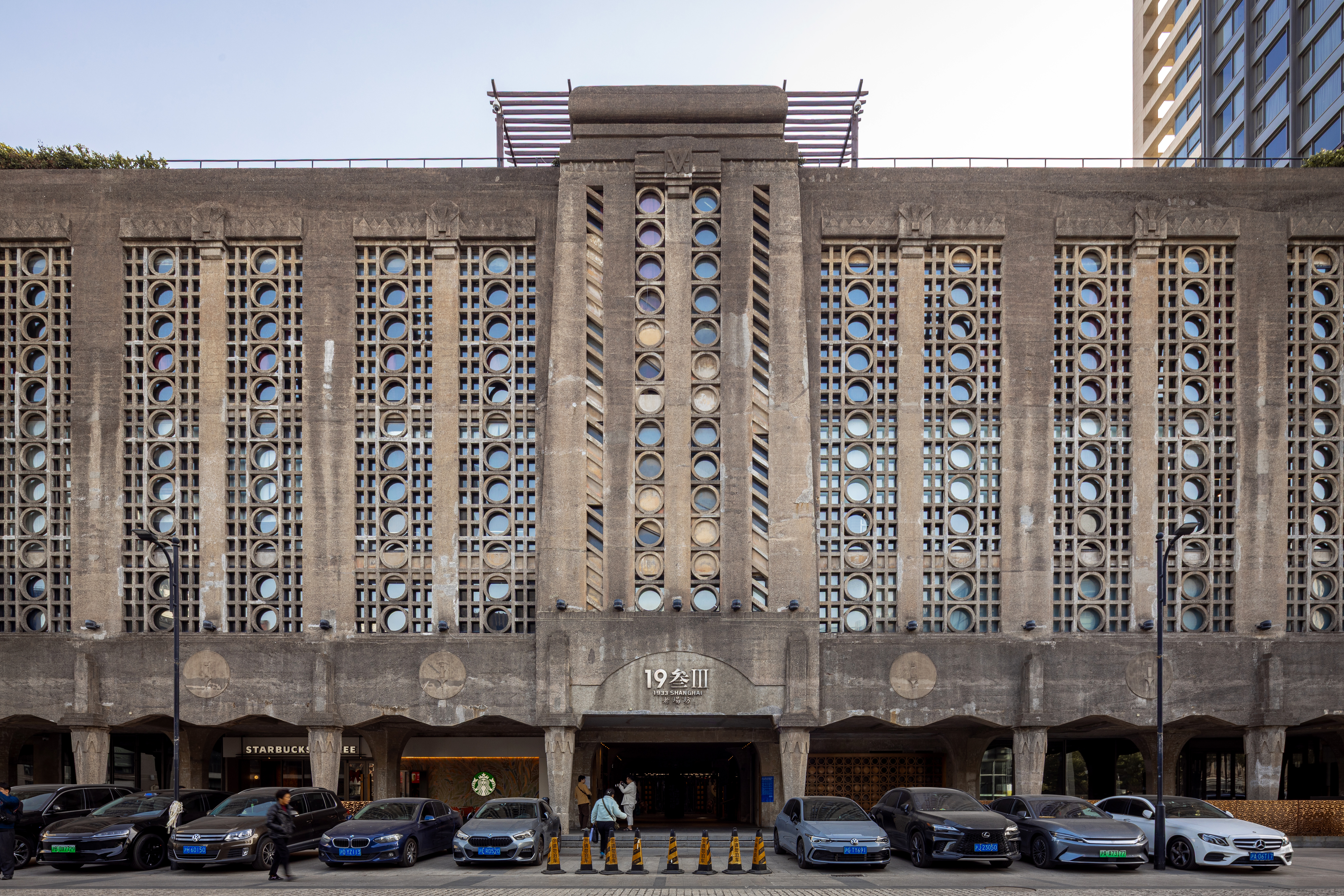
Exterior of 1933, or "Old Millfun" as of 2025

1933 (or "Old Millfun") is a complex of restaurants and shops in Hongkou District of Shanghai, China. The poured-concrete structures once housed the Shanghai Municipal Council Slaughterhouse, the largest slaughterhouse in Shanghai at the time.

== History ==
The five buildings were built in 1933 during the Republic of China period. Property managers say that they comprise 32,500 square meters, described by the Atlas Obscura travel guide as "an eerie Gotham-Deco achievement in concrete, glass, and steel, and the last remaining of its design in the world." Curved staircases, bridged walkways, and thick walls give the complex a unique industrial aura, especially for an area aspiring to house cuisine and the arts.

The buildings were under renovation in 1998 after years of abandonment. The building became old and decayed and occupied by squatters.

== Gallery ==
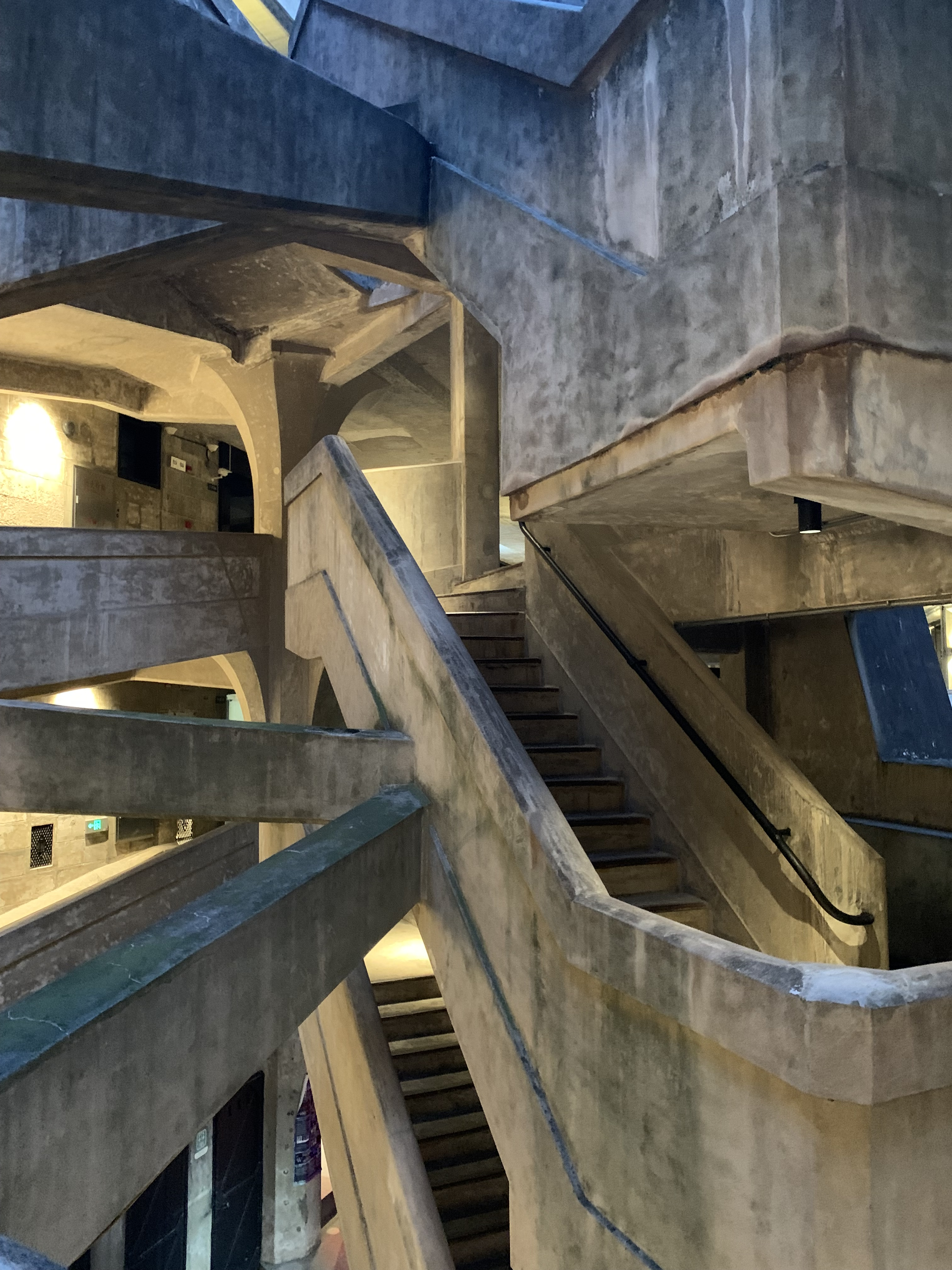
The overarching exposed stairs

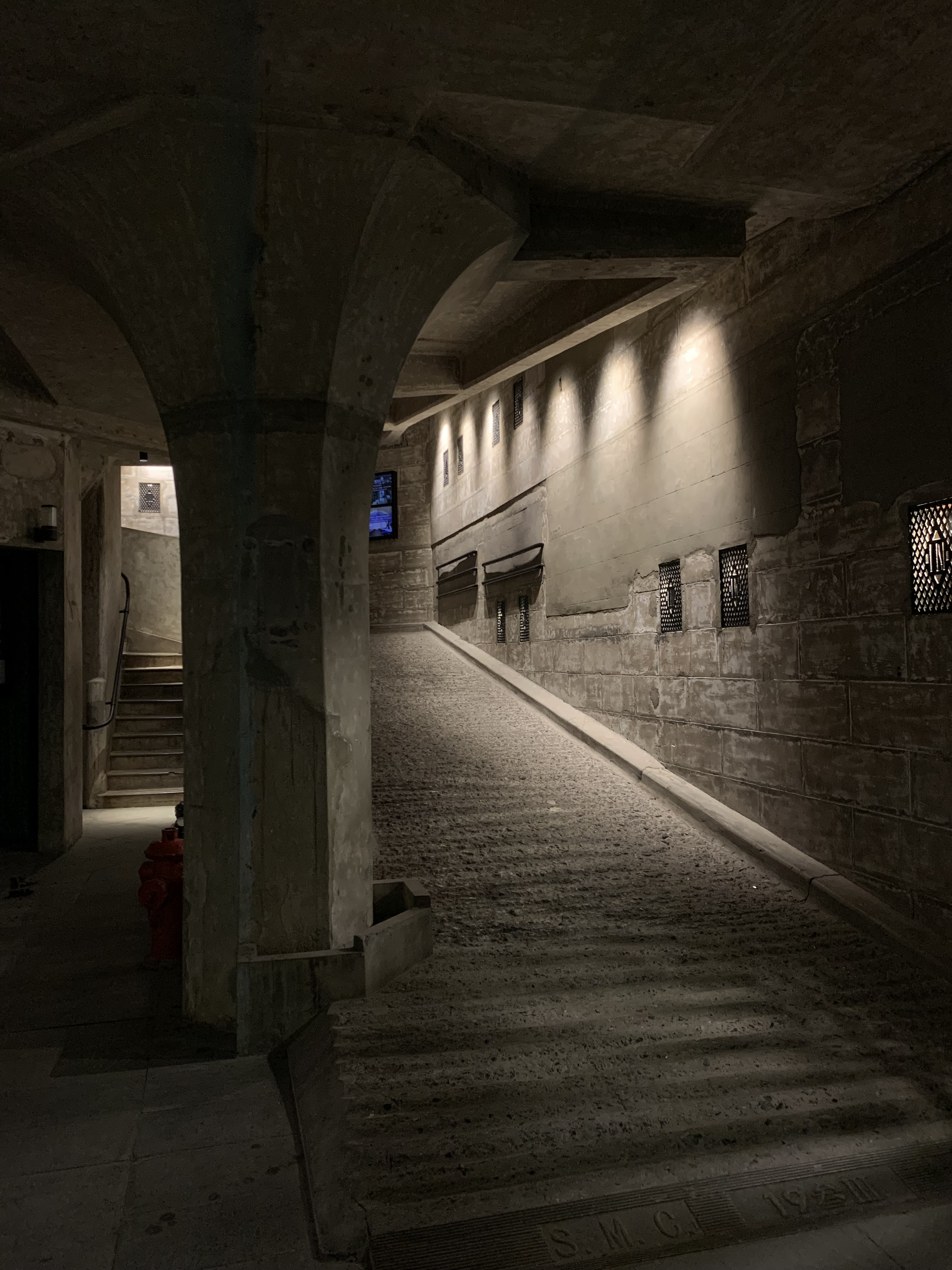
Interior at night

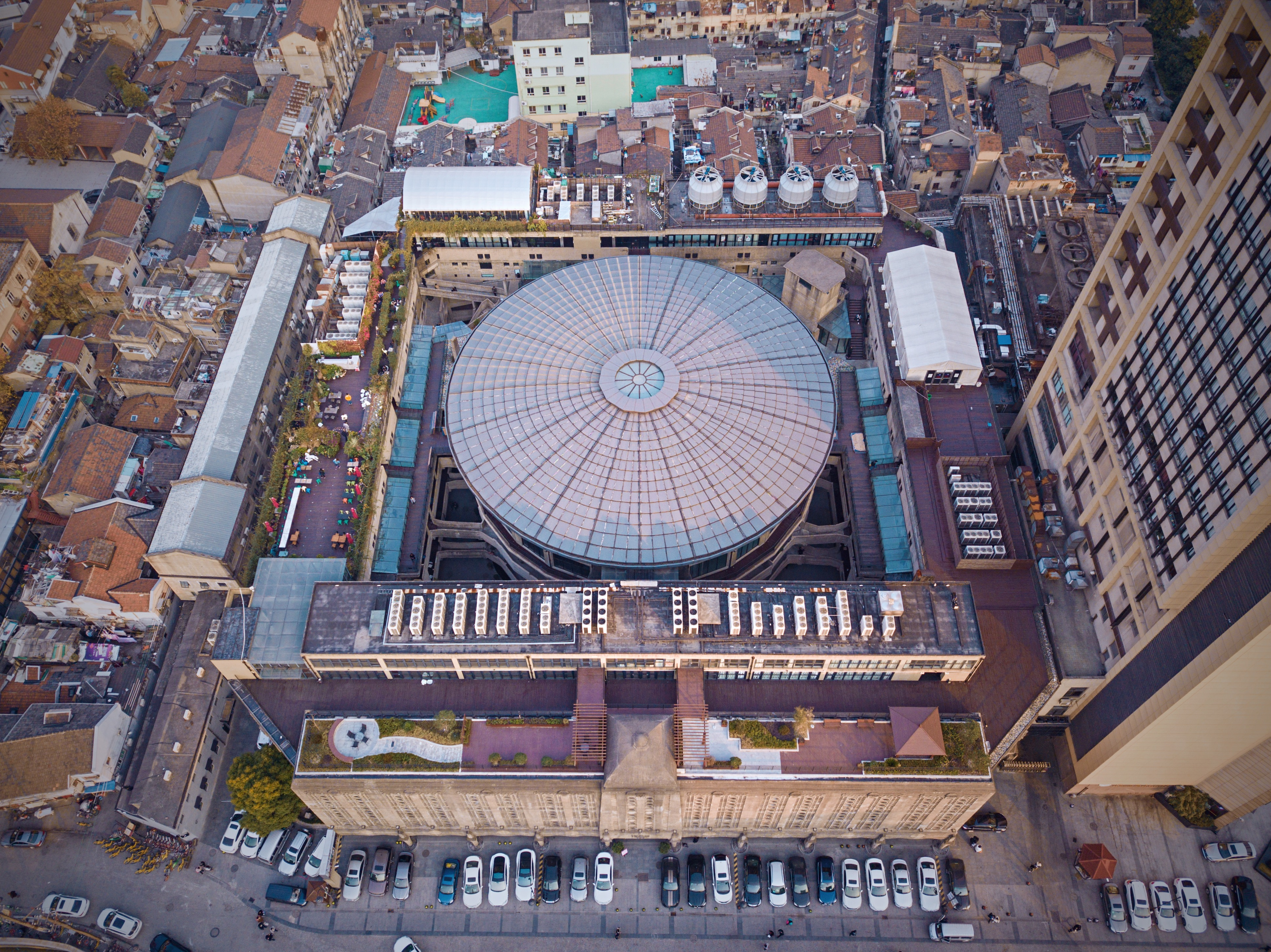
Aerial view of the complex

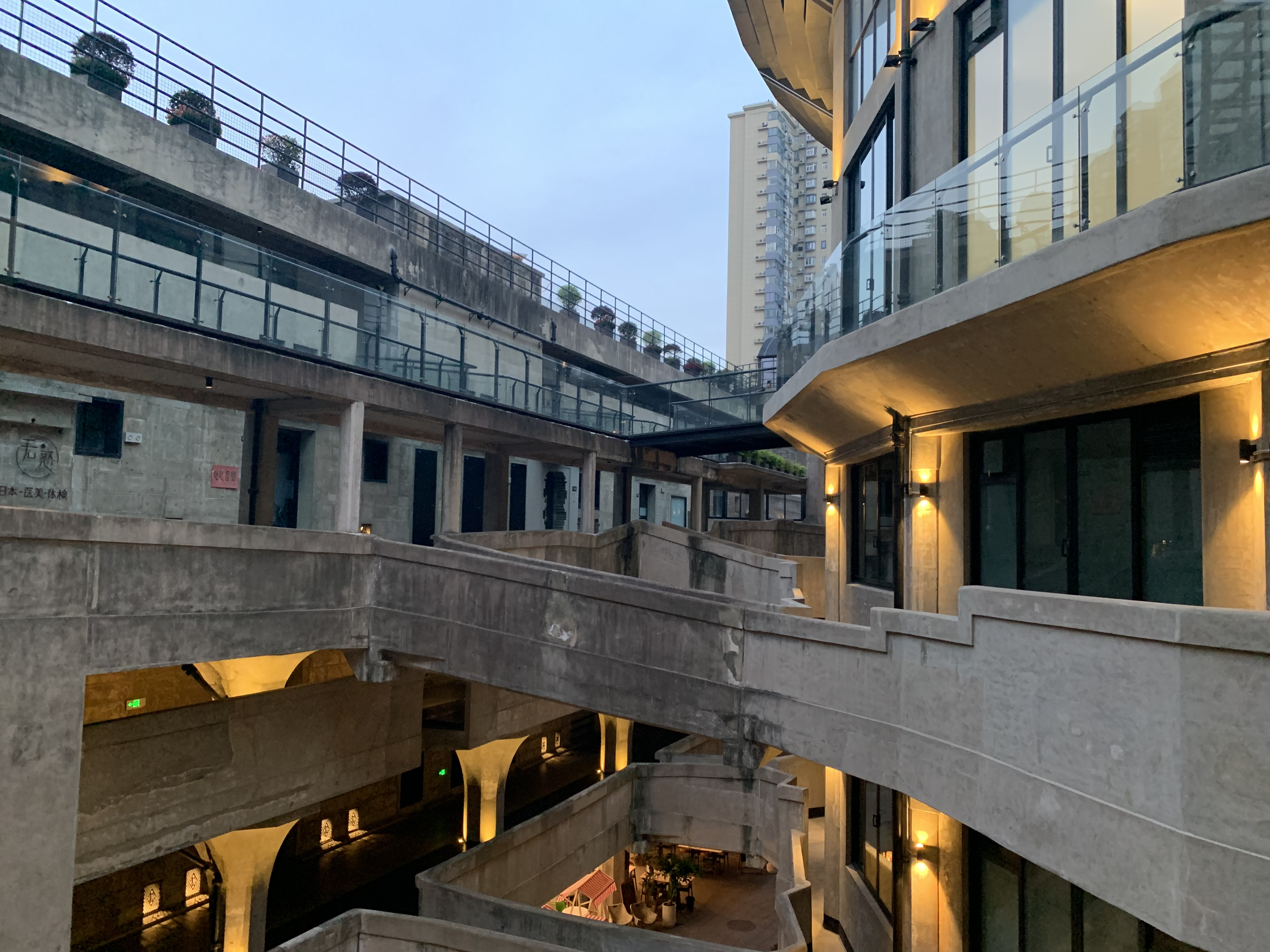
The second-to-top floor of the building

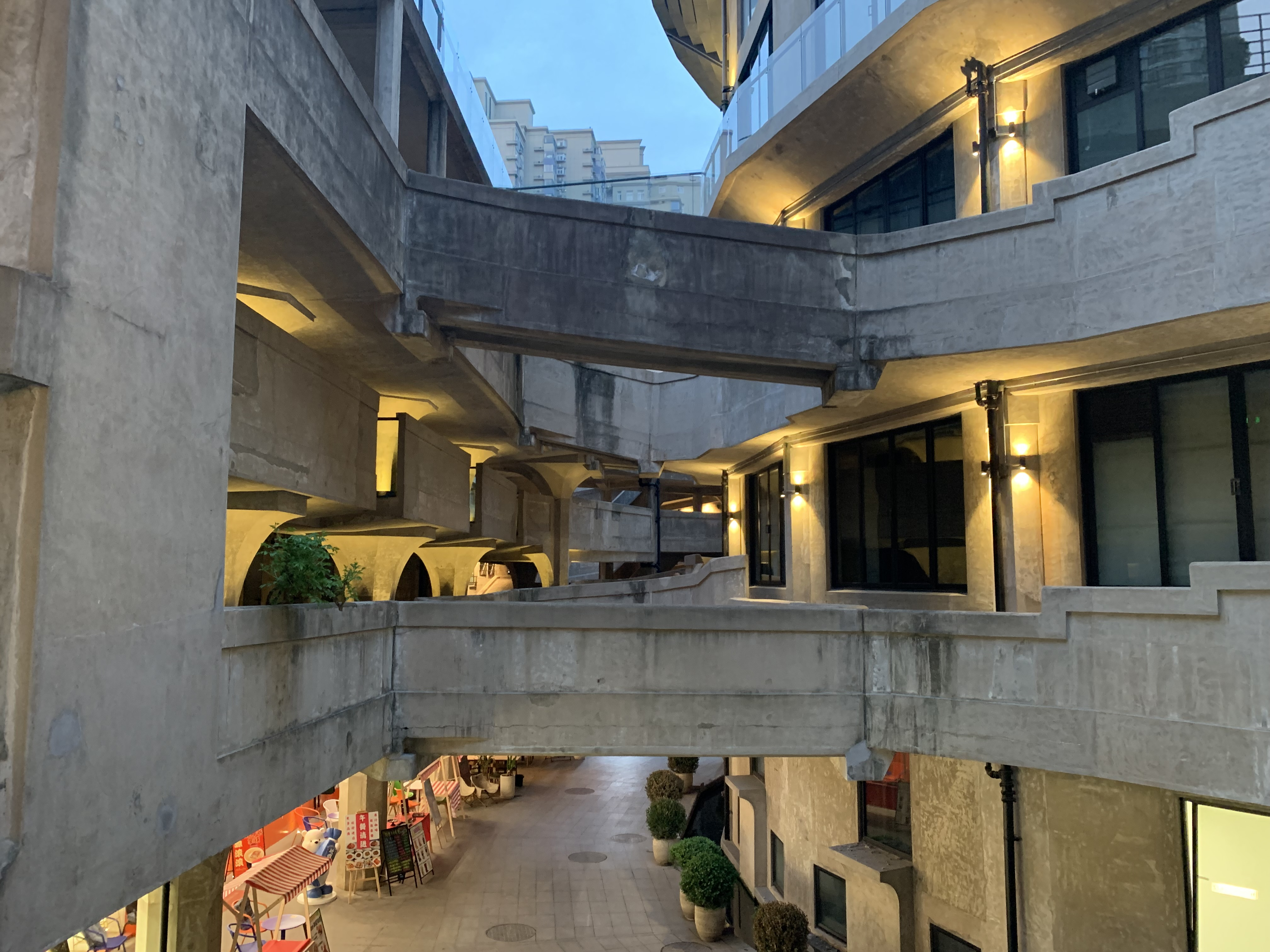
Linking walkways

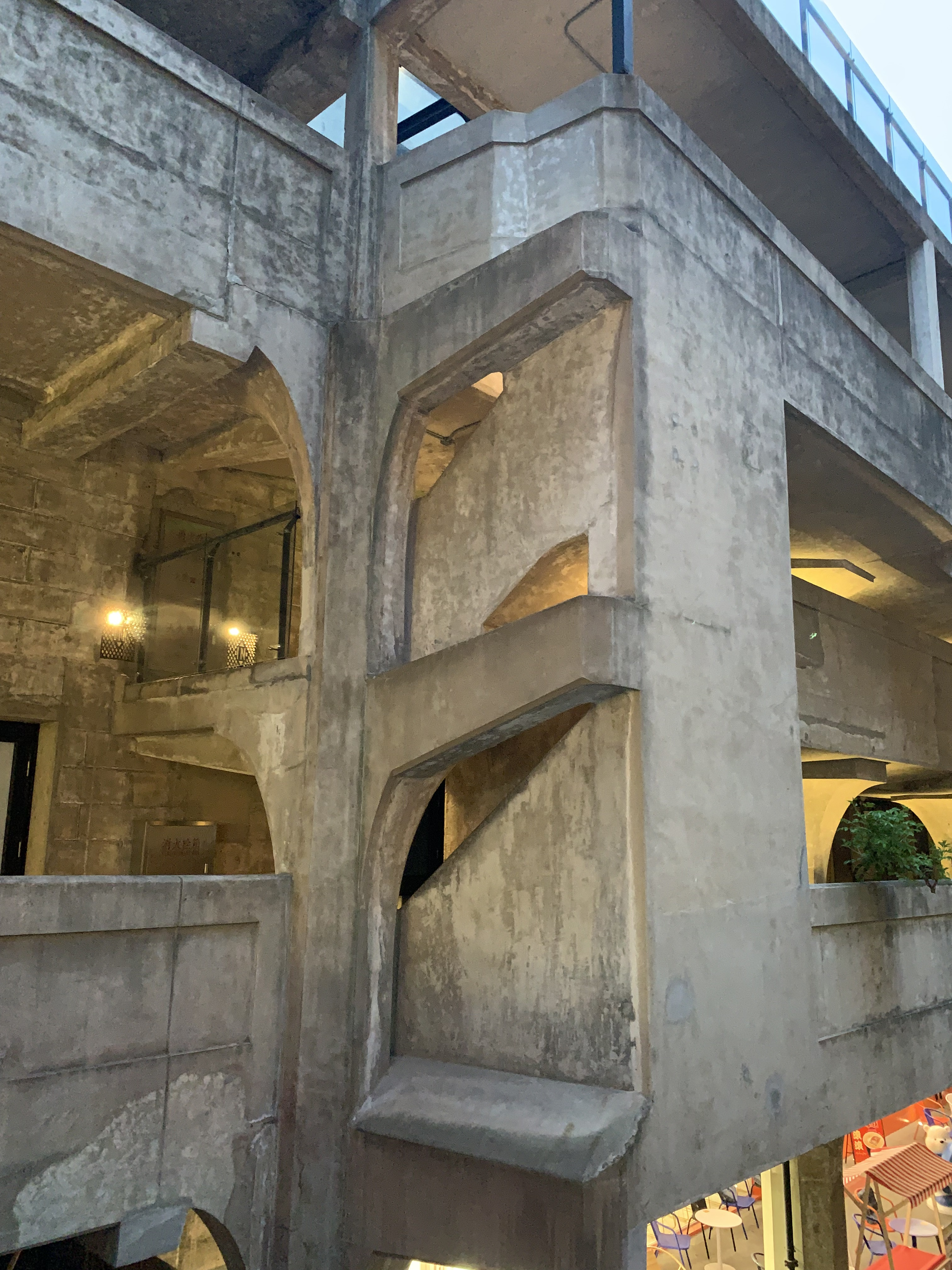
Stairs

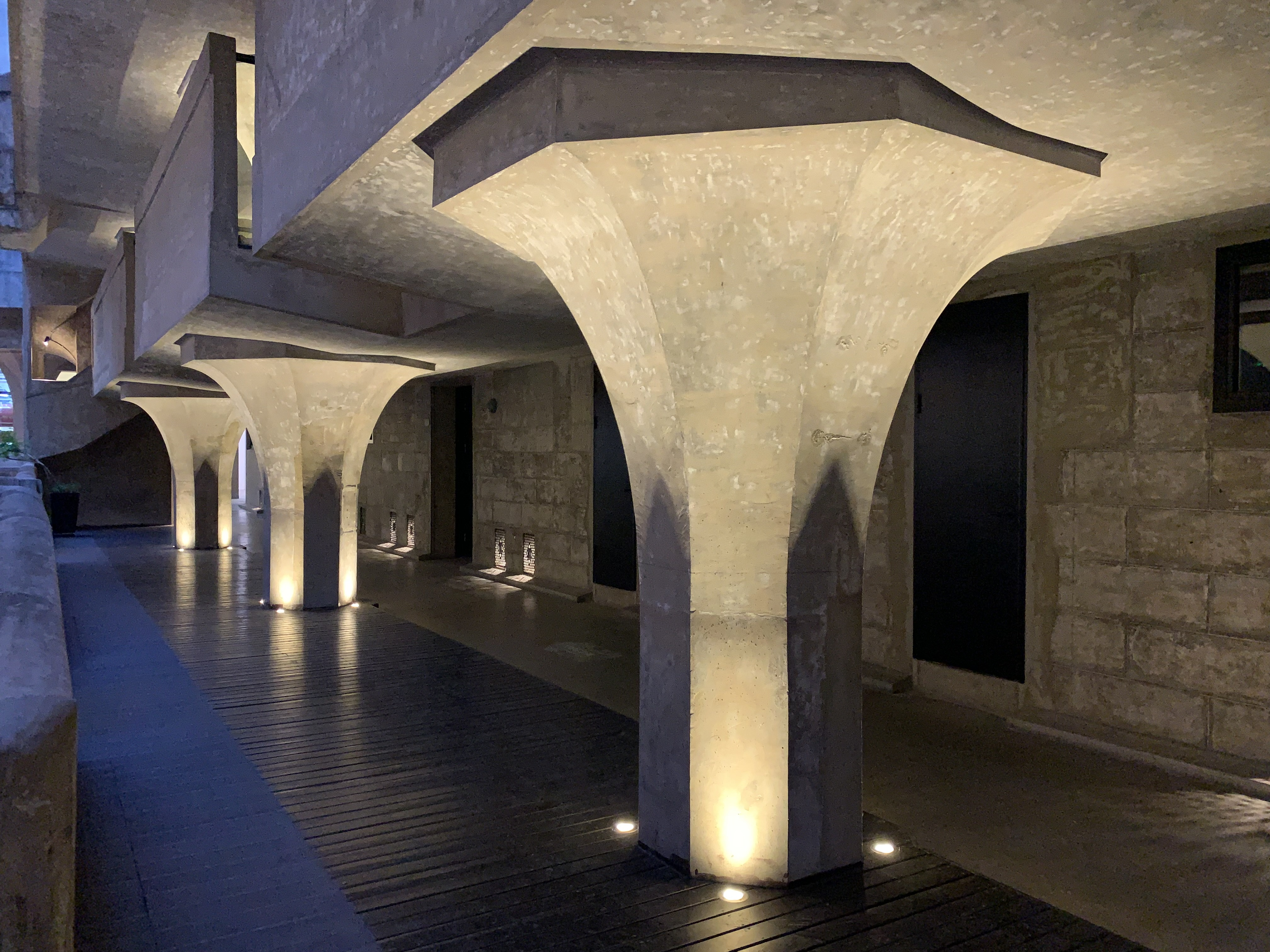
Column design in the building's interior

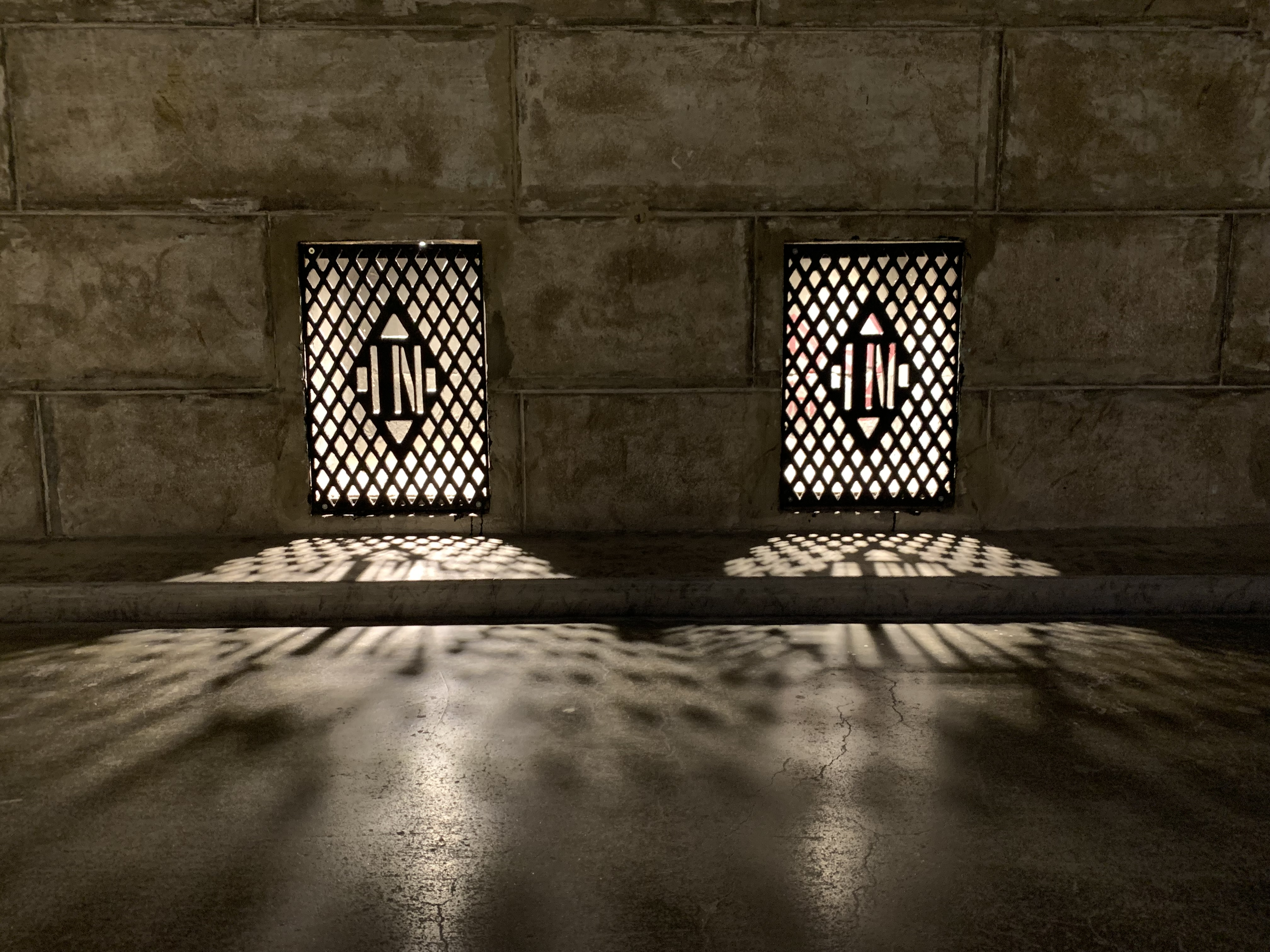
Floor lights

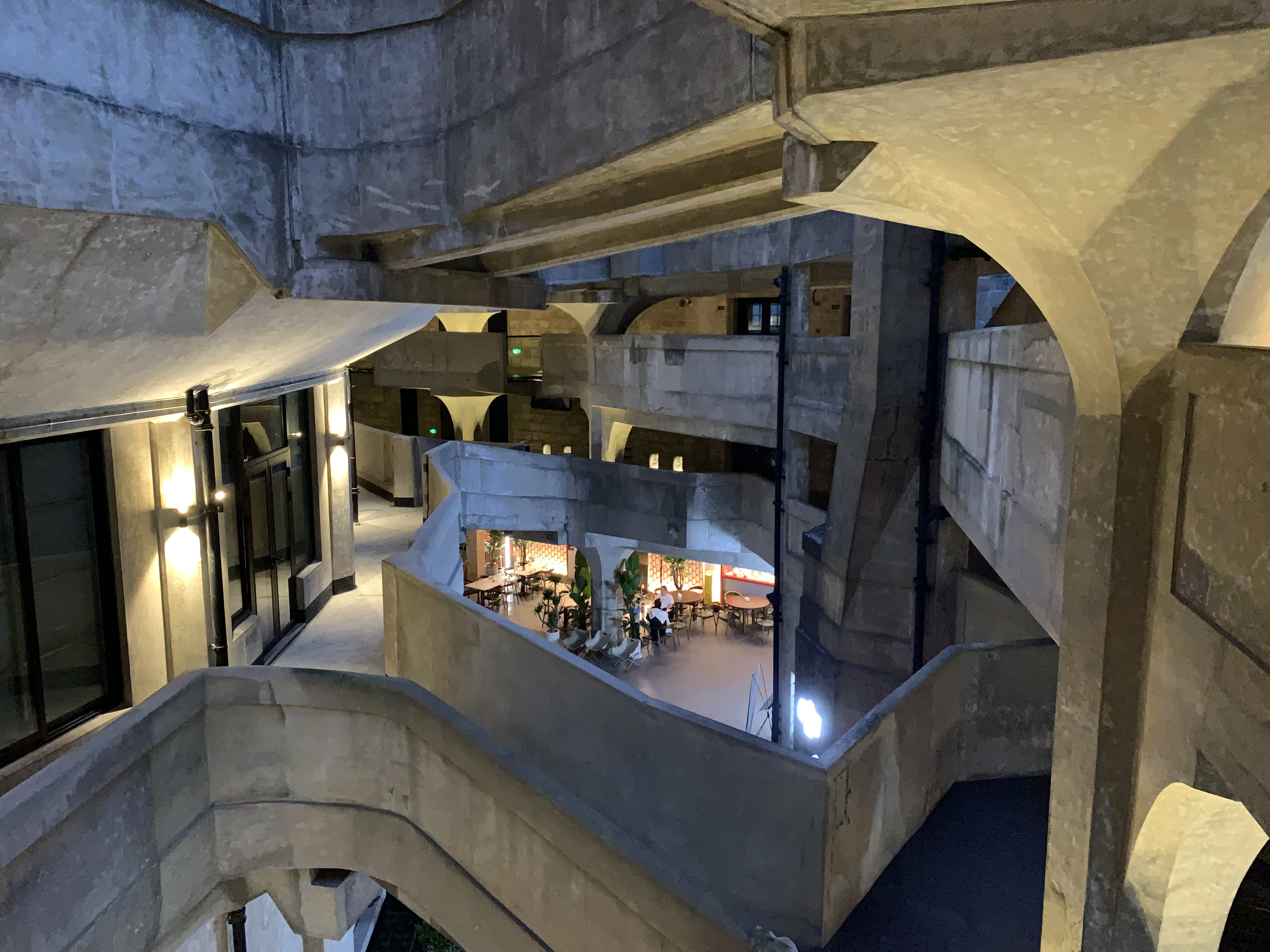
View looking toward the ground floor

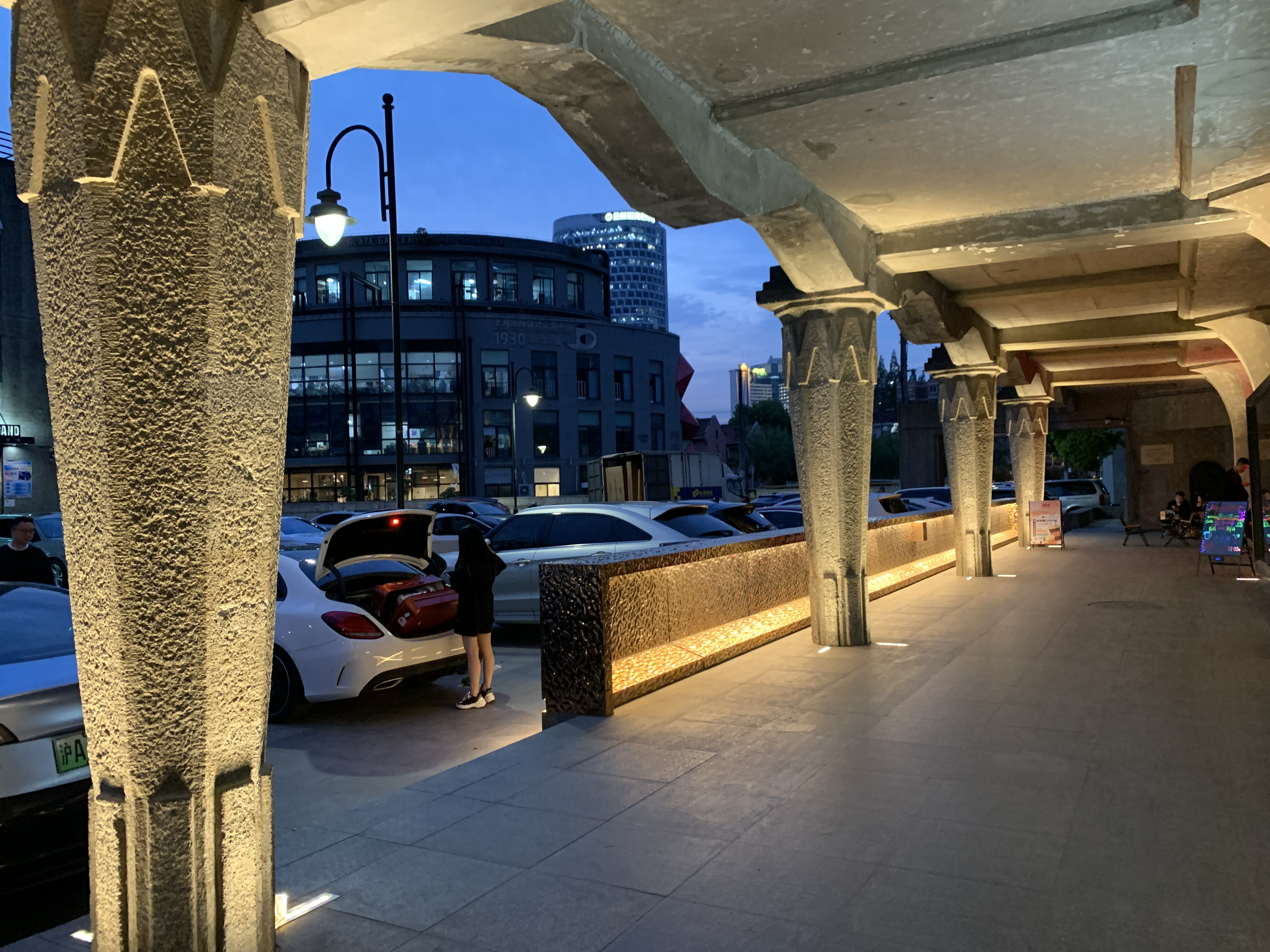
Column design at the building's entrance on the ground floor
