= Zhongxing Road station (Shanghai Metro) =

Shanghai Metro station

Zhongxing Road 中兴路
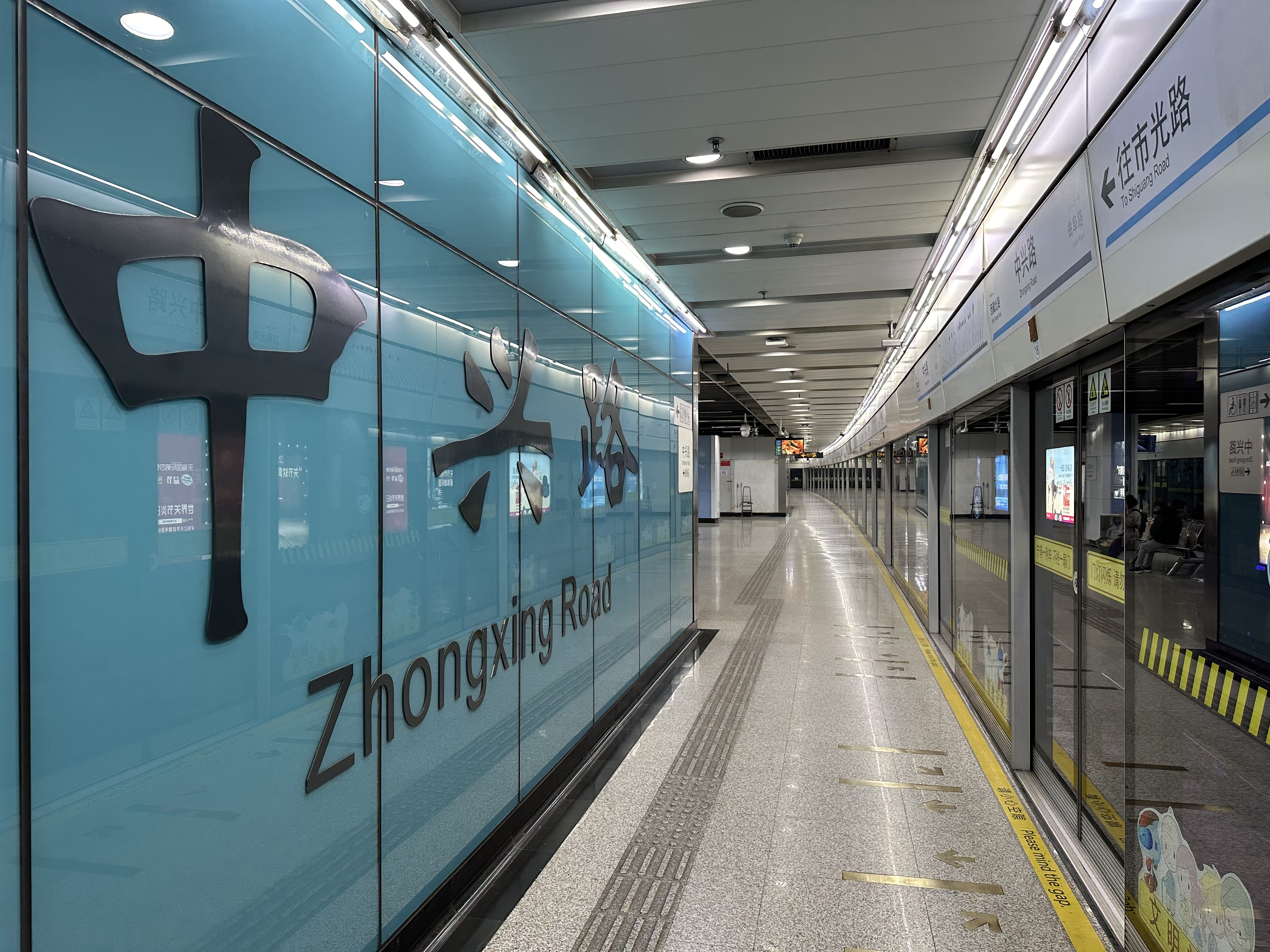
- Station platform

General information
- Location: Shanghai; China
- Coordinates: 31.2553°N 121.464°E
- Operated by: Shanghai No. 4 Metro Operation Co. Ltd.
- Line: Line 8
- Platforms: 2 (1 island platform)
- Tracks: 2

Construction
- Structure type: Underground
- Accessible: Yes

History
- Opened: December 29, 2007

Services
Preceding station	Shanghai Metro	Following station
North Xizang Road towards Shiguang Road	Line 8	Qufu Road towards Shendu Highway
Location

Zhongxing Road (Chinese: 中兴路; pinyin: Zhōngxīng Lù) is the name of a station on Shanghai Metro Line 8. It began operation on 29 December 2007. Lines 3 and 4 pass by without stopping.
