= North Xizang Road station =

Shanghai Metro station

North Xizang Road 西藏北路
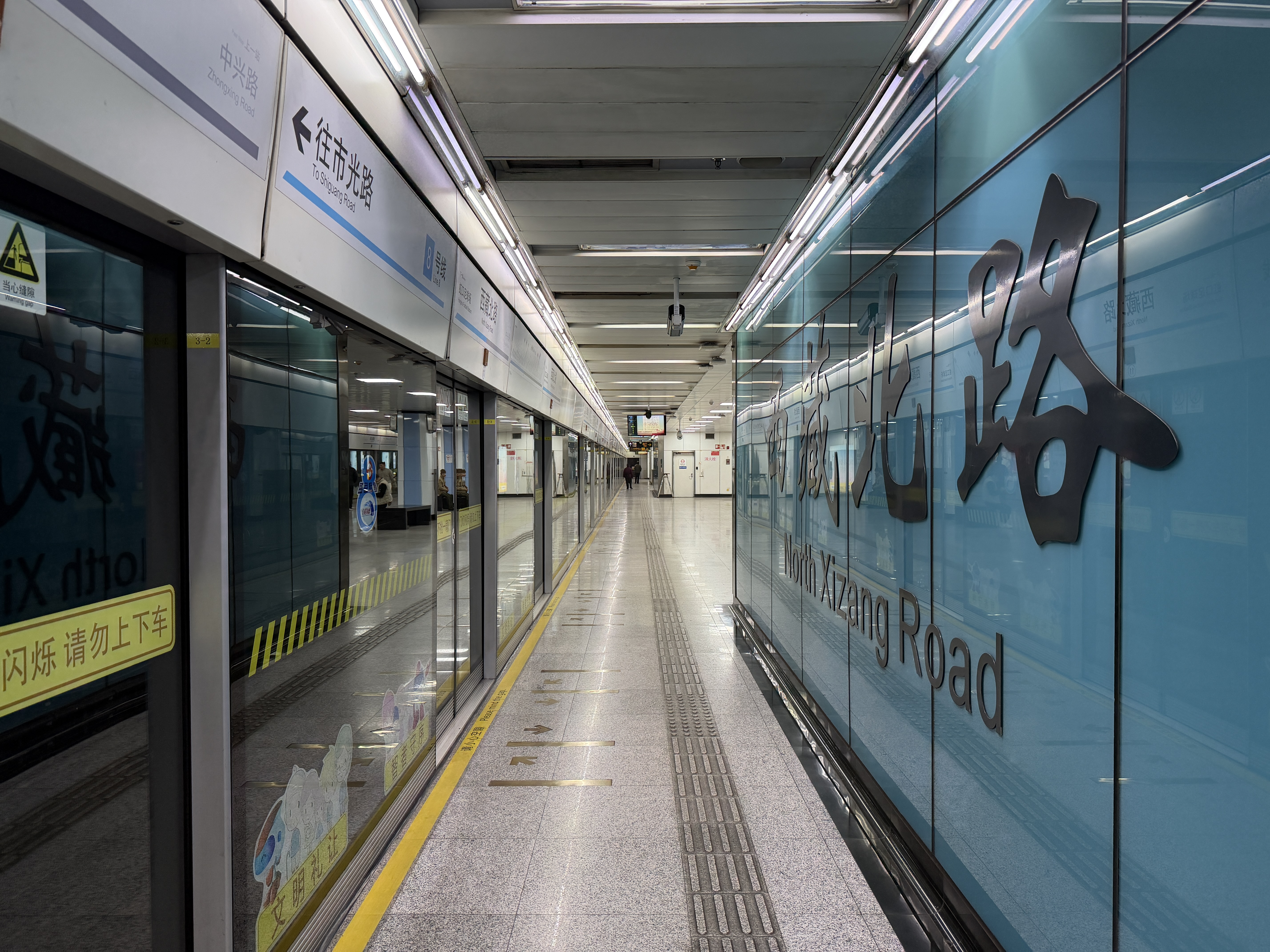
- Station platform

General information
- Location: Shanghai; China
- Coordinates: 31.2675°N 121.467°E
- Operated by: Shanghai No. 4 Metro Operation Co. Ltd.
- Line: Line 8
- Platforms: 2 (1 island platform)
- Tracks: 2

Construction
- Structure type: Underground
- Accessible: Yes

History
- Opened: December 29, 2007

Services
Preceding station	Shanghai Metro	Following station
Hongkou Football Stadium towards Shiguang Road	Line 8	Zhongxing Road towards Shendu Highway
Location

North Xizang Road (Chinese: 西藏北路; pinyin: Xīzàng Běi Lù) is a Light rail station Shanghai Metro Line 8. It began operation on December 29, 2007.
