= Chinesisch-Deutsches Hochschulkolleg =

University college in Shanghai, China

- 中德学院
- Type: Private university
- Established: 1998
- Affiliations: Tongji University
- President: Pei Gang
- Students: 320
- Location: Shanghai, China
- Website: CDHK Official website

Chinesisch-Deutsches Hochschulkolleg
- Simplified Chinese: 中德学院
- Traditional Chinese: 中德學院
Transcriptions
Standard Mandarin
- Hanyu Pinyin: Zhōng dé xuéyuàn

Chinesisch-Deutsches Hochschulkolleg (中德学院) is the Chinese German College for Postgraduate Studies affiliated with Tongji University located in Shanghai, China.

== History ==
The idea to combine educational activities in a joint Chinese-German university college for postgraduate studies dates back to the visit of former German chancellor Dr. Helmut Kohl in November 1993. Negotiations between China and Germany started in 1994, and in the following year the German Academic Exchange Service (DAAD) was assigned the realization of this project.

The Shanghai "Chinesisch-Deutsches Hochschulkolleg" or CDHK, as the college for postgraduate studies is called for short, was finally opened in February 1998. On October 7, 2002, the college moved into new modern building in Chifeng Lu.

== Objectives ==
As an institute at Tongji University, the CDHK today offers bilingual master studies in the following fields:

- electrical engineering (automation, information technology)
- mechanical engineering (production engineering, automotive engineering)
- economics (supply chain management, marketing, financial management, economic law, actuarial science)

According to German educational standards, the curriculum is oriented towards broad knowledge and practical experience. Thus, the CDHK is able to train junior staff with both leadership qualities and experience in two cultures for the benefit of Chinese and German companies in China.

== Course of studies ==
The postgraduate studies at CDHK take three years and start with intensive German language training in the first semester. From the second to the third semester students proceed their language studies in addition to their respective field studies and will attend a language test. As an end of the German language training course, all the students are obliged to take a middle-level German test and received a German language certificate issued by German College of Tongji University.

The students attend classes of Chinese professors who themselves have studied in Germany for a considerable time or finished their PhD at a German university. Moreover, each semester CDHK invites German tutors for one or two weeks to hold German language lectures in their respective fields. Basically all the courses are co-conducted by Chinese and German Professors.

=== Double Masters Program ===
In the fourth semester students have the chance to go to Germany for an internship in a company and/or study at one of its partner universities. In the later case, students must have passed TestDAF, a German language test, with at least a score of 16 (on a 20 scale). In electro technics there even is the chance to prepare for an international final degree at the Technical University of Munich, the so-called "double master" program. In the year of 2008, this "double master" program was extended to the students of mechanical engineering with the partner university of Ruhr-University Bochum This program is sponsored partially by DAAD. Several graduates already work on their PhD either in Germany or China.

== Perspectives ==
The Chinese-German College for Postgraduate Studies is sponsored by Tongji-University and the DAAD as well as by numerous companies that have among others donated eighteen chairs and support the project by presentation, visits and contacts. It is the first educational joint-venture of this dimension, enjoying the support of both governments, and has the advantage of the close cooperation with its entrepreneurial sponsors.

== Partner Universities ==
- RWTH Aachen University
- Technische Universität Berlin
- Ruhr University Bochum
- Technische Universität Darmstadt
- Goethe Business School, Frankfurt
- Kühne Logistics University, Hamburg
- Bucerius Law School, Hamburg
- Karlsruhe Institute of Technology
- University of Mainz
- University of Mannheim
- LMU Munich
- Technical University of Munich
- University of the Bundeswehr Munich
- University of Münster
- European Business School, Oestrich-Winkel
- University of St. Gallen
- WHU – Otto Beisheim School of Management, Vallendar
