= Quyang Road station =

Shanghai Metro station

Quyang Road 曲阳路
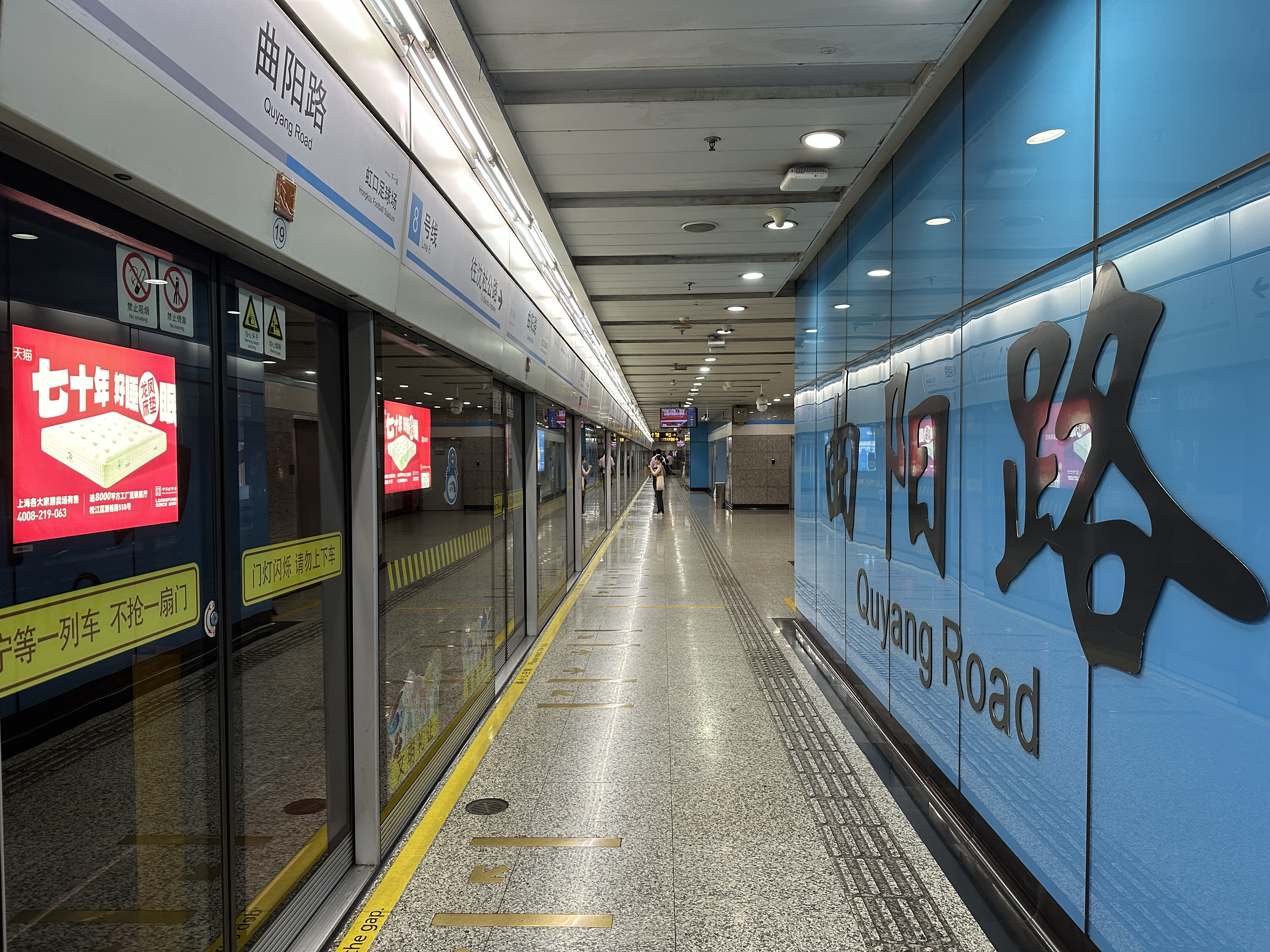
- Station platform, Shendu Highway-bound side

General information
- Location: Shanghai; China
- Coordinates: 31.2781°N 121.485°E
- Operated by: Shanghai No. 4 Metro Operation Co. Ltd.
- Line: Line 8
- Platforms: 2 (2 side platforms)
- Tracks: 2

Construction
- Structure type: Underground
- Accessible: Yes

History
- Opened: December 29, 2007

Services
Preceding station	Shanghai Metro	Following station
Siping Road towards Shiguang Road	Line 8	Hongkou Football Stadium towards Shendu Highway
Location

Quyang Road (Chinese: 曲阳路; pinyin: Qǔyáng Lù) is a station on Shanghai Metro Line 8. It began operation on December 29, 2007.
