= Chifeng Road station =

Shanghai Metro station

Chifeng Road 赤峰路
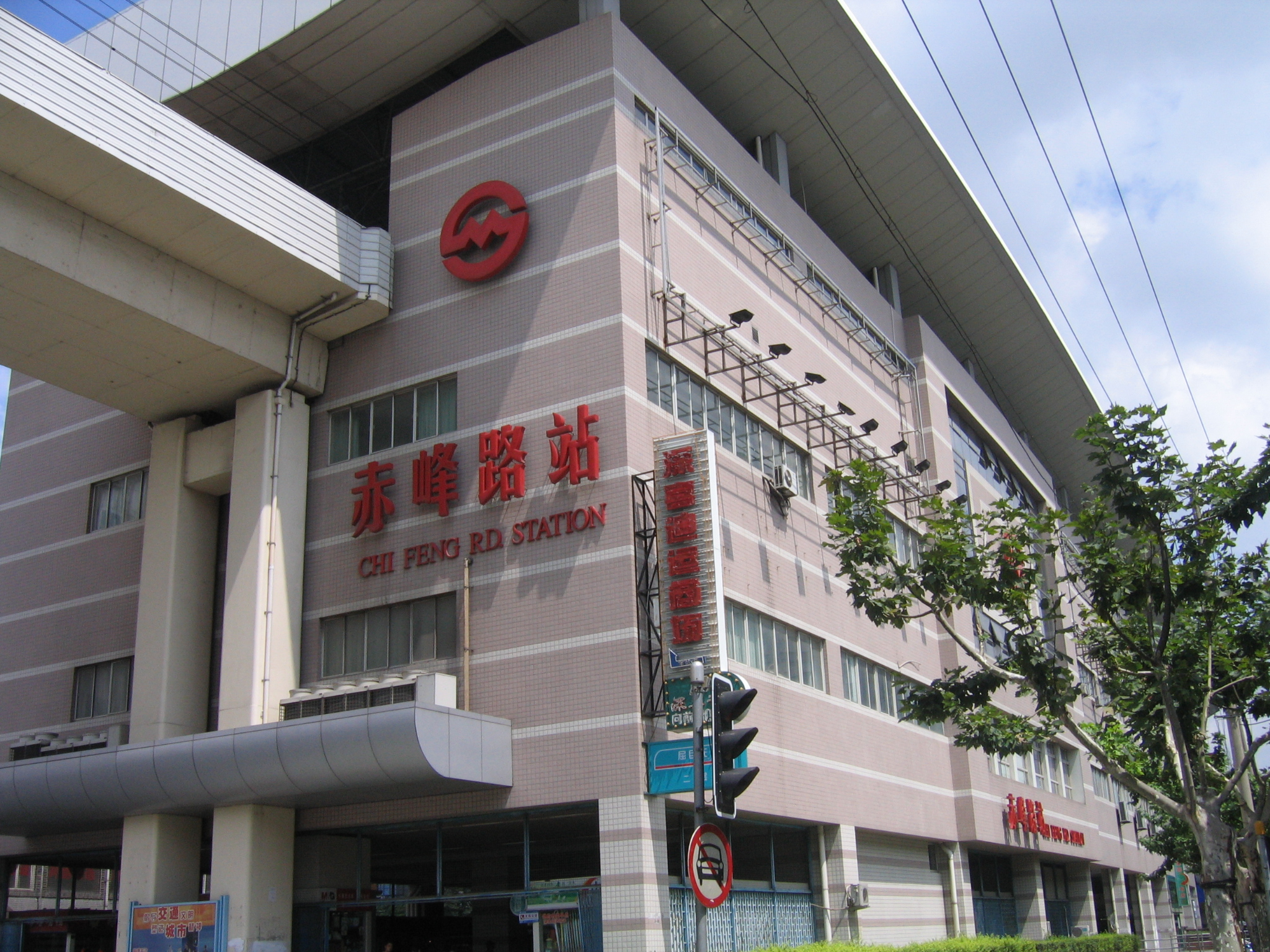
- Station exterior

General information
- Location: Zhongshan North First Road (中山北一路) and Chifeng Road; Hongkou District, Shanghai; China
- Coordinates: 31°16′52″N 121°28′57″E
- Operator: Shanghai No. 3 Metro Operation Co. Ltd.
- Line: Line 3
- Platforms: 2 (2 side platforms)
- Tracks: 2

Construction
- Structure type: Elevated
- Accessible: Yes

History
- Opened: 26 December 2000; 25 years ago

Services
Preceding station	Shanghai Metro	Following station
Dabaishu towards North Jiangyang Road	Line 3	Hongkou Football Stadium towards Shanghai South Railway Station
Location
- Location within Shanghai

Chifeng Road (Chinese: 赤峰路; pinyin: Chìfēng Lù) is a station on Shanghai Metro Line 3. The station opened on 26 December 2000 as part of the initial section of Line 3 from Shanghai South Railway Station to Jiangwan Town.
