= Yuanshen =

Yuanshen could refer to:

== Places ==
- Yuanshen Sports Centre Stadium, a multi-purpose stadium in Shanghai
- Yuanshen Stadium station, a station on Line 6 of the Shanghai Metro
- Yuanshen Road station, a station under construction on the future Line 14 of the Shanghai Metro

== Other uses ==
- Genshin Impact (Chinese: 原神; pinyin: Yuánshén), a video game developed by HoYoverse. (formerly known as: miHoYo)
- yuanshen (Chinese: 元神), one of the "three origins" in Chinese traditional medicine
- Yuan-Shih Chow (Chinese: 周元燊, Pinyin: Zhōu Yuánshēn), a Chinese-American probabilist
