= Yangshupu Road station =

Shanghai Metro station

Yangshupu Road 杨树浦路
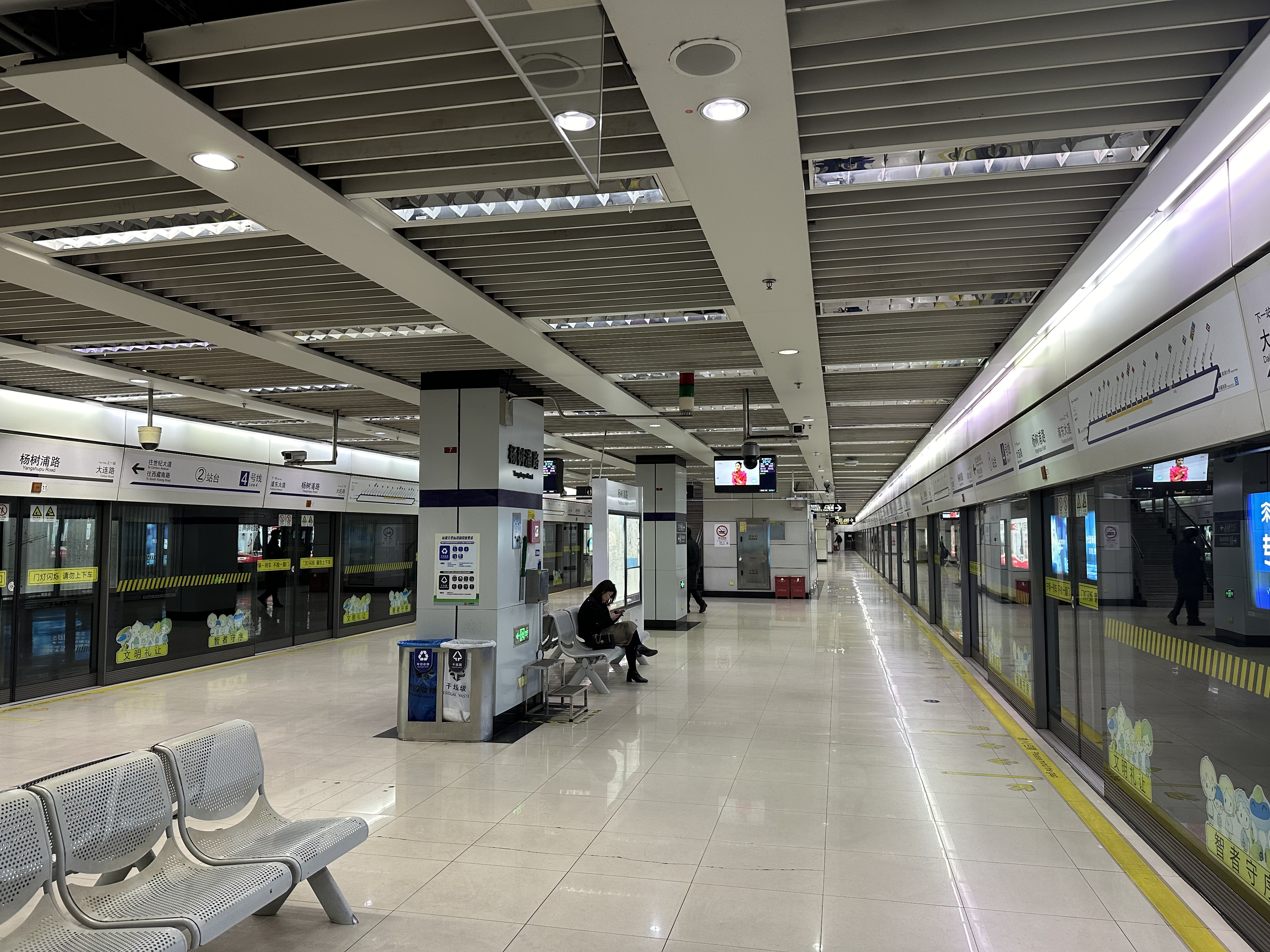

General information
- Location: Dalian Road and Yangshupu Road; Yangpu District, Shanghai; China
- Coordinates: 31°15′06″N 121°31′04″E
- Operator: Shanghai No. 3 Metro Operation Co. Ltd.
- Line: Line 4
- Platforms: 2 (1 island platform)
- Tracks: 2

Construction
- Structure type: Underground
- Accessible: Yes

History
- Opened: 31 December 2005; 20 years ago

Services
Preceding station	Shanghai Metro	Following station
Pudong Avenue Clockwise	Line 4	Dalian Road Counter-clockwise
Location
- Location within Shanghai

Yangshupu Road (simplified Chinese: 杨树浦路; traditional Chinese: 楊樹浦路; pinyin: Yángshùpǔ Lù) is a station on Shanghai Metro Line 4. It is located along Dalian Road (大连路) at its intersection with Yangshupu Road, in the Yangpu District of Shanghai, and is the first station on Line 4 in Puxi travelling counter-clockwise after crossing the Huangpu River from Pudong. Service began at this station on 31 December 2005.

== Nearby places ==
- Jingxing Road Mosque
