= Pudong Avenue station =

Shanghai Metro station

Pudong Avenue 浦东大道
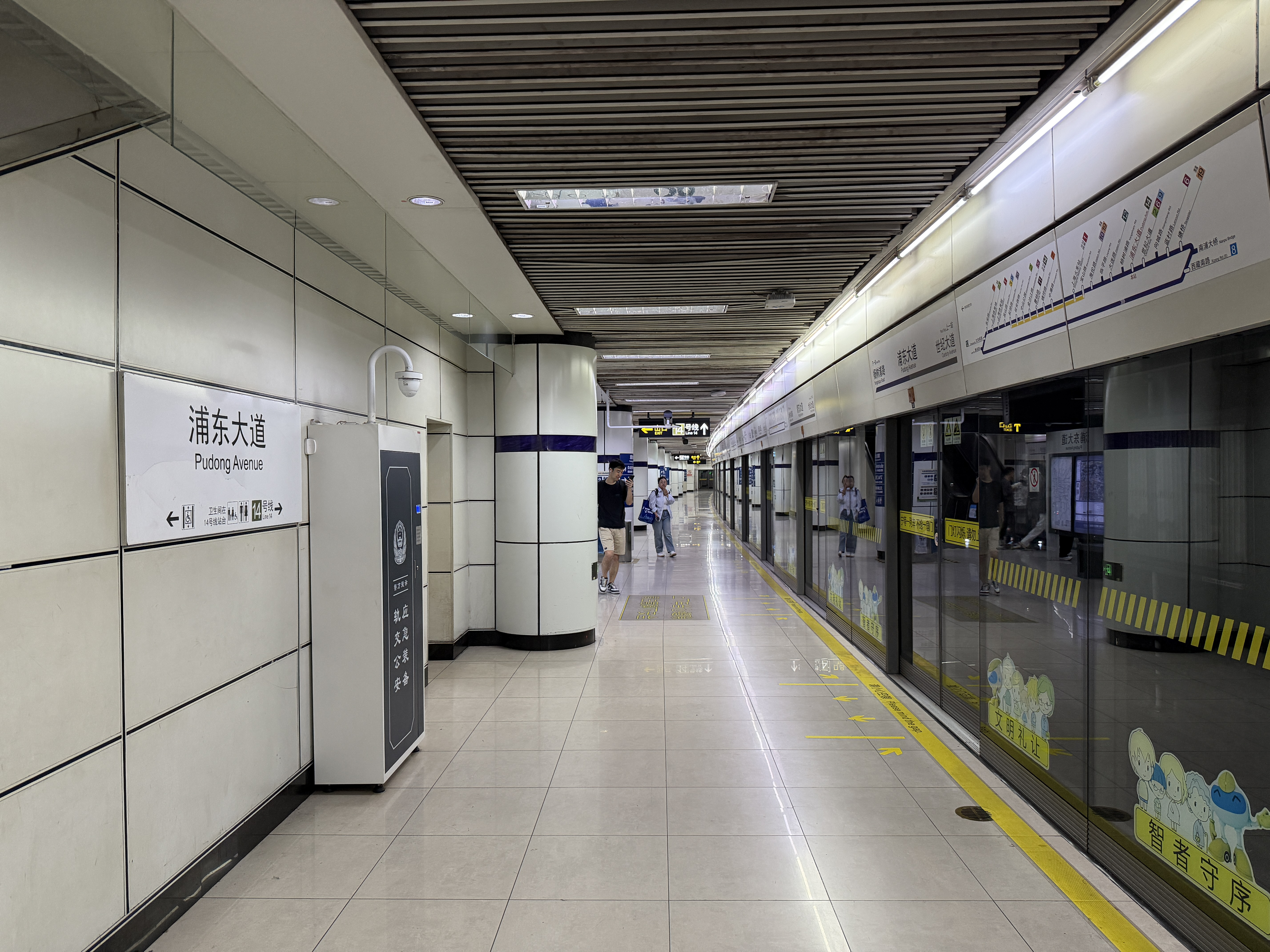
- Station platform on Line 4

General information
- Location: Dongfang Road and Pudong Avenue; Pudong, Shanghai; China
- Coordinates: 31°14′24″N 121°31′10″E
- Operator: Shanghai No. 3 Metro Operation Co. Ltd.
- Lines: Line 4; Line 14
- Platforms: 4 (2 island platforms)
- Tracks: 4

Construction
- Structure type: Underground
- Accessible: Yes

History
- Opened: 31 December 2005; 20 years ago (Line 4); 30 December 2021; 4 years ago (Line 14)

Services
Preceding station	Shanghai Metro	Following station
Century Avenue Clockwise	Line 4	Yangshupu Road Counter-clockwise
South Pudong Road towards Fengbang	Line 14	Yuanshen Road towards Guiqiao Road
Location
- Location within Shanghai

Pudong Avenue (simplified Chinese: 浦东大道; traditional Chinese: 浦東大道; pinyin: Pǔdōng Dàdào) is the name of a station on Line 4 and Line 14 of the Shanghai Metro. It is the first station on Line 4 in Pudong travelling clockwise after crossing the Huangpu River from Puxi. Service began at this station on 31 December 2005. It later became an interchange station on 30 December 2021 after the opening of Line 14.

== Station Layout ==
G	Entrances and Exits	Exits 1-8
B1	Line 4 & 14 Concourse (For Exits 1-6)	Faregates, Station Agent
B2	Line 14 Concourse (For Exits 7 & 8)	Faregates, Station Agent
B2	Counterclockwise	← Line 4 to Yangshupu Road
B2	Island platform, doors open on the left
B2	Clockwise	Line 4 to Century Avenue →
B2	Westbound	← Line 14 towards Fengbang (South Pudong Road)
B2	Island platform, doors open on the left
B2	Eastbound	Line 14 towards Guiqiao Road (Yuanshen Road) →

== Gallery ==
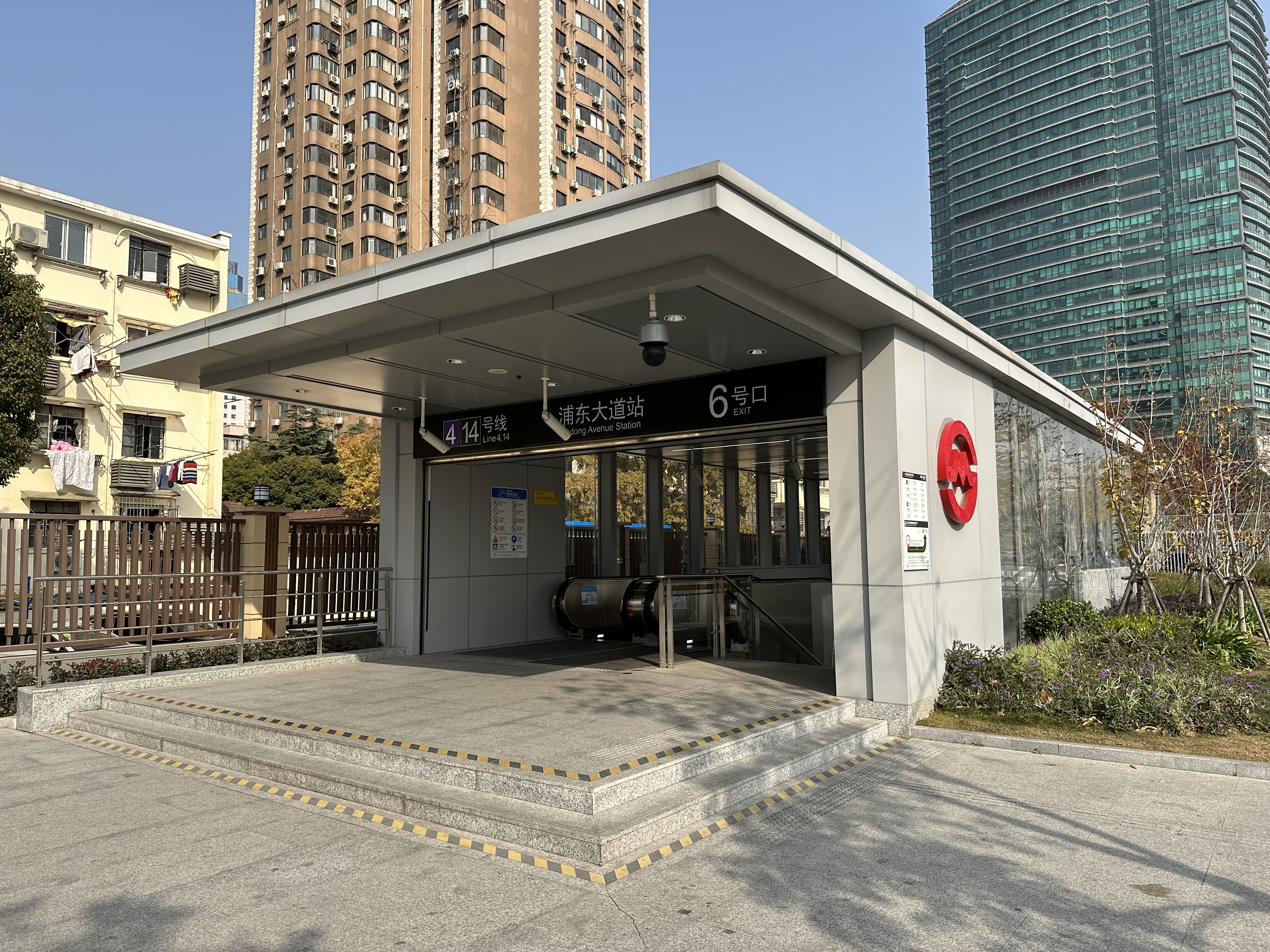
Exit 6

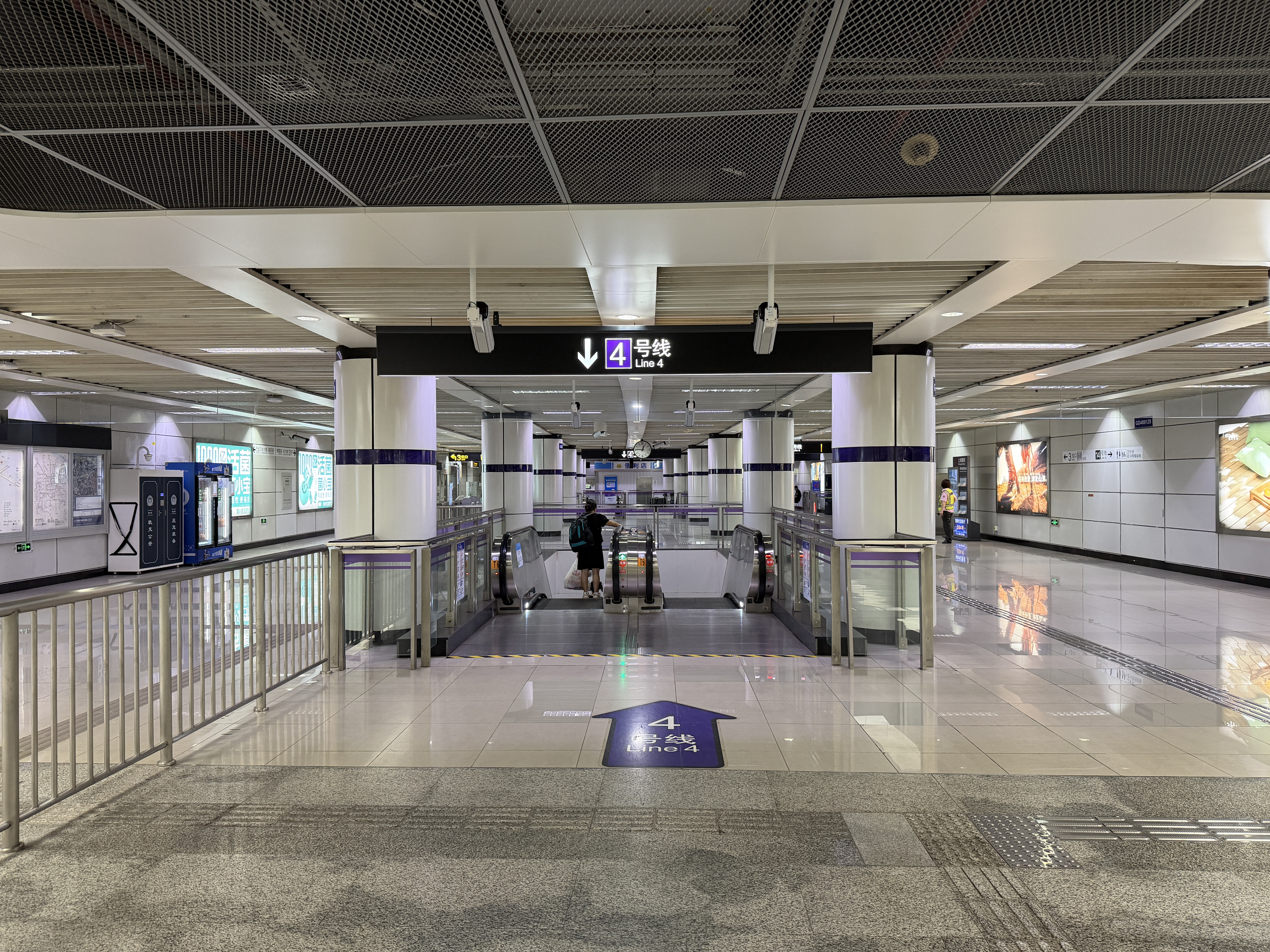
Line 4 concourse

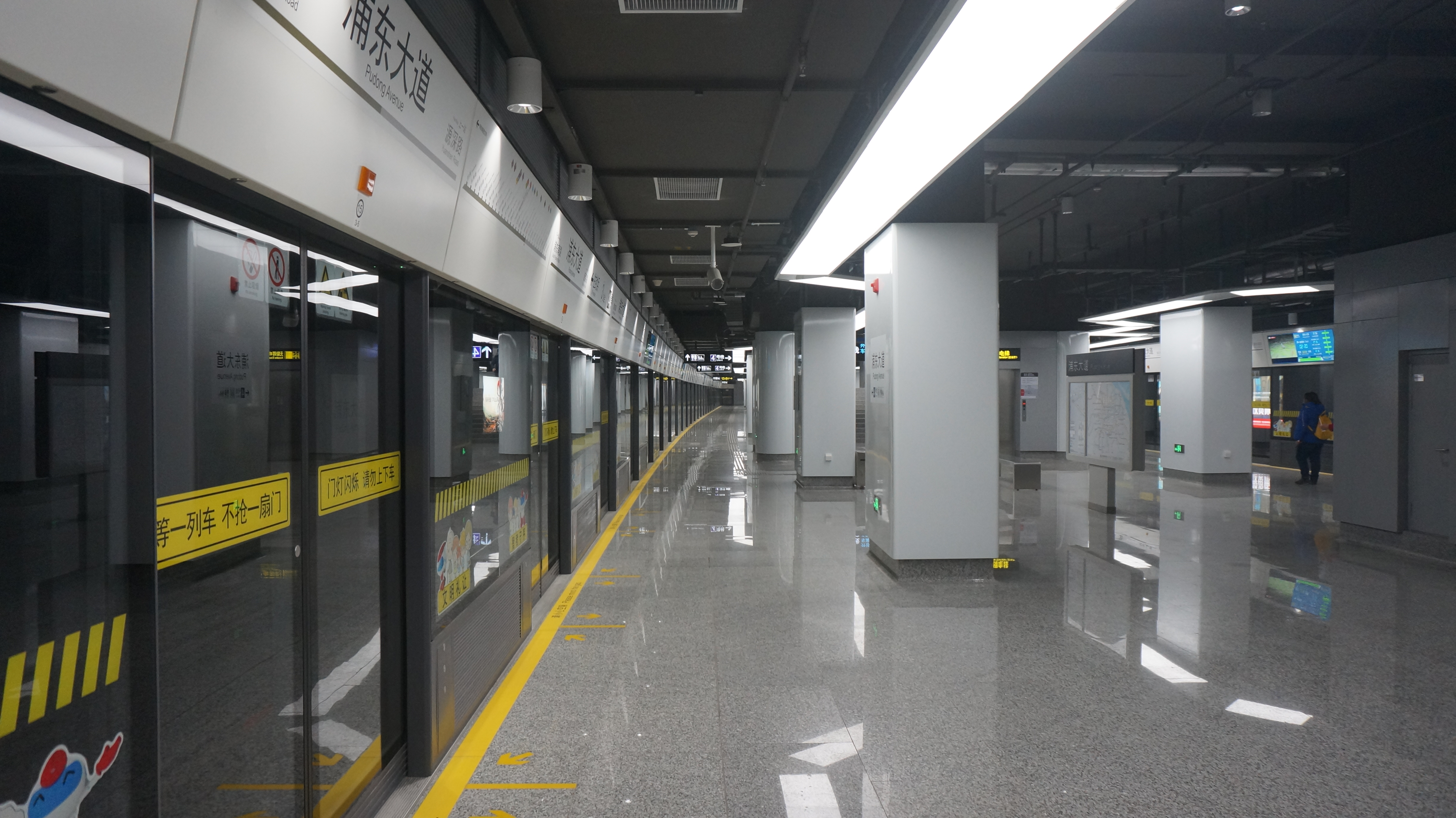
Line 14 platform

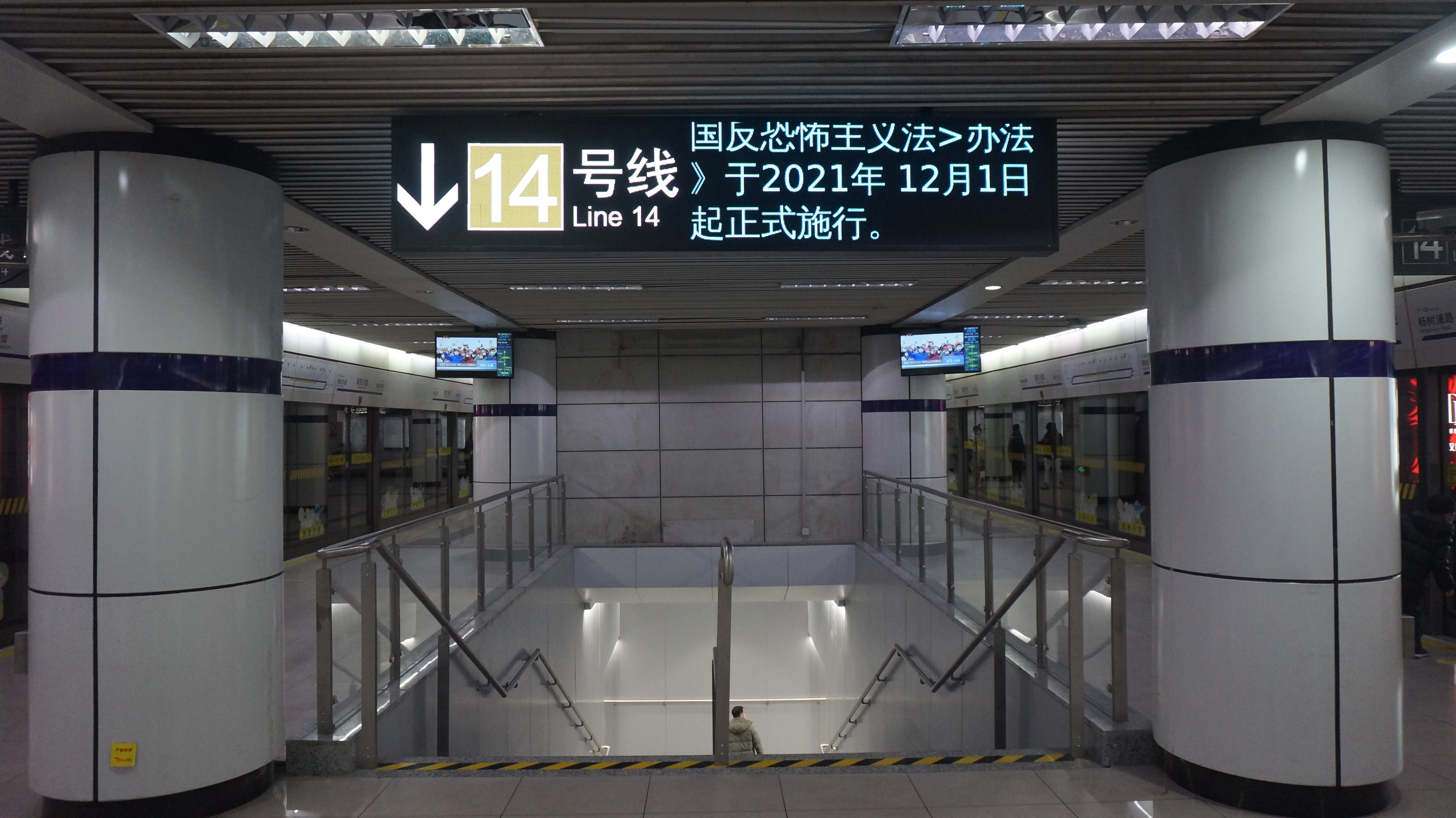
Line 4 Transfer Node to Line 14
