= Line 4 (Shanghai Metro) =

Metro line of the Shanghai Metro

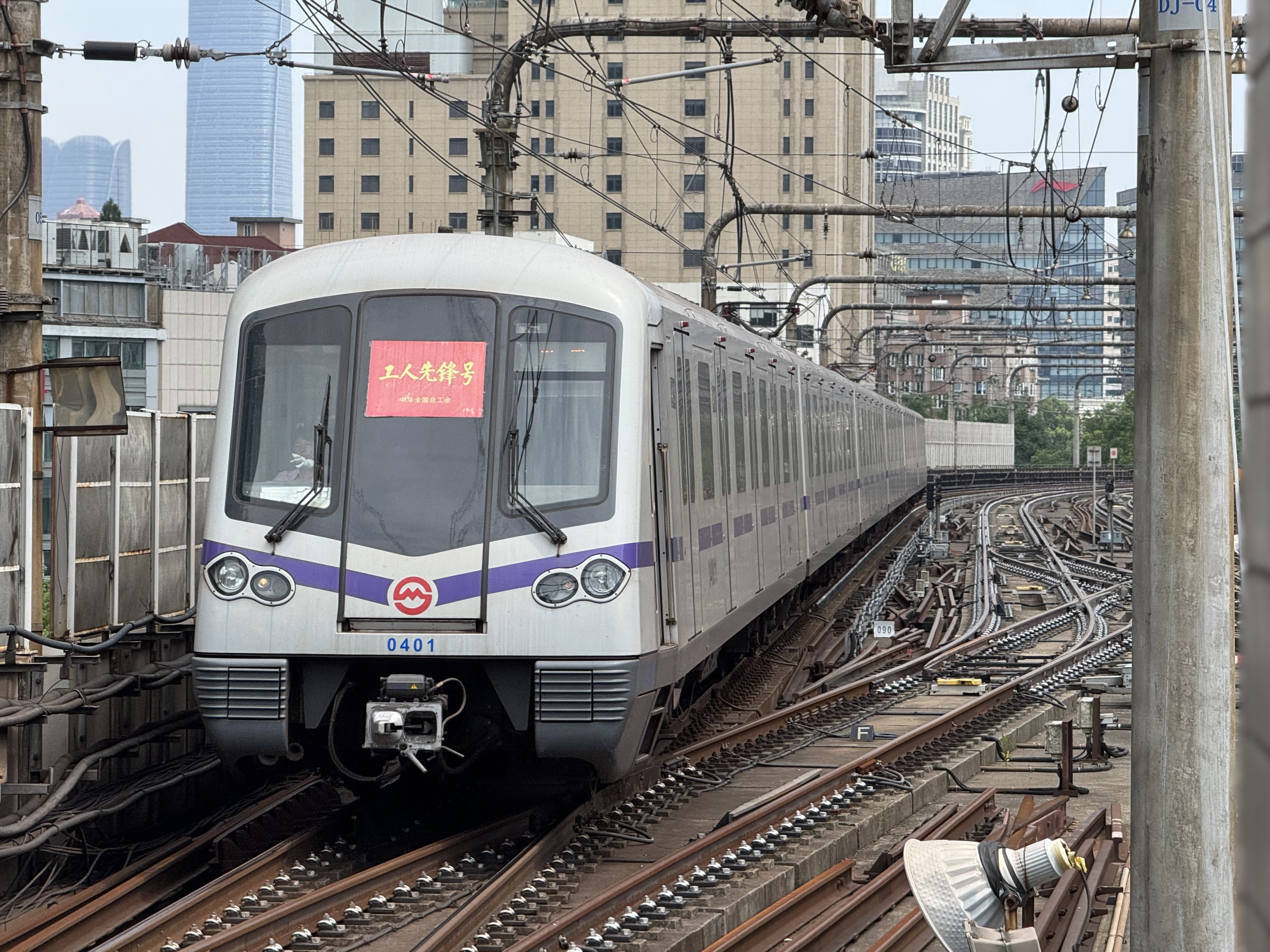
- An 04A01 train approaching Zhongshan Park station

Overview
- Other name(s): M4 (planned name); Pearl line phase II (Chinese: 明珠线二期); Loop line (Chinese: 环线)
- Native name: 上海地铁4号线
- Status: Operational
- Owner: Shanghai Rail Transit Pearl Line (Phase II) Development Co., Ltd. (except shared track with line 3 portion)
- Locale: Huangpu, Xuhui, Changning, Putuo, Jing'an, Hongkou, Yangpu, and Pudong districts, Shanghai, China
- Termini: Continuous loop from/to Yishan Road (terminal for trains to depot)
- Stations: 26 (of which 9 shared with line 3)

Service
- Type: Rapid transit
- System: Shanghai Metro
- Operator: Shanghai No. 3 Metro Operation Co. Ltd.
- Depot: Puhuitang Yard
- Rolling stock: 04A01; 04A02
- Daily ridership: 976,000 (2019 Peak)

History
- Work began: 2001; 25 years ago
- Opened: December 31, 2005; 20 years ago
- Last extension: September 21, 2007; 18 years ago

Technical
- Line length: 33.7 km (20.9 mi) (of which 11.57 km (7.2 mi) shared with line 3)
- Number of tracks: 2
- Character: Underground and elevated (shared track with line 3 portion)
- Track gauge: 1,435 mm (4 ft 8 1/2 in)
- Electrification: Overhead lines (1500 volts DC)
- Operating speed: 80 km/h (50 mph); Average speed: 32.7 km/h (20 mph)
- Signalling: ALSTOM/CASCO URBALISTM 200 (Enhanced fixed block, current); CASCO Qiji TACS (2025 exp.)
Route map
Route on the Shanghai map:
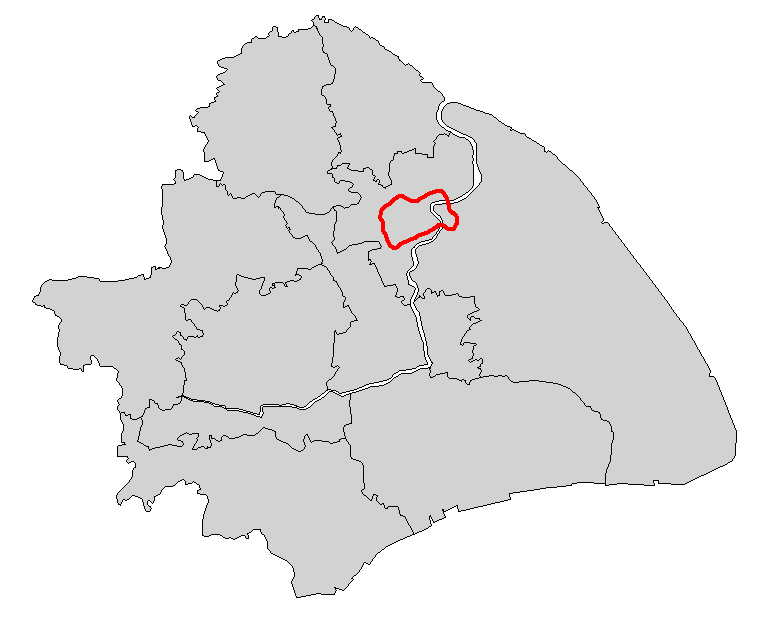
To scale geographic map:

Line 4 is a loop line of the Shanghai Metro network. The older rolling stock 04A01 carry a bright purple colour belt to differentiate them from Line 3 trains which share a portion of its route, while the newer 04A02 stock features a yellow and purple livery, which the exact line is labelled using sticker or screens saying "Line 3" or "Line 4". To determine the direction of travel, the line that travels counter-clockwise is called the Outer Loop (外圈), while the other line is known as the Inner Loop (内圈). Although it is a loop line, trains returning to the depot use Yishan Road as a terminal to let all passengers disembark. The first segment of the line between Damuqiao Road and Lancun Road (running in a "C"-shape) opened on December 31, 2005. The remainder of the line opened on December 29, 2007. The line is colored purple on system maps.

== History ==
Shanghai metro line 4 opening history
Segment	Commencement	Opened	Length	Station(s)	Name	Investment
Damuqiao Road — Hongqiao Road	26 Dec 2000	31 Dec 2005	3.94 km (2.45 mi)	5	Pearl Line (second phase)	¥12.6 billion
Hongqiao Road — Baoshan Road	26 Dec 2000	31 Dec 2005	11.52 km (7.16 mi) (tracks sharing)	9	Line 3 & 4 realignment project	¥12.6 billion
Baoshan Road — Lancun Road	26 Dec 2000	31 Dec 2005	9.76 km (6.06 mi)	8	Pearl Line (second phase)	¥12.6 billion
Lancun Road — Damuqiao Road	22 Oct 2005	29 Dec 2007	8.7 km (5.41 mi)	4	Loop line connector project

The line became China's first national "Worker Pioneer" metro line on the 11th October, 2009.

=== Construction accident ===
On August 20, 2001, on 20.10 at Luban Road construction site during excavating the foundation pit, earthmoving sudden landslide, killing four people died who were buried in the landslide.

At 4 o'clock in the morning on July 1, 2003, the Pudongnan Road-Nanpu Bridge section of Line 4 suddenly saw water seepage during the construction of the connecting passage between the upper and lower tunnels. After that, a large amount of quicksand poured into the tunnel, causing internal and external pressure imbalance, which caused partial collapse of the tunnel. It has a funnel-shaped settlement. At 9 o'clock in the morning, the podium of a nearby building on South Zhongshan Road collapsed; beginning in the early morning of the July 2, the flood wall of Dongjiadu Waima Road section began to sink and crack due to the settlement. The embankment collapsed in a serious accident. The Linjiang Garden Building near the scene also experienced subsidence, the most serious settlement exceeded 7 millimeters (0.28 in) in an hour, and the cumulative settlement reached 15.6 millimeters (0.61 in). This incident affected the plan for the opening of the entire line of Line 4. In August 2004, the Dongjiadu section restoration project was started and it was restored with the opening of the second section in July 2007. On November 5, 2004, the Shanghai Second Intermediate People's Court issued a judgement on the deputy project manager of the subcontractor for the construction of the intermediate air shaft and side channel freezing method. The court convicted him for the crime of a major liability accident which has a fixed-term imprisonment of two years and six months and a probation of three years. The project director representative has a fixed-term imprisonment of six-month with a probation period of two years. The general contractor's project manager for two years with a fixed-term imprisonment of one year and six months.

At Hailun Road unbalanced subsidence was discovered. From January 22 to January 28, 2012, it was closed for an overhaul.

== Stations ==
=== Service routes ===
Shanghai metro line 4 service routes
M - Mainline: Full Loop; P - Partial Mainline: Linping Road ↔ Yishan Road
Routes		Station name		3	Connections	Distance			Location	Open- ing	Plat- form
M	P	English	Chinese	3	Connections	km		min	Location	Open- ing	Plat- form
— ↑ Loop line towards Shanghai Indoor Stadium (Outer Loop) ↑ —						1.14	1.14	3
●	●	Yishan Road	宜山路		3 (Note: It is the southernmost station shared by lines 3 and 4, although the two lines do not share tracks (the line 3 station is elevated).) 9	0.00	0.00	0	Xuhui	31 Dec 2005	Underground Island
●		Hongqiao Road	虹桥路	●	10	1.37	1.37	3	Changning	31 Dec 2005	Elevated Side
●		West Yan'an Road	延安西路	●	Yan'an BRT	1.41	2.78	5	Changning	31 Dec 2005	Elevated Side
●		Zhongshan Park	中山公园	●	2	0.96	3.74	7	Changning	31 Dec 2005	Elevated Island
●		Jinshajiang Road	金沙江路	●	13	1.66	5.40	10	Putuo	31 Dec 2005	Elevated Side
●		Caoyang Road	曹杨路	●	11 14 (Note: Virtual transfer with line 14 – passengers who hold the Shanghai Public Transportation Card and transfer within 30 minutes of exiting the station are able to transfer to other lines without exiting the system.)	0.90	6.30	12	Putuo	31 Dec 2005	Elevated Side
●		Zhenping Road	镇坪路	●	7	1.40	7.70	14	Putuo	31 Dec 2005	Elevated Side
●		Zhongtan Road	中潭路	●		1.44	9.14	17	Putuo	31 Dec 2005	Elevated Side
●		Shanghai Railway Station	上海火车站	●	1 (Note: Virtual transfer with line 1 – passengers who hold the Shanghai Public Transportation Card and transfer within 30 minutes of exiting the station are able to transfer to other lines without exiting the system.) SHH	1.72	10.86	19	Jing'an	31 Dec 2005	At-grade Island
●		Baoshan Road	宝山路	● (Note: Only the clockwise platform.)		2.03	12.89	23	Jing'an	31 Dec 2005	Elevated Island & Side
●		Hailun Road	海伦路		10	1.51	14.40	26	Hongkou	31 Dec 2005	Underground Island
●	◐	Linping Road	临平路			1.07	15.47	28	Hongkou	31 Dec 2005	Underground Island & Side
●	●	Dalian Road	大连路		12	1.40	16.87	30	Yangpu	31 Dec 2005	Underground Island
●	●	Yangshupu Road	杨树浦路			0.72	17.59	32	Yangpu	31 Dec 2005	Underground Island
●	●	Pudong Avenue	浦东大道		14	1.44	19.03	35	Pudong	31 Dec 2005	Underground Island
●	●	Century Avenue	世纪大道		2 6 9	1.43	20.46	37	Pudong	31 Dec 2005	Underground Island
●	●	Xiangcheng Road (Note: Formerly named Pudian Road station (浦电路站))	向城路			0.85	21.31	39	Pudong	31 Dec 2005	Underground Island
●	●	Lancun Road	蓝村路		6	1.34	22.65	41	Pudong	31 Dec 2005	Underground Island
●	●	Tangqiao	塘桥			1.21	23.86	44	Pudong	29 Dec 2007	Underground Island
●	●	Nanpu Bridge	南浦大桥			2.13	25.99	47	Huangpu	29 Dec 2007	Underground Split
●	●	South Xizang Road	西藏南路		8	1.22	27.21	49	Huangpu	29 Dec 2007	Underground Island
●	●	Luban Road	鲁班路			1.47	28.68	51	Huangpu	29 Dec 2007	Underground Island
●	●	Damuqiao Road	大木桥路		12	1.19	29.87	53	Xuhui	31 Dec 2005	Underground Island
●	●	Dong'an Road	东安路		7	0.62	30.49	55	Xuhui	31 Dec 2005	Underground Island
●	●	Shanghai Stadium	上海体育场			1.51	32.00	57	Xuhui	31 Dec 2005	Underground Island
●	●	Shanghai Indoor Stadium	上海体育馆		1	0.67	32.67	59	Xuhui	31 Dec 2005	Underground Island
— ↓ Loop line towards Yishan Road (Inner Loop) ↓ —						1.14	33.81	62

=== Important stations ===
- Shanghai Railway Station: Interchange with line 3. To transfer to line 1, passengers need to exit through a tunnel inside Shanghai railway station and purchase a ticket to re-enter the station.
- Zhongshan Park: Interchange with lines 2 and 3.
- Century Avenue: Interchange with lines 2, 6 and 9. It is Shanghai's first 4-line interchange station.
- South Xizang Road: The first platform-to-platform interchange station in the Shanghai Metro network. Interchange with line 8.
- Shanghai Stadium: Serves Shanghai Stadium.
- Shanghai Indoor Stadium: Serves the sports stadium of the same name and the biggest regional and interregional bus station in the city. Interchange with line 1.
- Jinshajiang Road: Serves East China Normal University. Interchange with lines 3 and 13.
- West Yan'an Road: Serves Donghua University.

=== Station name change ===
- On 28 October 2006, Dongfang Road was renamed as the Century Avenue after station renovation for line 2 and the opening of line 4.

== Headways ==
Shanghai Metro Line 4 headway
Time		Inner Loop (running clockwise)	Outer Loop (running counterclockwise)
Monday - Friday (Working Days)
AM peak	7:00–9:00	Linping Road → Century Avenue → Yishan Road: About 3 min and 10 sec Yishan Road → shared track w/ 3 → Linping Road: About 3 min and 45 sec	Yishan Road - Century Avenue - Dalian Road: About 5 min and 30 min; Dalian Road - shared track w/ 3 - Yishan Road: About 7 min and 30 sec
Off-peak	9:00–17:00	About 8 min
PM peak	17:00–19:30	About 5 min
Other hours	Before 7:00 After 19:30	About 5 - 12 min
Saturday and Sunday (Weekends)
Peak	7:00–21:00	About 6 min and 30 sec
Other hours	Before 7:00 After 21:00	About 5 - 12 min

== Technology ==
=== Signaling ===
Line 4 has been operating over capacity due to large passenger flows for a number of years. With the continuous extensions of operating time, the problems of aging equipment and increasing passenger demand will further increase the operating pressure of the two lines. In June 2021 it was announced that Shanghai Metro has started to update of the signal system and finish before December 31, 2024. These are the last lines in the system that are equipped with fixed block Alstom URBALISTM 200 system, not equipped with CBTC systems capable of headways as low as 90 seconds. CASCO successfully won the bid for the renewal and transformation of the signaling using Qiji TACS system.

=== Rolling Stock ===
The line operates with 6-car Class A trains. (Note: Class A carriage: 21-24m in length, 3.0m in width and 3.8m in height; Capacity: about 310 people.)

Shanghai Metro Line 4 rolling stock
Fleet numbers	Manufacturer	Time of manufacturing	Class	No of car	Assembly (Note: Tc: Trailer with cab; Mp: EMU with pantograph; M: EMU without pantograph.)	Rolling stock	Number	Notes
168	Siemens (0401,0402); CRRC Zhuzhou Locomotive Co., Ltd. (0403–0428)	2004-2007	A	6	Tc+Mp+M+M+Mp+Tc	04A01	0401-0428 (040011-041681)	Original name: AC05. In February 2009, 8 trains used on line 2 (numbers: 0225-0232) returned to line 4.
162	SATCO (Note: SATCO (Shanghai Alstom Transportation Equipment Co., Ltd.) is a joint venture between Alstom Metropolis and Shanghai Electric.) (0430–0455); CRRC Changchun Railway Vehicles Co., Ltd. (0429)	2014-2017	A	6	Tc+Mp+M+M+Mp+Tc	04A02	0429-0455 (041691-043301)	13 trains (042171-042941, trainset 0437-0449) have been assigned to line 3.

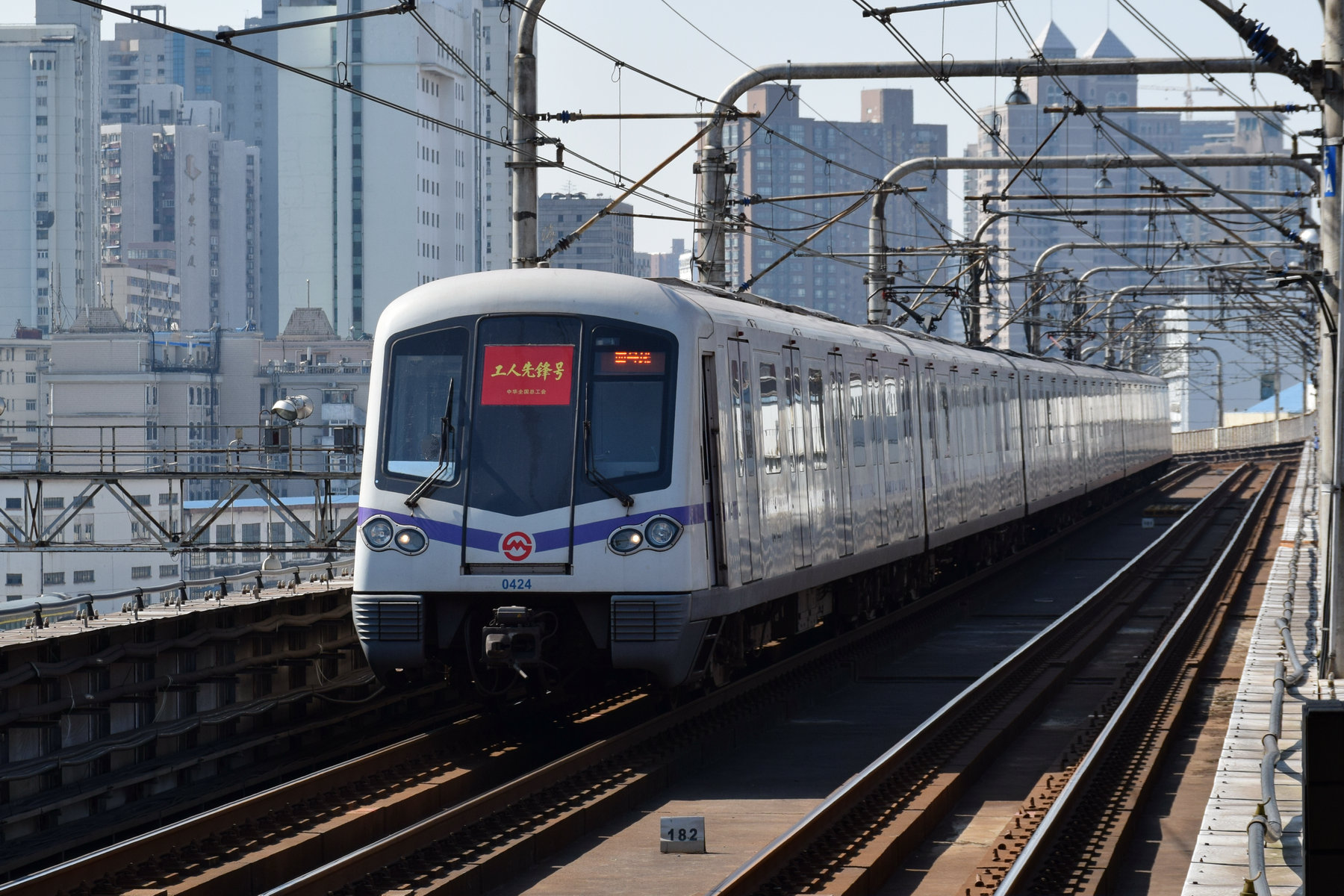
04A01 train

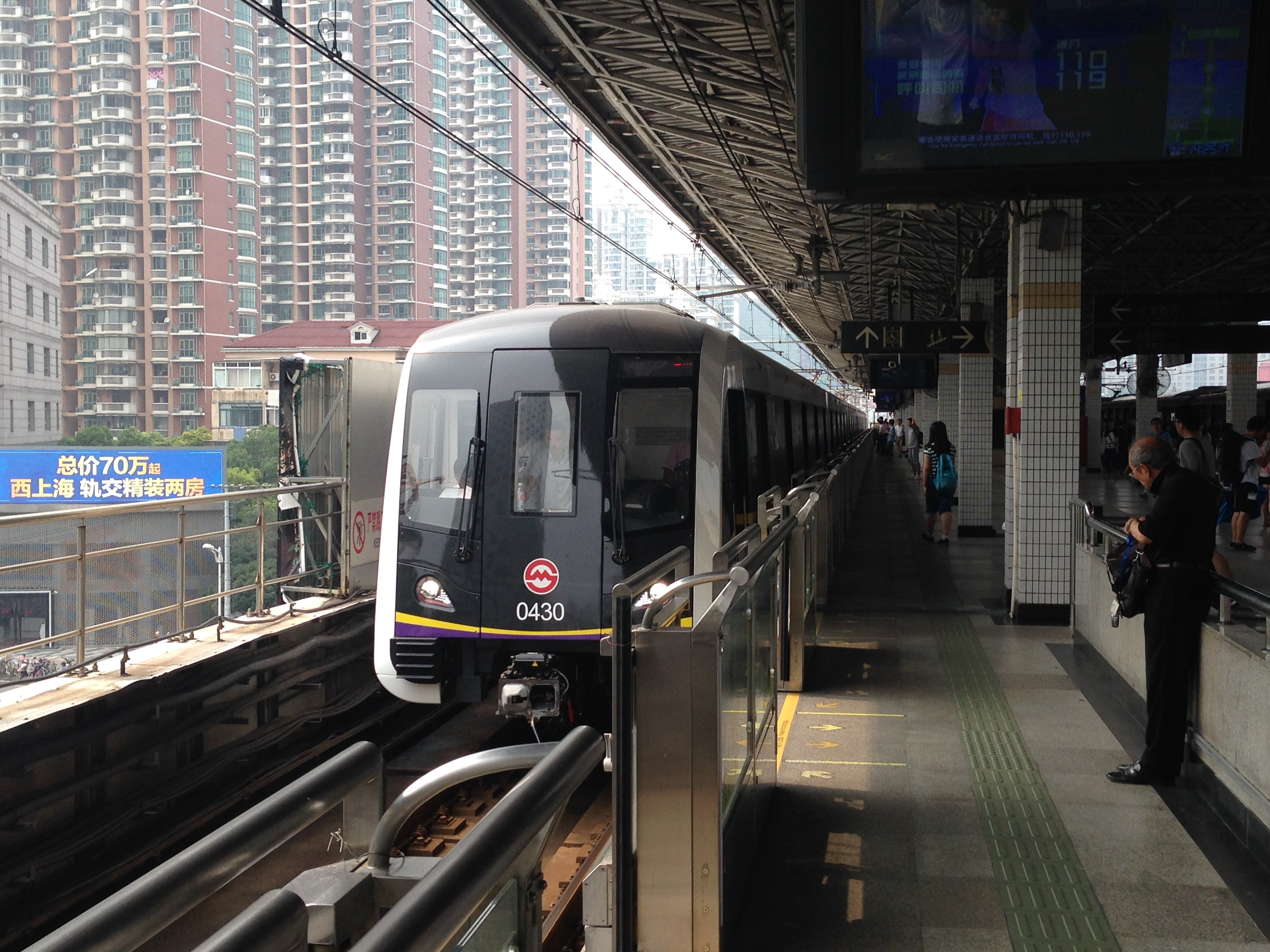
04A02 train
