= Dalian Road station =

Shanghai Metro interchange station

Dalian Road 大连路
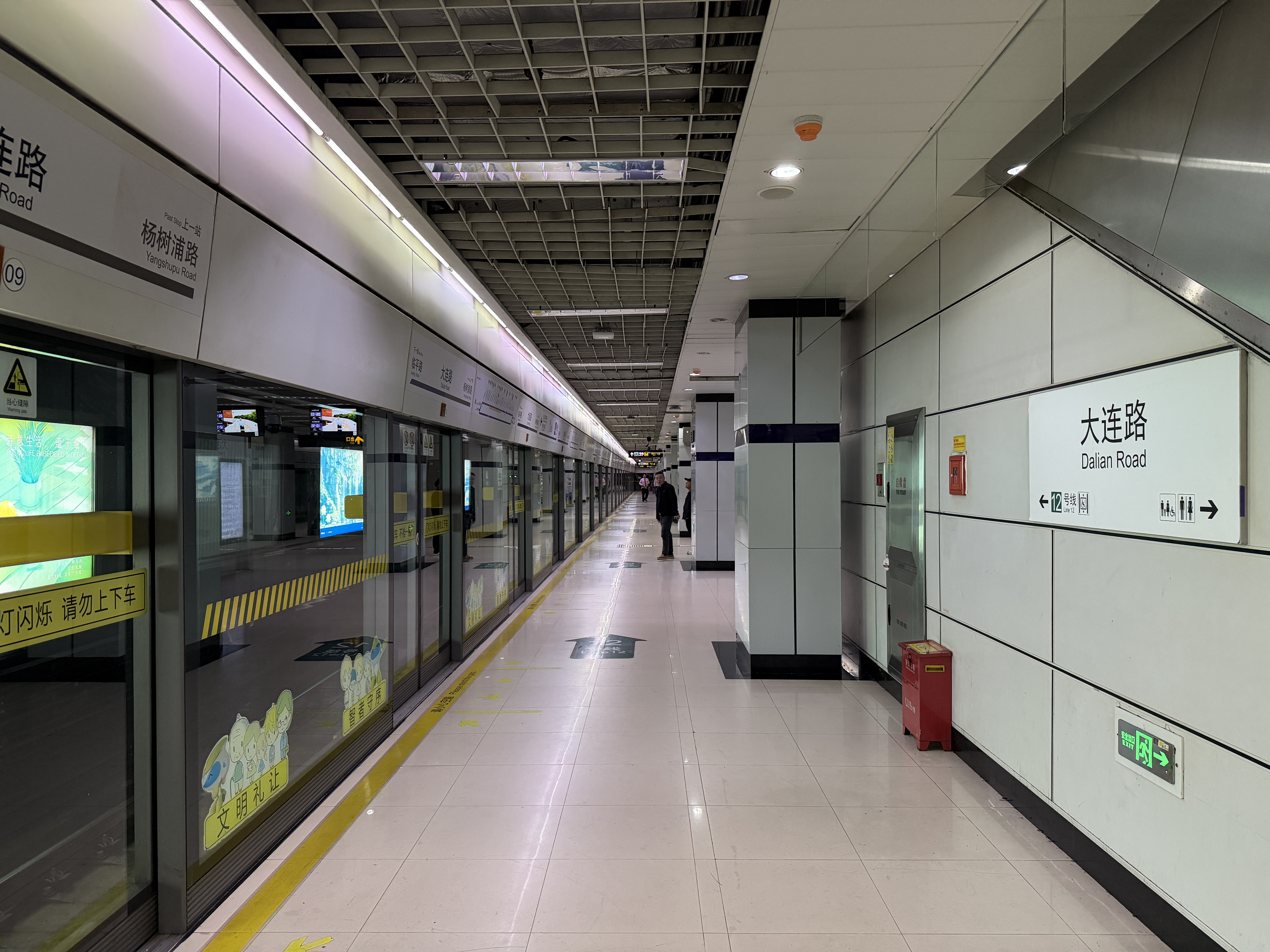
- Line 4 platform

General information
- Location: Dalian Road and Changyang Road; Yangpu District and Hongkou District boundary, Shanghai; China
- Coordinates: 31.26014°N 121.50864°E
- Operator: Shanghai No. 3/4 Metro Operation Co. Ltd.
- Lines: Line 4; Line 12
- Platforms: 4 (2 island platforms)
- Tracks: 4

Construction
- Structure type: Underground
- Accessible: Yes

History
- Opened: 31 December 2005; 20 years ago (Line 4); 29 December 2013; 12 years ago (Line 12)

Services
Preceding station	Shanghai Metro	Following station
Yangshupu Road Clockwise	Line 4	Linping Road Counter-clockwise
Tilanqiao towards Qixin Road	Line 12	Jiangpu Park towards Jinhai Road
Location
- Location within Shanghai

Dalian Road (simplified Chinese: 大连路; traditional Chinese: 大連路; pinyin: Dàlián Lù) is an interchange station between Line 4 and Line 12 of the Shanghai Metro. Service began on Line 4 on 31 December 2005, while the interchange with Line 12 opened on 29 December 2013 with the initial, eastern section of that line from Tiantong Road to Jinhai Road.

== Station layout ==
1F	Ground level	Exits
B1	Concourse	Tickets, Service Center
B2	Platform 1	← Line 4 counter-clockwise (Linping Road)
B2	Island platform, doors open on the left
B2	Platform 2	Line 4 clockwise (Yangshupu Road) →
B3	Platform 3	← Line 12 towards Qixin Road (Tilanqiao)
B3	Island platform, doors open on the left
B3	Platform 4	Line 12 towards Jinhai Road (Jiangpu Park) →

=== Entrances/exits ===
- Gate 1: Dalian Road, Kunming Road
- Gate 2: Changyang Road, Dalian Road
- Gate 3: Changyang Road, Baoding Road
- Gate 4: Dalian Road, Kunming Road
- Gate 5: Dalian Road, Changyang Road
- Gate 6: Changyang Road, Baoding Road
- Passage A

== Places nearby ==
- The National Anthem Park (国歌公园), in memorial of the March of the Volunteers, is located just beyond Exit 2.
- The National Anthem Gallery (a top 10 museum in Shanghai) is located near the park (151 Jingzhou Road).
- Shanghai China Modern National treasure Art Museum is located near the park (368, Changyang Road)

== Gallery ==
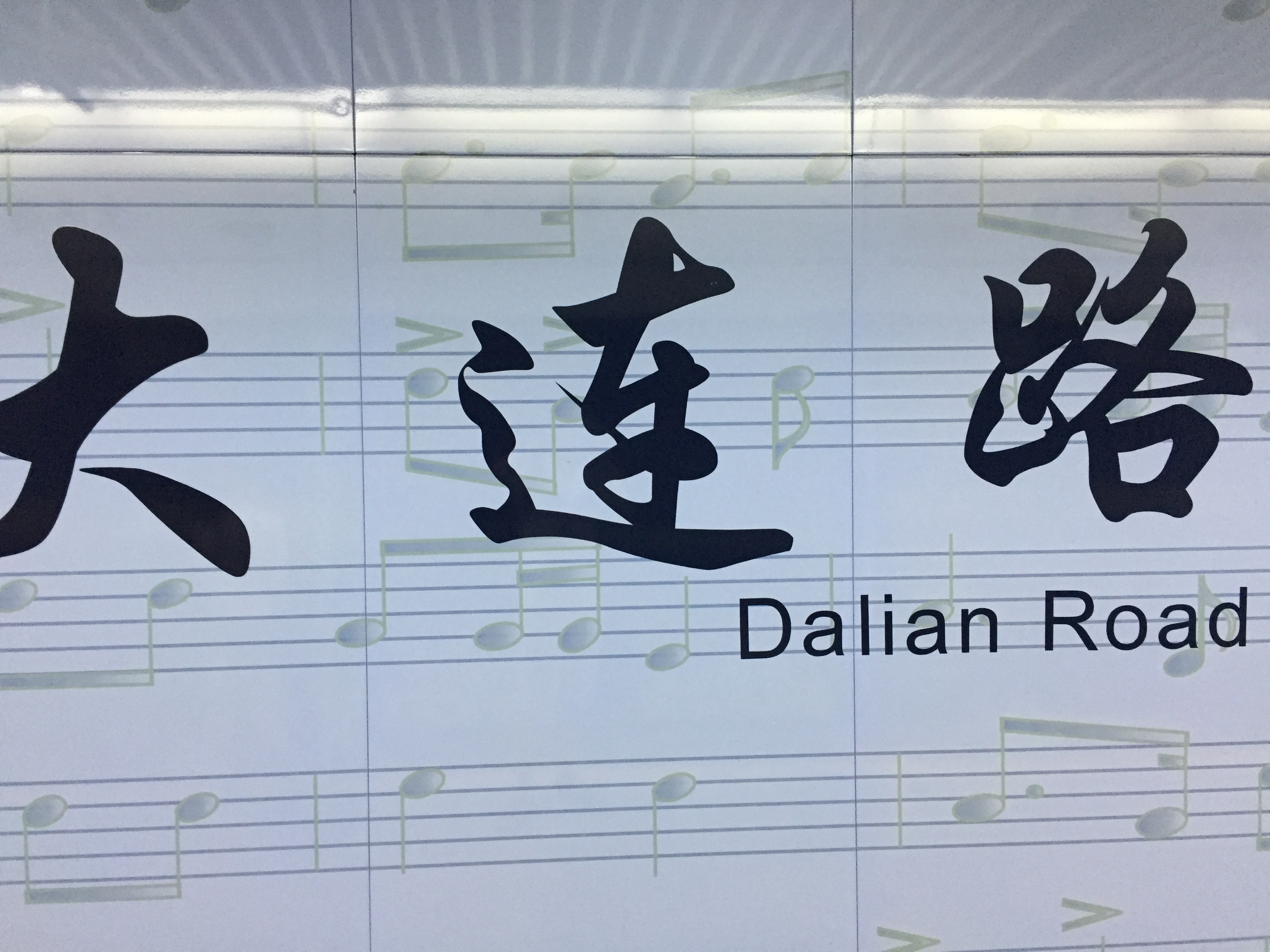
Name sign of Dalian Road on the Line 12 platform

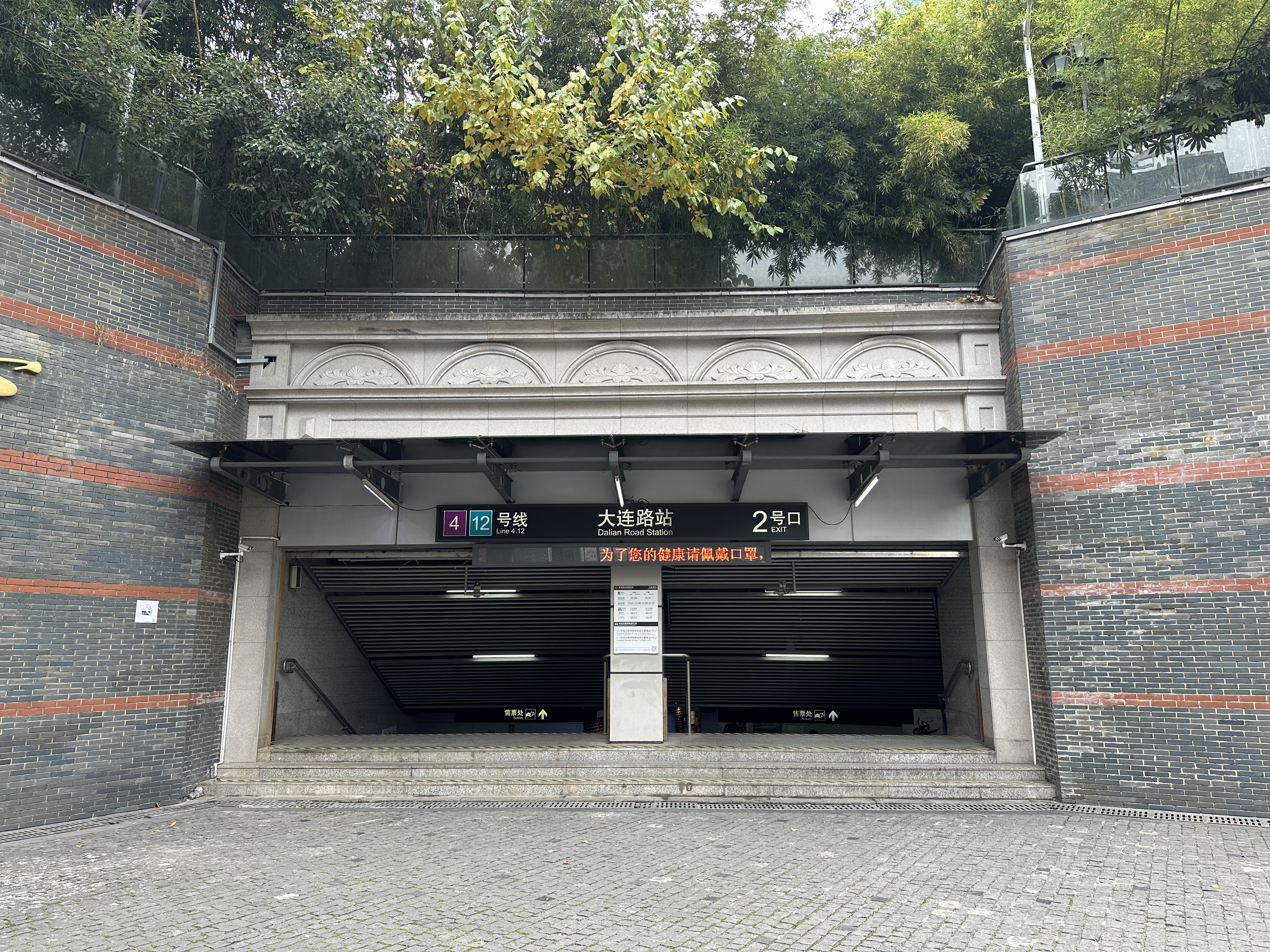
Exit 2

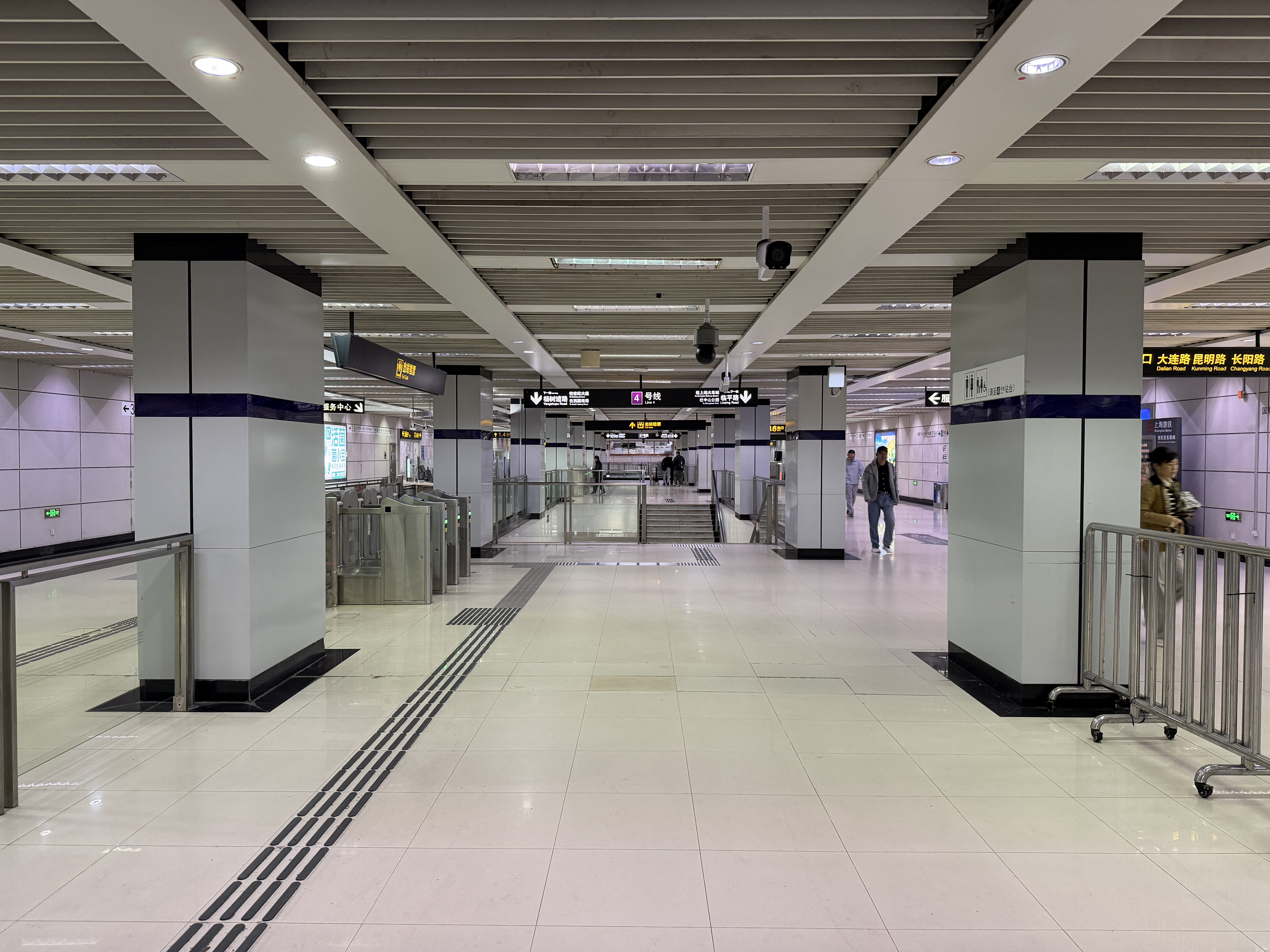
Line 4 concourse

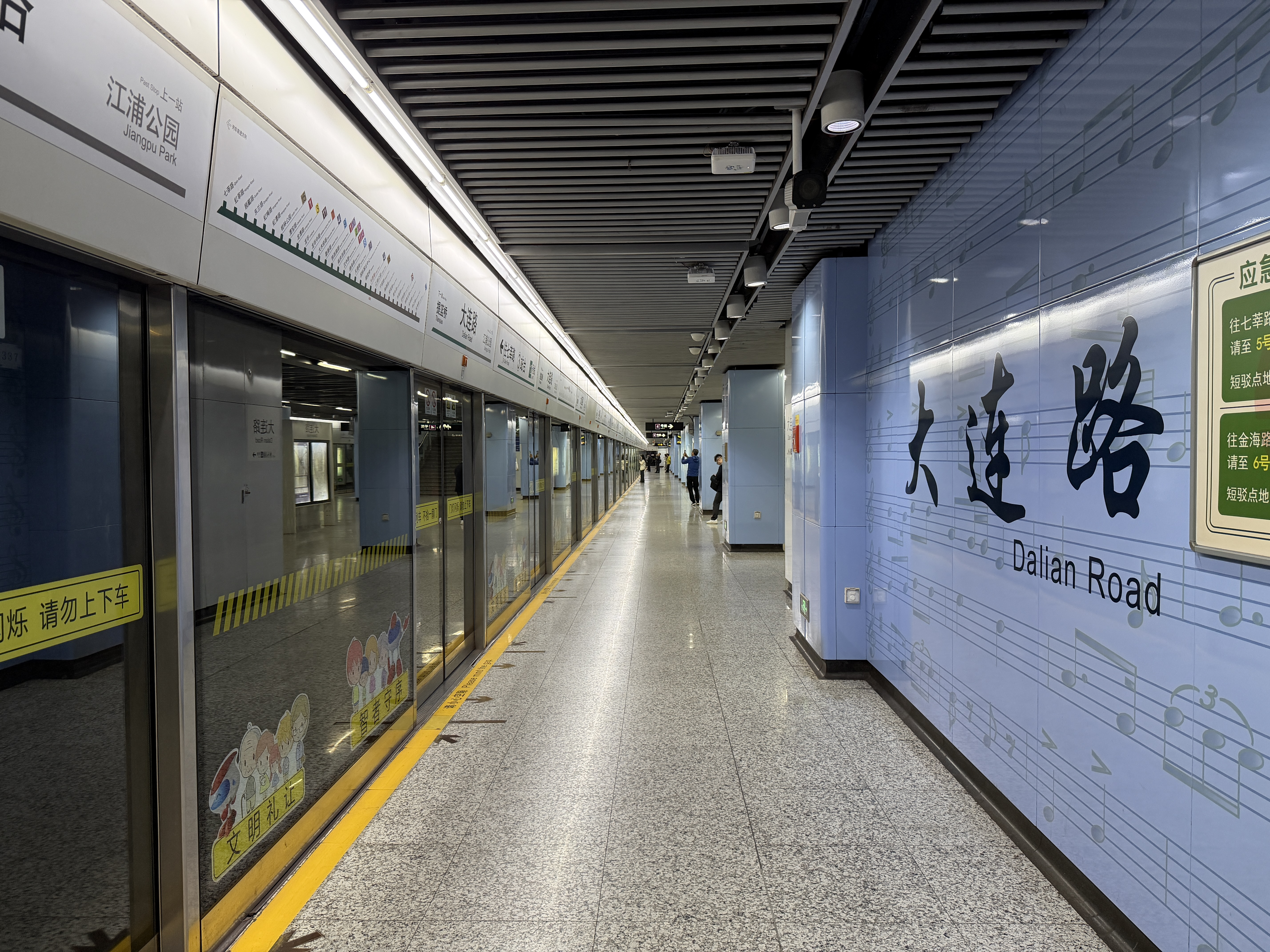
Line 12 platform
