= South Pudong Road station =

Metro station in Shanghai, China

South Pudong Road 浦东南路
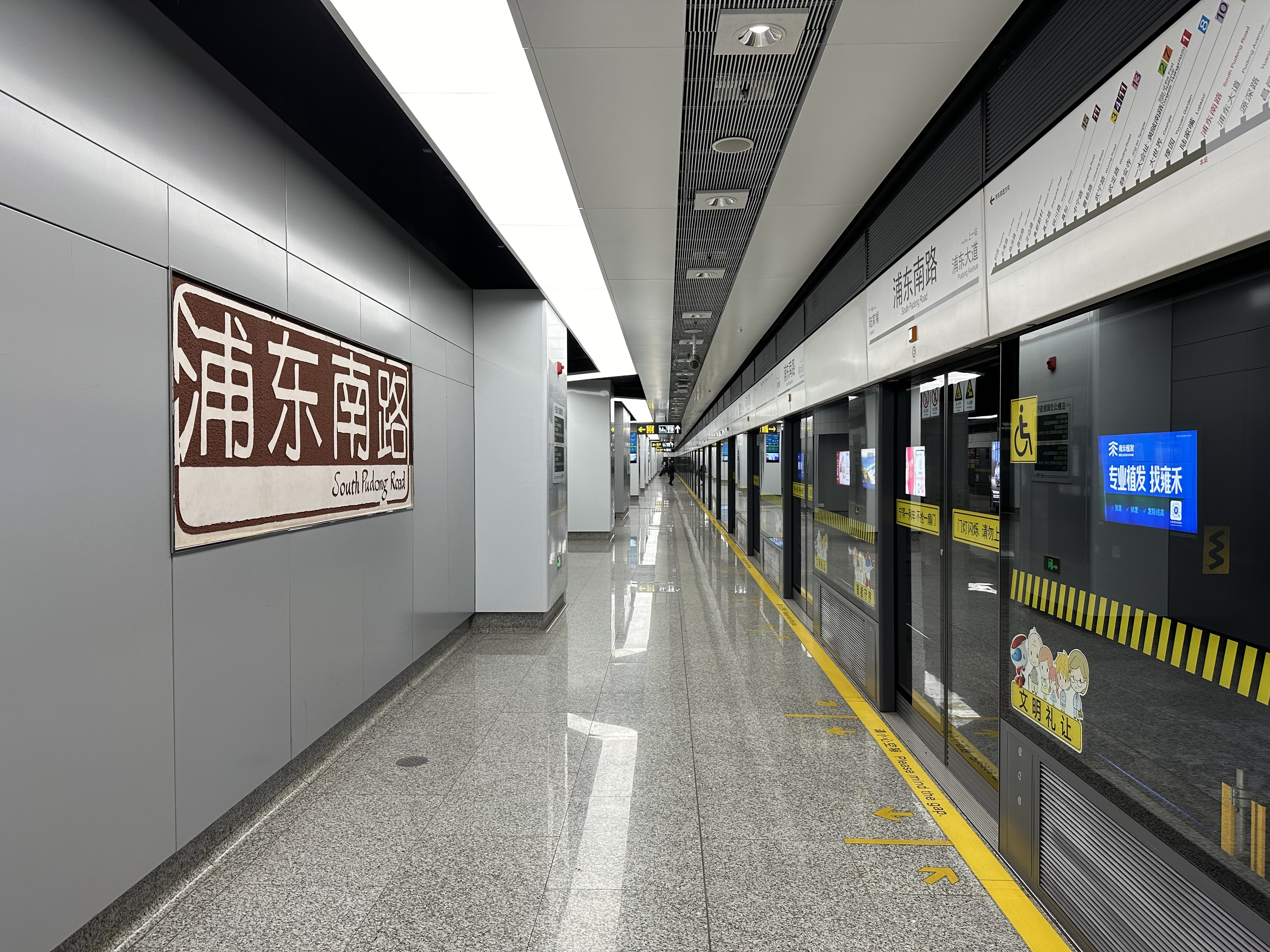
- Line 14 platform

General information
- Other names: Dongchang Road (Line 2 former name)
- Location: South Pudong Road and Pudong Avenue, Pudong, Shanghai; China
- Coordinates: 31.240311°N 121.506891°E
- Lines: Line 2; Line 14; Line 19 (U/C)
- Platforms: 4 (2 island platforms)
- Tracks: 4

Construction
- Structure type: Underground
- Accessible: Yes

History
- Opened: 20 September 1999; 26 years ago (Line 2); 30 December 2021; 4 years ago (Line 14)

Services
Preceding station	Shanghai Metro	Following station
Lujiazui towards Panxiang Road · Shanghai National Accounting Institute	Line 2	Century Avenue towards Pudong Airport Terminal 1&2
Lujiazui towards Fengbang	Line 14	Pudong Avenue towards Guiqiao Road
Tilanqiao towards Shanghai Baoshan Railway Station	Line 19	Shangcheng Road towards Hongjian Road
Location

South Pudong Road (Chinese: 浦东南路) is a station that is part of Line 2 and Line 14 of the Shanghai Metro. The station opened as Dongchang Road (Chinese: 东昌路) on Line 2 on 20 September 1999, and as South Pudong Road on Line 14 on 30 December 2021. Both station names were combined as one on 21 September 2024. The section between this station and Pudong Avenue is the shortest section on Line 14.

While the Line 2 and Line 14 platforms are situated relatively close to each other, they are not interchangeable as they are located along different parts of South Pudong Road. However, this will change when the future Line 19 station is constructed and operational. The adjacent station at Lujiazui can be used to interchange between the lines for the time being.

== History ==
The Line 2 station was known as Dongchang Road (simplified Chinese: 东昌路; traditional Chinese: 東昌路; pinyin: Dōngchāng Lù). It is part of the initial Zhongshan Park to Longyang Road section of Line 2 that opened on 20 September 1999.

The station is located at the intersection of South Pudong Road and Pudong Avenue in Pudong. The Line 14 station opened with the rest of Line 14 on 30 December 2021.

== Gallery ==
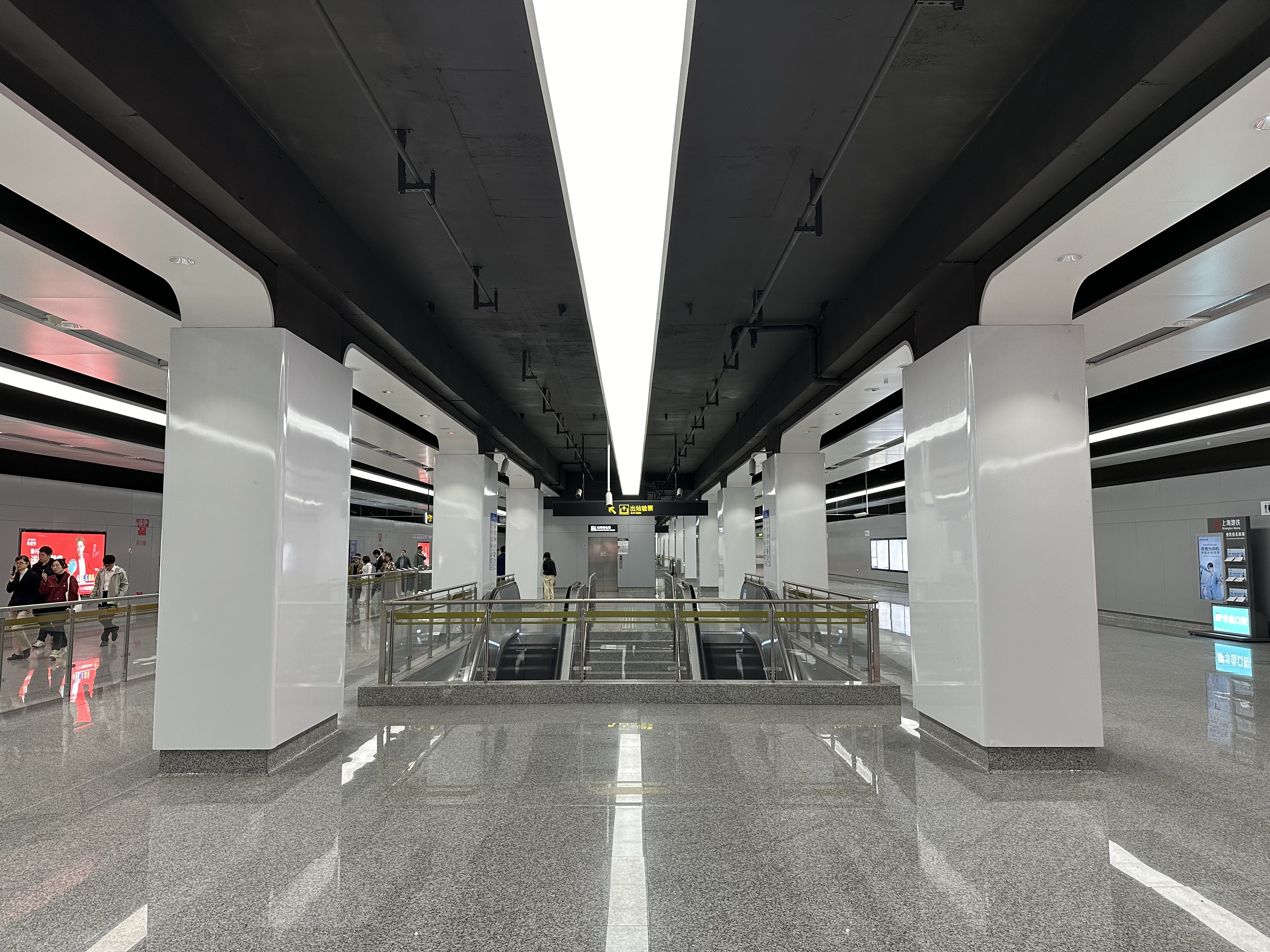
Line 14 concourse

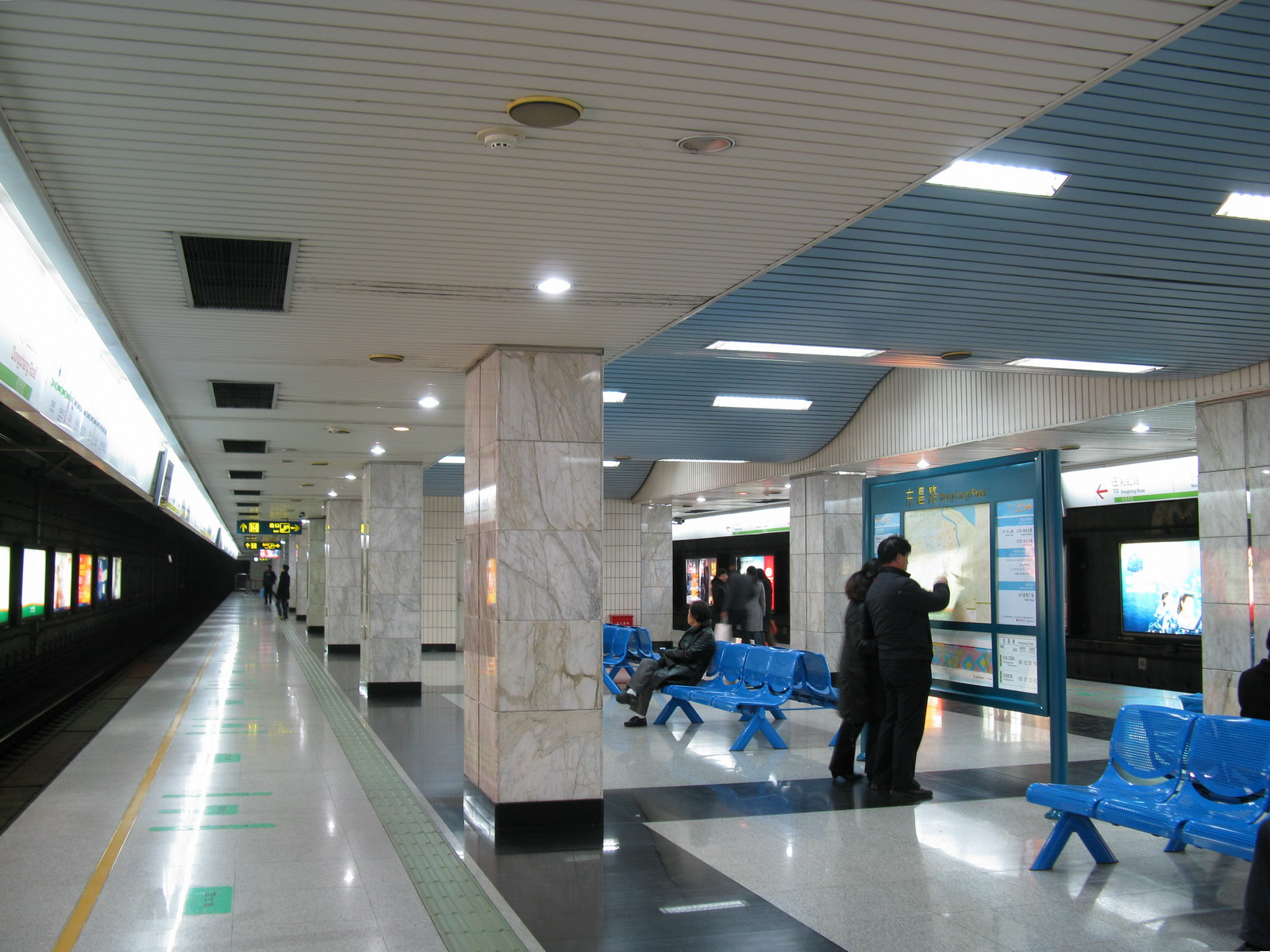
Line 2 platform without edge doors (2008, as Dongchang Road)

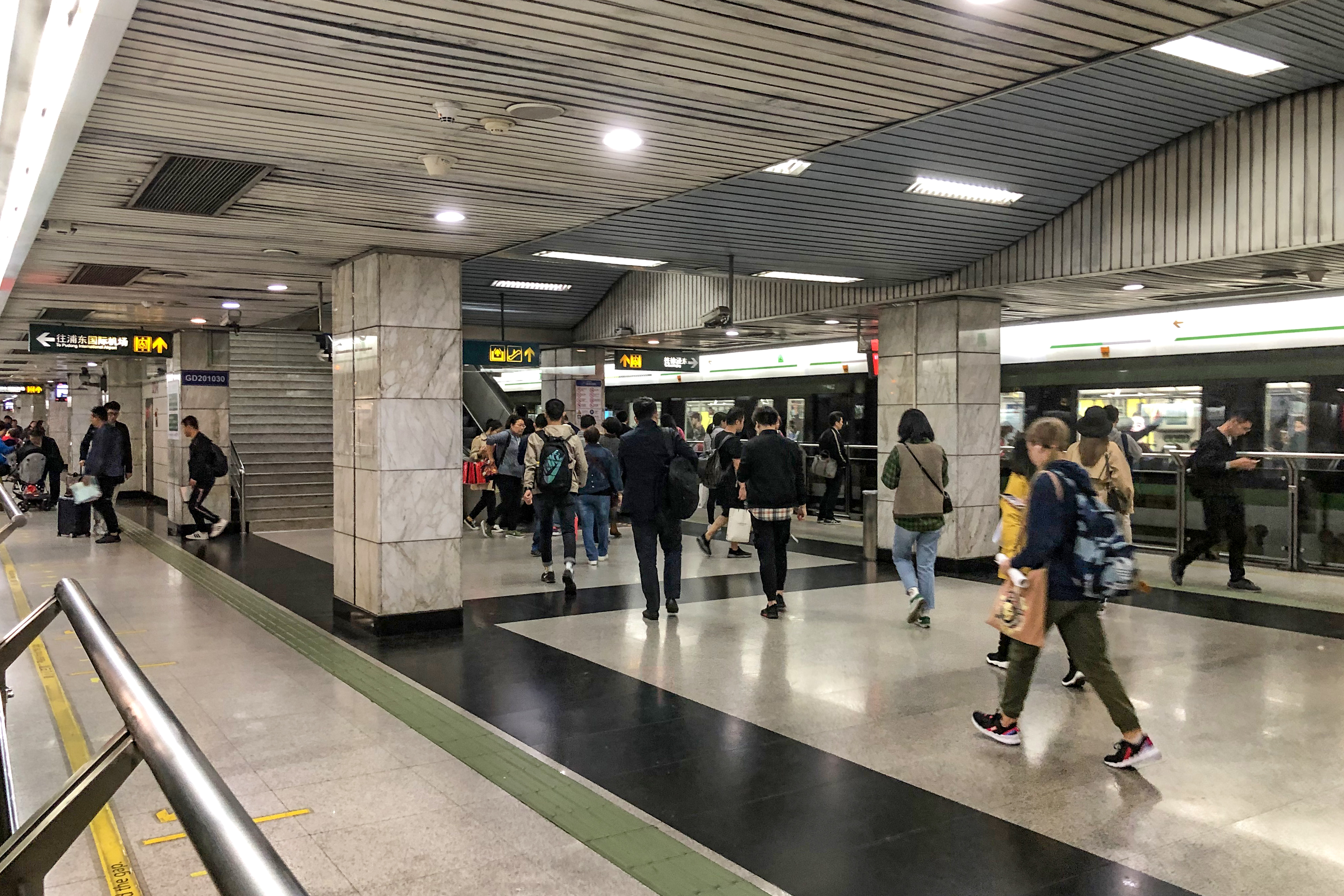
Line 2 platform with old edge doors installed (2019, as Dongchang Road)

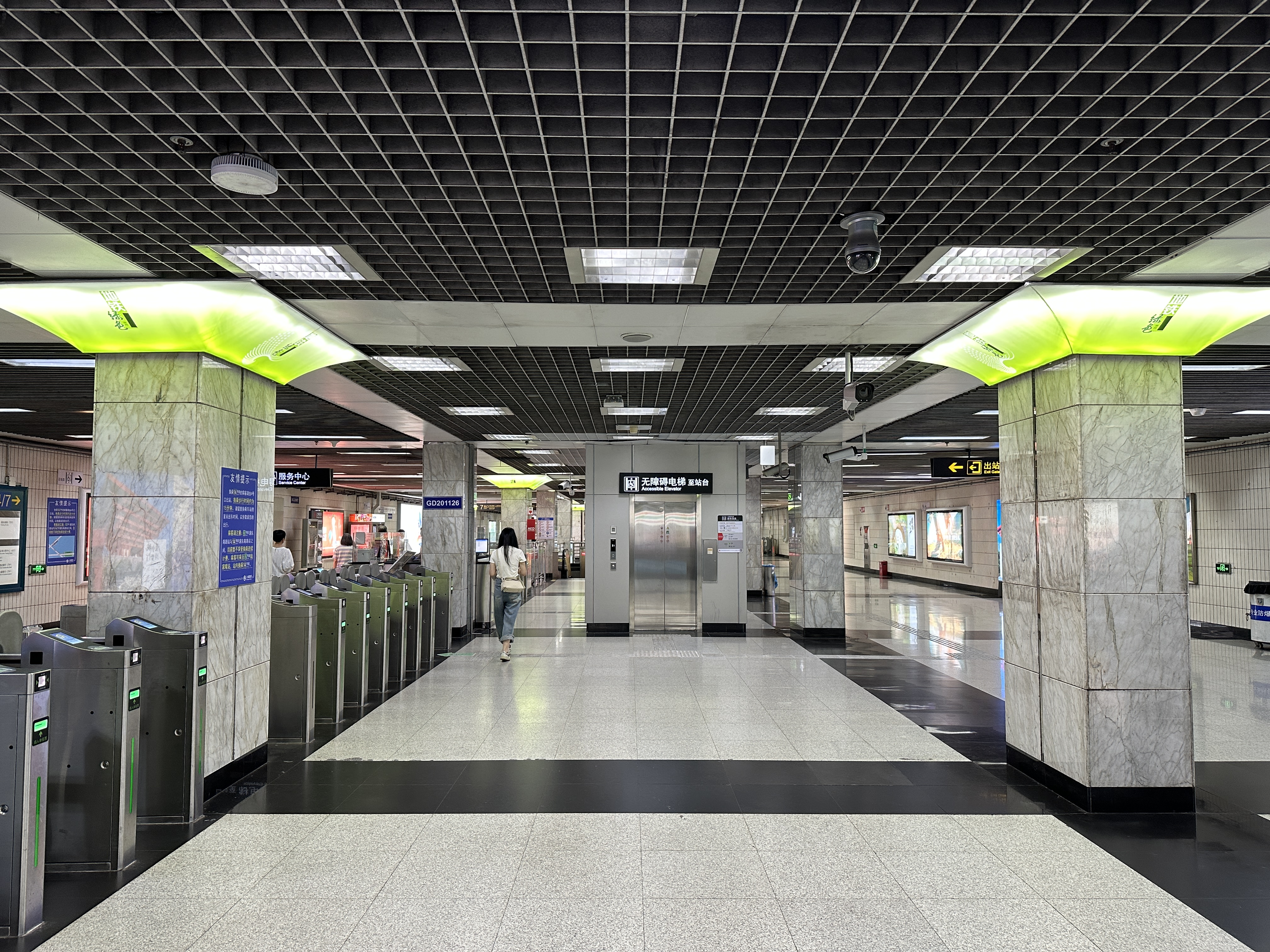
Line 2 concourse

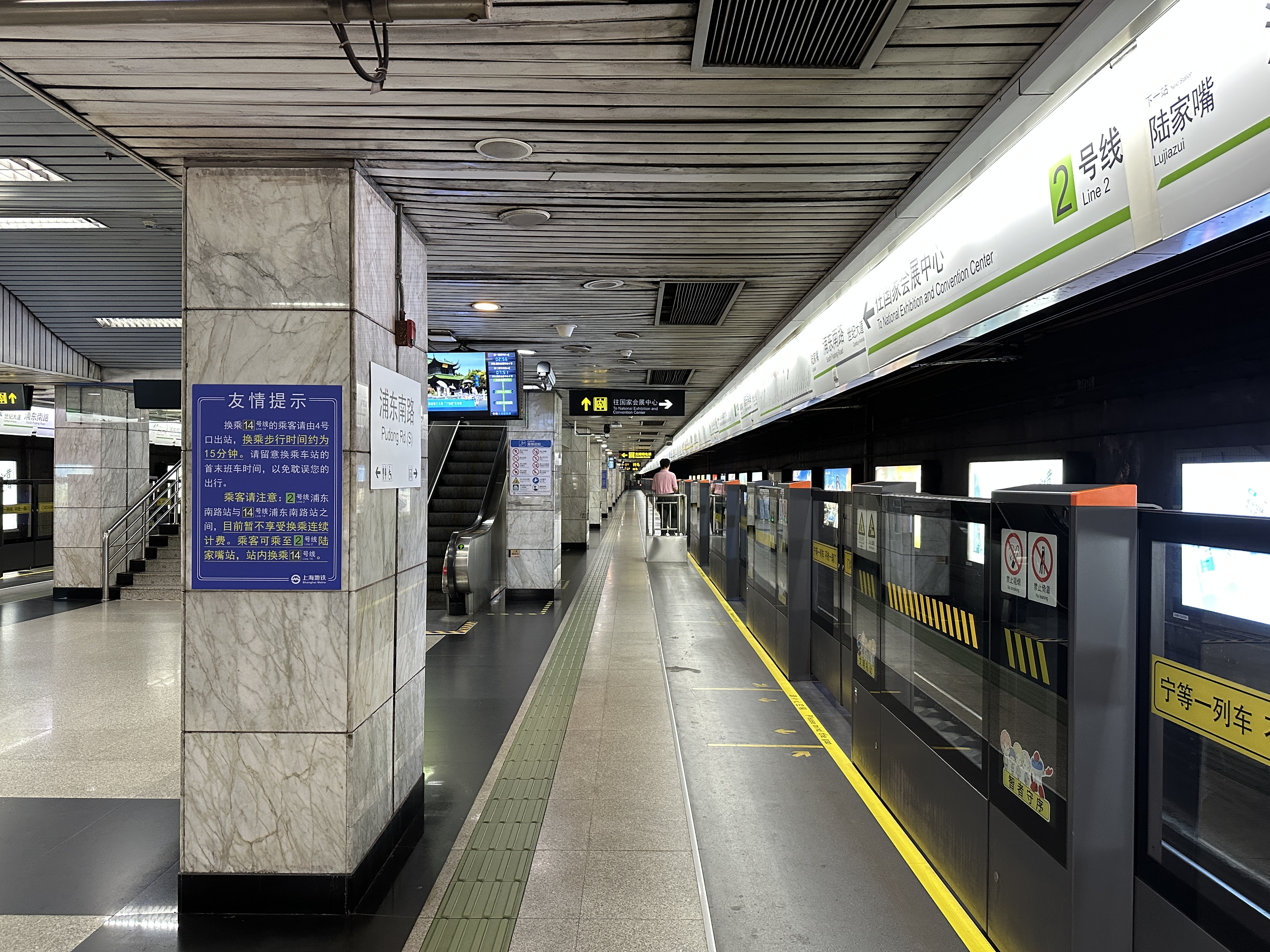
Line 2 platform with updated edge doors (as South Pudong Road)
