= Hailun Road station =

Shanghai Metro interchange station

Hailun Road 海伦路
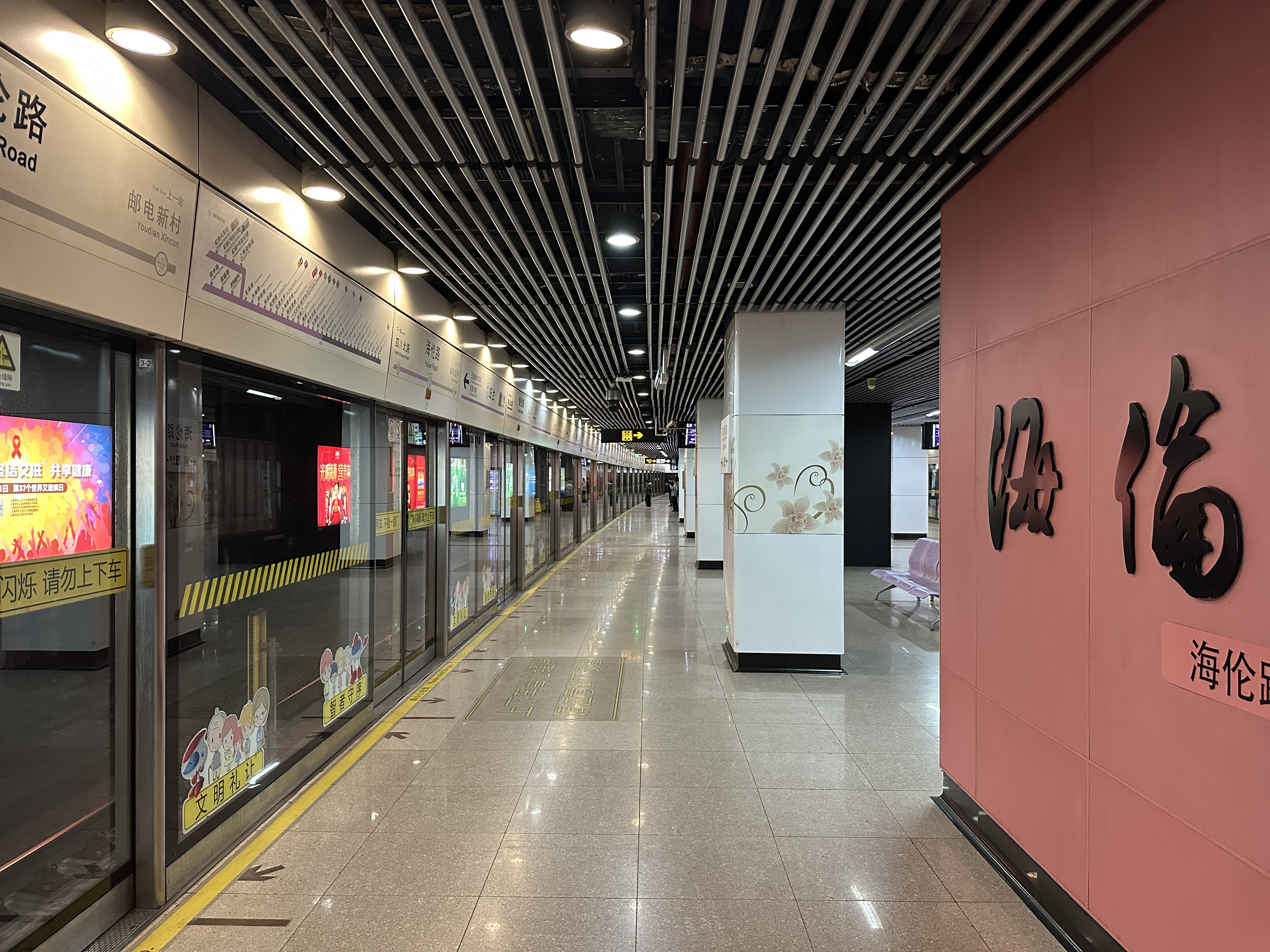
- Line 10 platform

General information
- Location: Hailun Road and Siping Road; Hongkou District, Shanghai; China
- Coordinates: 31°15′34″N 121°29′23″E
- Operator: Shanghai No. 1/3 Metro Operation Co. Ltd.
- Lines: Line 4; Line 10
- Platforms: 4 (2 island platforms)
- Tracks: 4

Construction
- Structure type: Underground
- Accessible: Yes

Other information
- Station code: L10/19 (Line 10)

History
- Opened: 31 December 2005; 20 years ago (Line 4); 10 April 2010; 16 years ago (Line 10)

Services
Preceding station	Shanghai Metro	Following station
Linping Road Clockwise	Line 4	Baoshan Road Counter-clockwise
North Sichuan Road towards Hongqiao Railway Station or Hangzhong Road	Line 10	Youdian Xincun towards Jilong Road
Location
- Location within Shanghai

Hailun Road (simplified Chinese: 海伦路; traditional Chinese: 海倫路; pinyin: Hǎilún Lù) is an interchange station between Lines 4 and 10 of the Shanghai Metro, and is located in the city's Hongkou District. Service began on Line 4 on 31 December 2005, while the interchange with Line 10 opened on 10 April 2010 as part of that line's initial section between Xinjiangwancheng and Hangzhong Road. Towards anti-clockwise on Line 4, this is the last station before sharing with Line 3.

== Places and tourist attractions nearby ==
- As part of the Shanghai Music Valley:
  - The Theatre of SNH48 (Star Dream Theatre)
  - 1933 Old Millfun (slaughterhouse)

== Station Layout ==
G	Entrances and Exits	Exits 1-7
B1	Line 4 Concourse	Faregates, Station Agent
B1	Line 10 Concourse	Faregates, Station Agent
B2	Counterclockwise	← Line 4 to Baoshan Road
B2	Island platform, doors open on the left
B2	Clockwise	Line 4 to Linping Road →
B3	Westbound	← Line 10 towards Hongqiao Railway Station or Hangzhong Road (North Sichuan Road)
B3	Island platform, doors open on the left
B3	Eastbound	Line 10 towards Jilong Road (Youdian Xincun) →

== Gallery ==
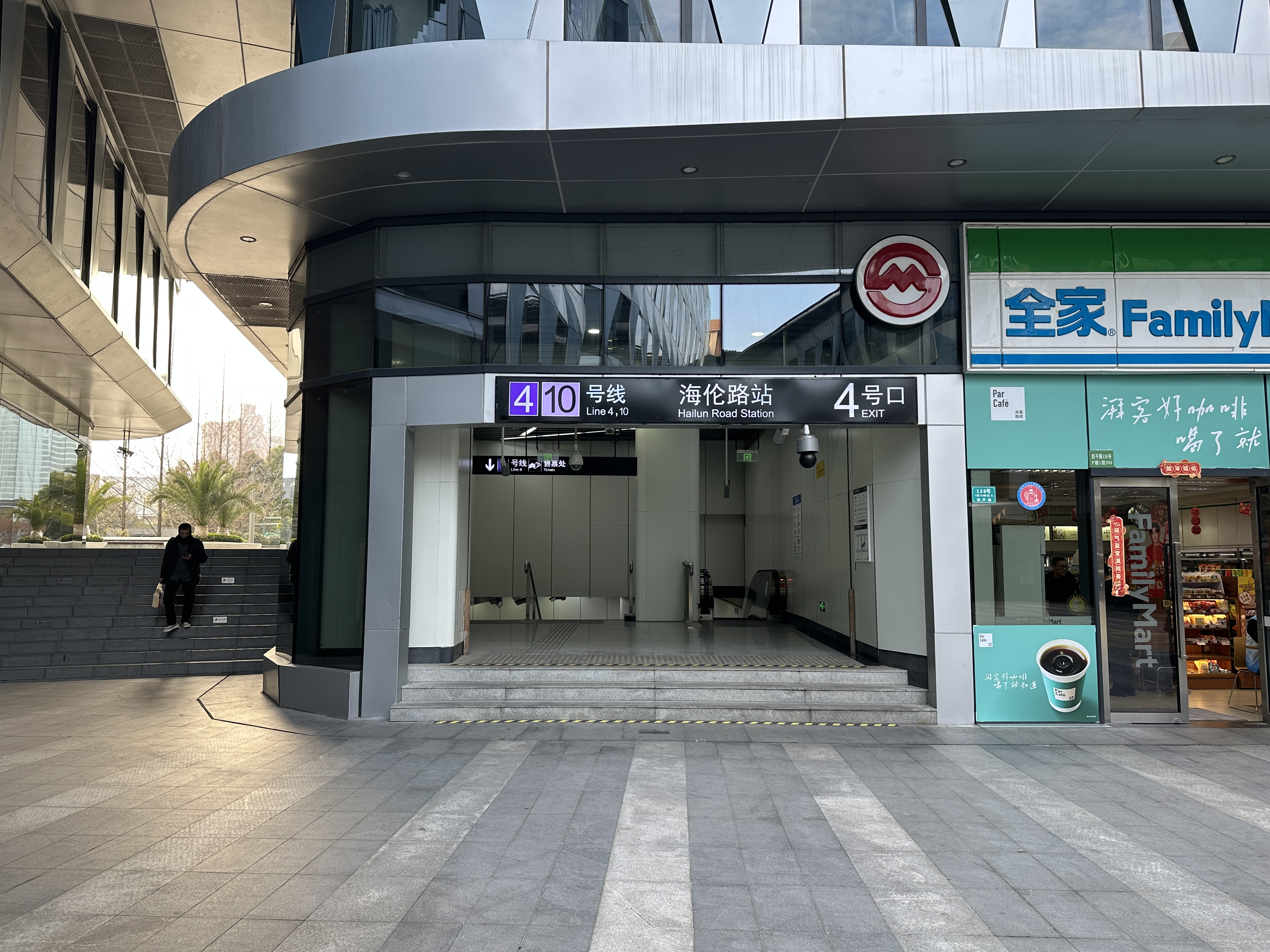
Exit 4

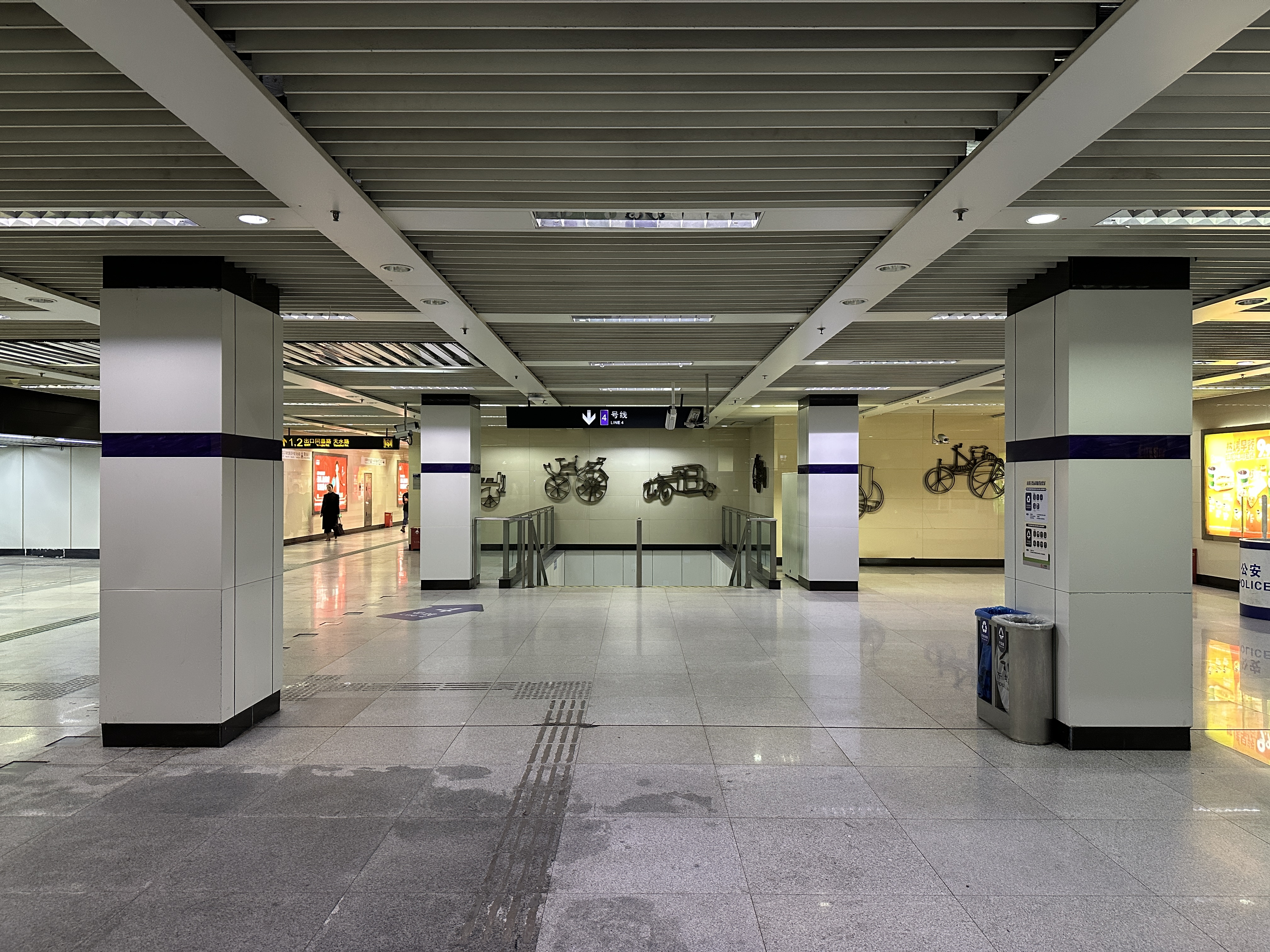
Line 4 concourse

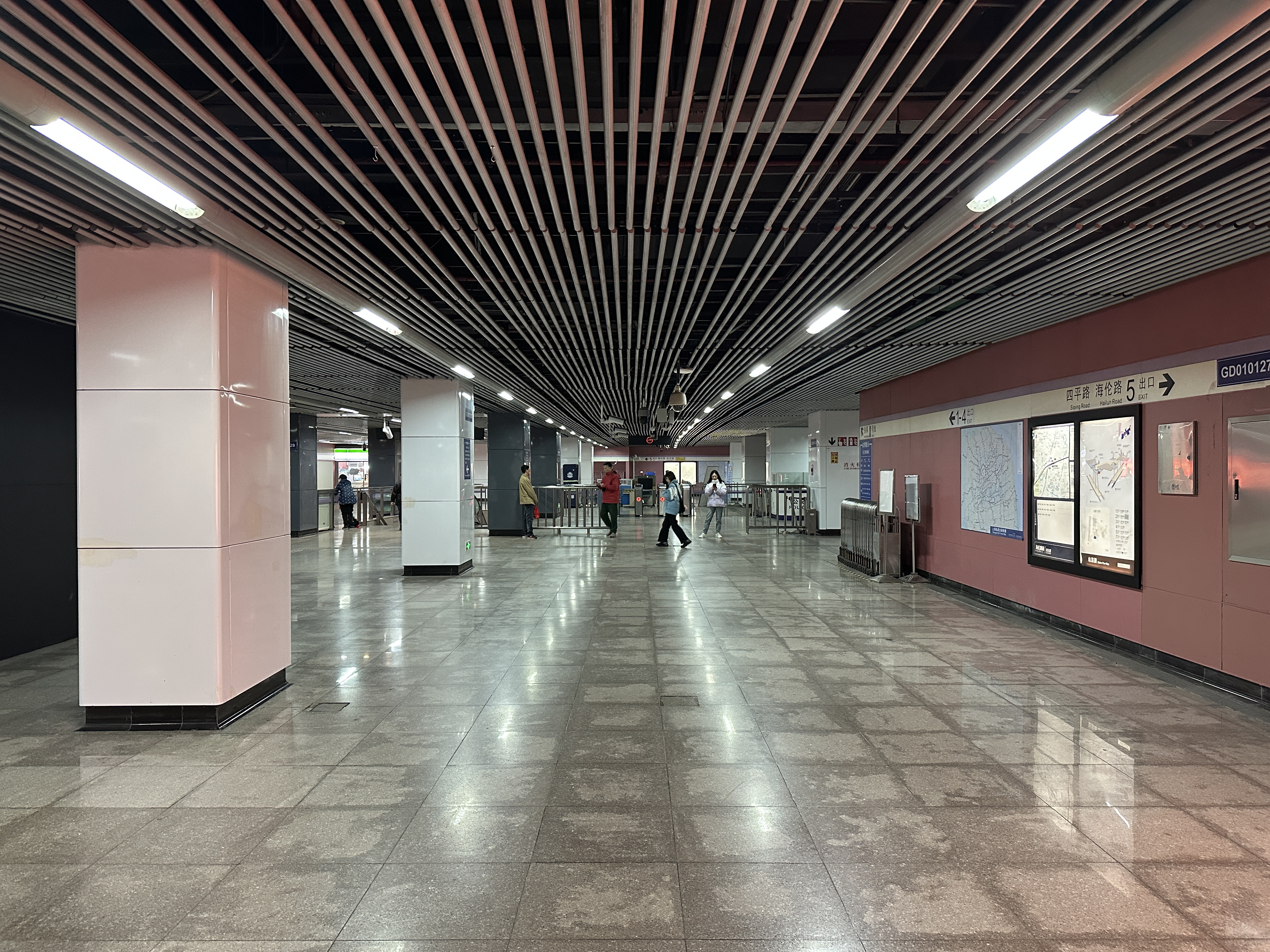
Line 10 concourse

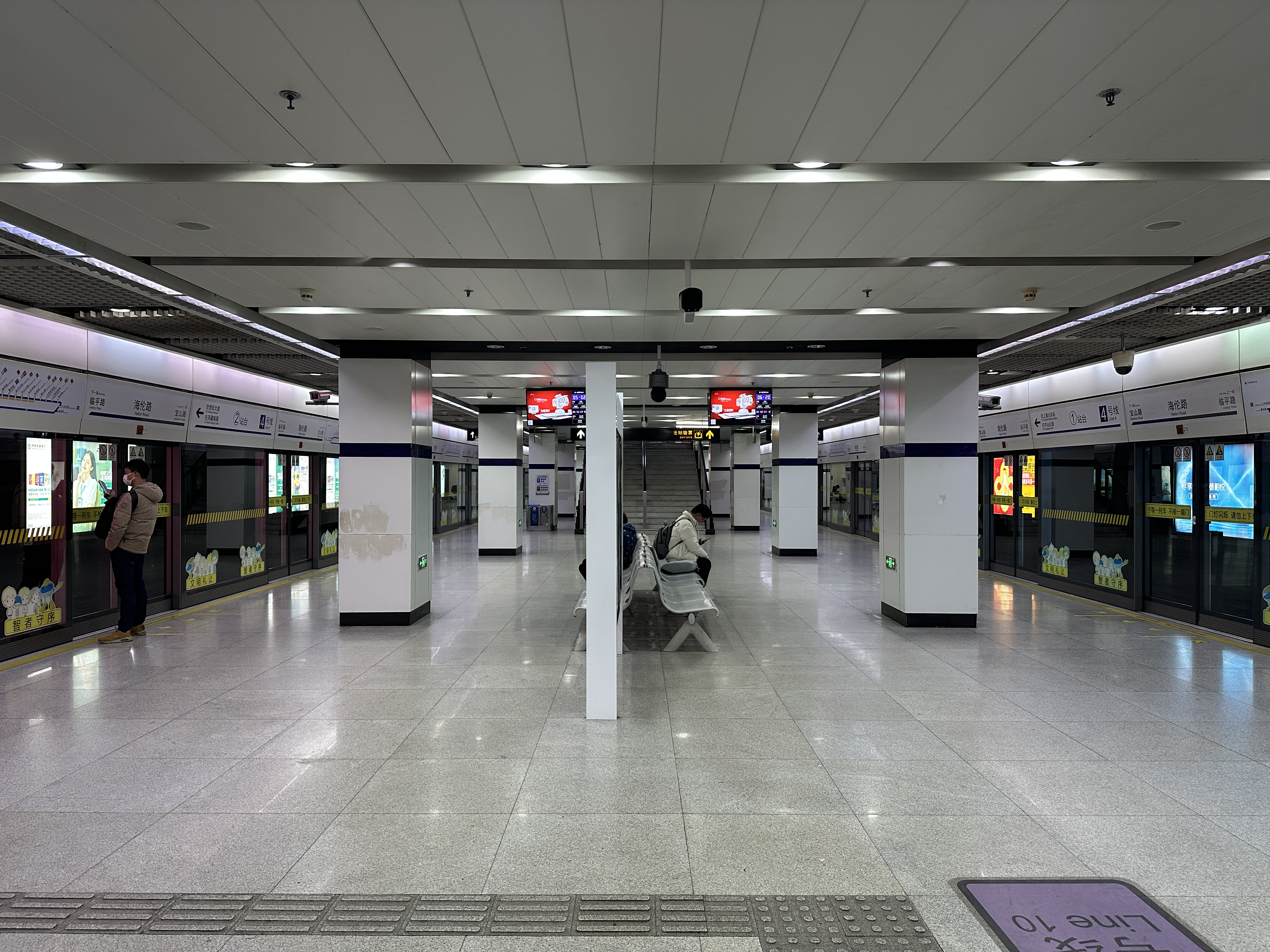
Line 4 platform
