= Linping Road station =

Shanghai Metro station

Linping Road 临平路
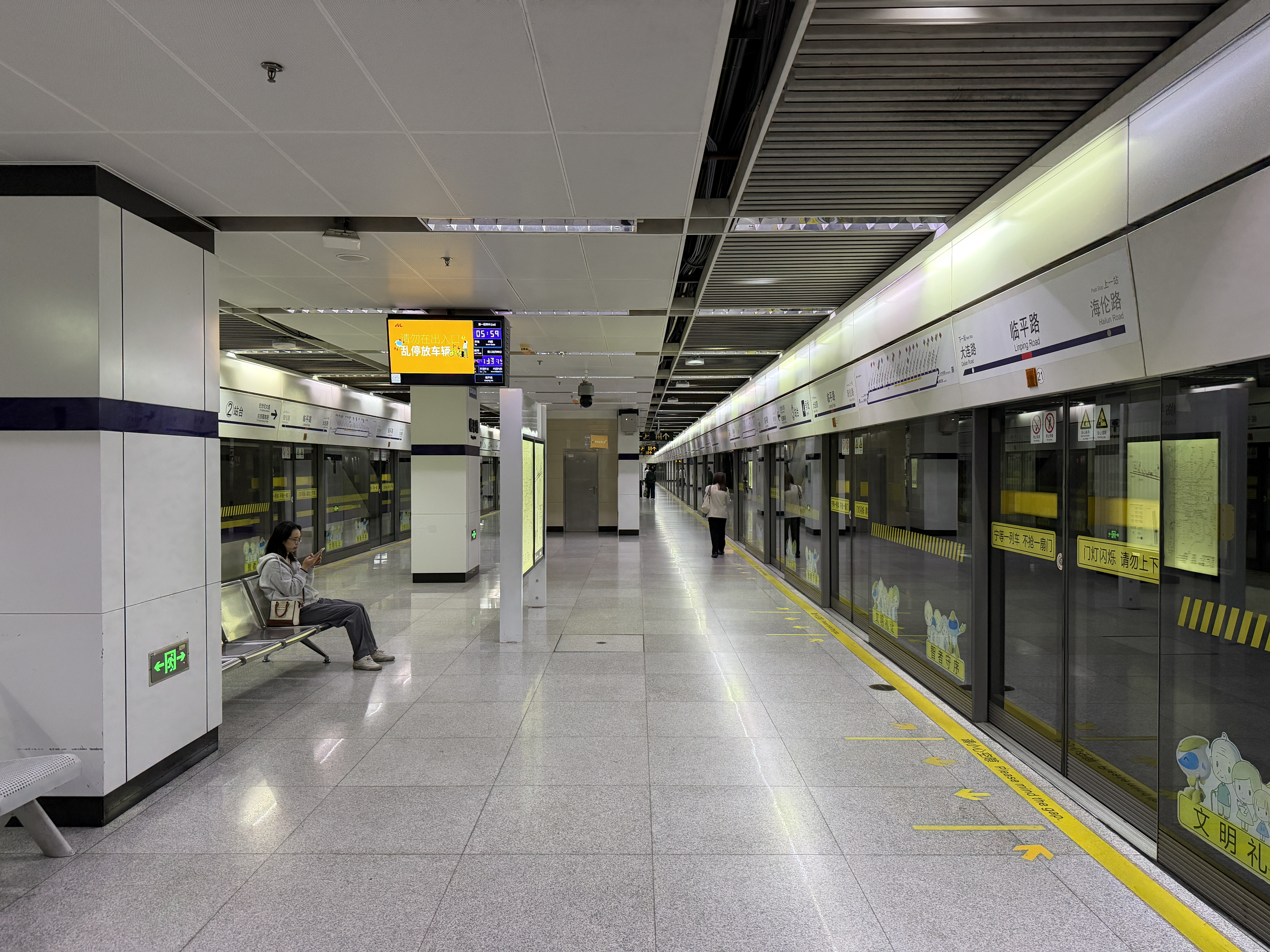
- Station platform

General information
- Location: Linping Road and Feihong Road (飞虹路); Hongkou District, Shanghai; China
- Coordinates: 31°15′40″N 121°30′02″E
- Operator: Shanghai No. 3 Metro Operation Co. Ltd.
- Line: Line 4
- Platforms: 3 (1 island platform and 1 side platform)
- Tracks: 3

Construction
- Structure type: Underground
- Accessible: Yes

History
- Opened: 31 December 2005; 20 years ago

Services
Preceding station	Shanghai Metro	Following station
Dalian Road Clockwise	Line 4	Hailun Road Counter-clockwise
Location
- Location within Shanghai

Linping Road (simplified Chinese: 临平路; traditional Chinese: 臨平路; pinyin: Línpíng Lù) is a station on Shanghai Metro Line 4. Service began at this station on 31 December 2005.

The station has 3 tracks, one island platform, and one side platform. The inner island platform is not in service. Trains heading clockwise use the outer island platform, whilst trains heading anticlockwise use the side platform. This station is the only station on Line 4 to have 3 platforms.

== Station Layout ==
G	Entrances and Exits	Exits 1-4
B1	Concourse	Faregates, Station Agent
B2	Side platform, doors open on the right
B2	Counterclockwise	← Line 4 to Hailun Road
B2		Not in service
B2	Island platform, doors open on the left
B2	Clockwise	Line 4 to Dalian Road →
