= Jingxing Road Mosque =

Former mosque in Yangpu, Shanghai, China

- 景星路清真寺

Religion
- Affiliation: Islam
- Branch/tradition: Sunni

Location
- Location: No. 117, Lane 302, Jingxing Road, Yangpu District, Shanghai, China

Architecture
- Type: mosque
- Completed: 1947

The Jingxing Road Mosque (Chinese: 景星路清真寺; pinyin: Jǐngxīng Lù Qīngzhēnsì) was a mosque in Yangpu District, Shanghai, China.

== History ==
The mosque was established in 1947.

== Architecture ==
The mosque was located at a land area of 132 m^{2} with a total build up area of 185 m^{2}.

== See also ==
- Islam in China
- List of mosques in China
