= Yuanshen Road station =

Metro station in Shanghai, China

Yuanshen Road 源深路
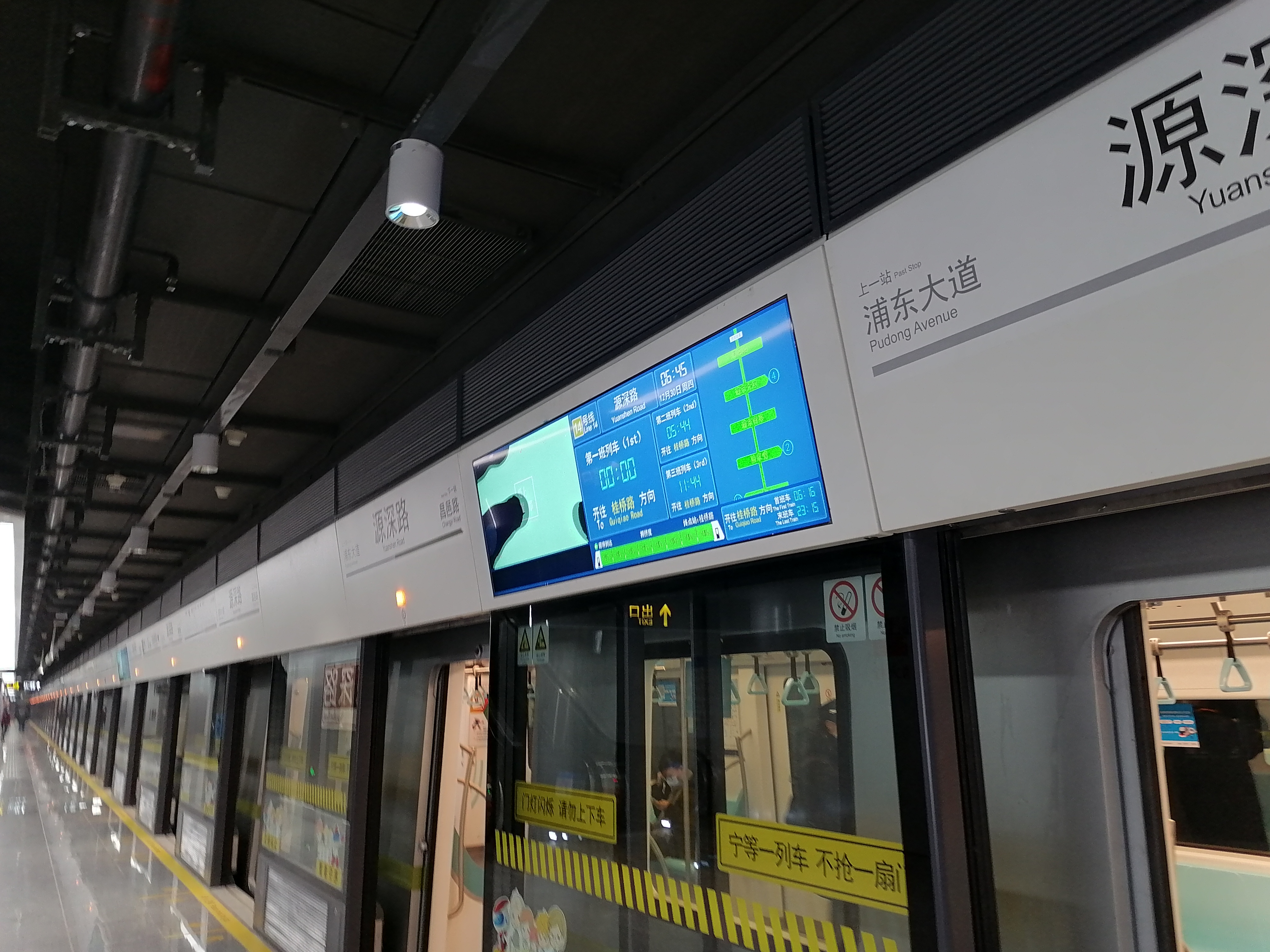
- Platform of Yuanshen Road station

General information
- Location: Yuanshen Road and Pudong Avenue, Pudong, Shanghai; China
- Coordinates: 31.243090°N 121.524856°E
- Line: Line 14
- Platforms: 2 (2 Side platforms)
- Tracks: 2

Construction
- Structure type: Underground
- Accessible: Yes

History
- Opened: 30 December 2021

Services
Preceding station	Shanghai Metro	Following station
Pudong Avenue towards Fengbang	Line 14	Changyi Road towards Guiqiao Road
Location

Yuanshen Road (Chinese: 源深路) is a station that is part of Line 14 of the Shanghai Metro. Located at the intersection of Yuanshen Road and Pudong Avenue in Pudong, the station opened with the rest of Line 14 on December 30, 2021.
