= Lu Xun Museum =

Lu Xun Museum may refer to:

- Beijing Lu Xun Museum
- Shanghai Lu Xun Museum, in Lu Xun Park
- Shaoxing Lu Xun Museum, at the Lu Xun birthplace
