= Former Residence of Lu Xun =

The Former Residence of Lu Xun can refer to any of the following places which the Chinese writer Lu Xun had lived in, including the following:

- Former Residence of Lu Xun (Shanghai)
- Former Residence of Lu Xun (Beijing)
