= Lu Xun Park =

Park in Shanghai, China

Coordinates: 31°16′22.21″N 121°28′42.33″E

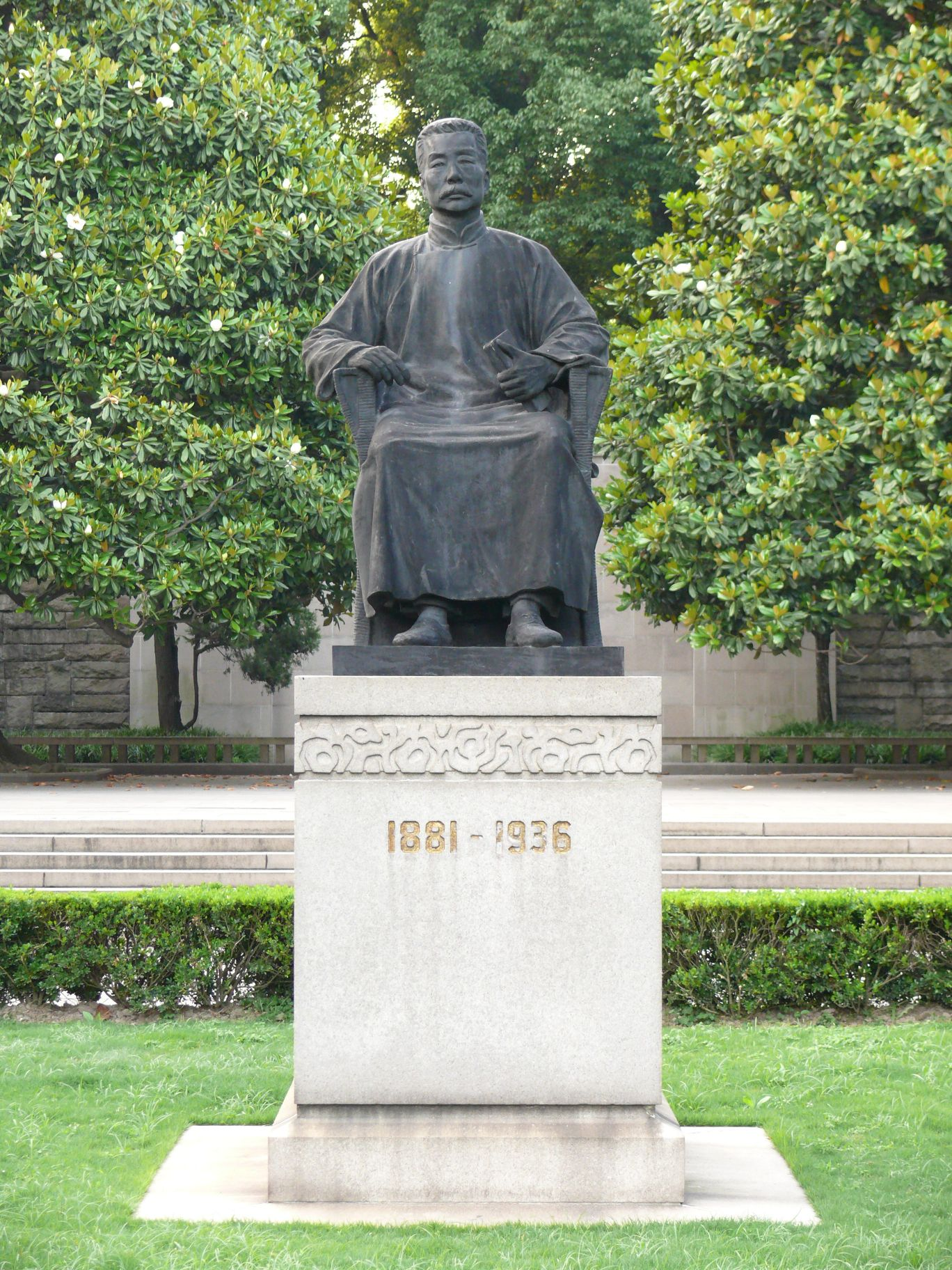
- Interactive map of Lu Xun Park
- Location: Shanghai
- Public transit: Hongkou Football Stadium Station

Lu Xun Park
- Simplified Chinese: 鲁迅公园
- Traditional Chinese: 魯迅公園
Transcriptions
Standard Mandarin
- Hanyu Pinyin: Lǔ Xùn Gōngyuán

Hongkou Park
- Simplified Chinese: 虹口公园
- Traditional Chinese: 虹口公園
Transcriptions
Standard Mandarin
- Hanyu Pinyin: Hóngkǒu gōngyuán

Lu Xun Park, formerly Hongkou (Hongkew) Park, is a municipal park in Hongkou District of Shanghai, China. It is located on 146 East Jiangwan Road, right behind Hongkou Football Stadium. It is bounded by Guangzhong Road to the north, Ouyang Road to the northeast, Tian'ai Road to the southeast, Tian'ai Branch Road to the south, and East Jiangwan Road to the west. The park is named after the Chinese writer Lu Xun, who lived nearby in the last years of his life, and is the location of the tomb of Lu Xun and the Lu Xun Museum. In 1932, Korean nationalist Yun Bong-gil detonated a bomb at the park, killing or injuring several high-ranking figures of the Imperial Japanese military during a celebration of Emperor Hirohito's birthday.

Lu Xun Park is just north of Duolun Road, a historic street that is now a car-free zone. It is also located near Lu Xun's former residence, a three-story Japanese-style home where the author lived from 1933 until his death in 1936.

== Features ==
Lu Xun Park contains the tomb of Lu Xun, with an inscription by Mao Zedong. On either side of the tomb are trees planted by Zhou Enlai and Lu Xun's widow, Xu Guangping. Near the tomb is a bronze statue of Lu Xun. The center of the park consists of a small artificial lake where boat rides are offered. Locals often use the park for exercise, and can be seen practicing tai chi and ballroom dancing. The Te Li Ming Teahouse is located on the west side of the lake. In the southeast corner of the park is the Lu Xun Memorial Hall, which contains a collection of his personal belongings, papers, and publications.

The park also contains a plum garden, a memorial hall dedicated to Yun Bong-gil, and a bust of the Hungarian revolutionary poet Sándor Petőfi, some of whose works Lu Xun translated into Chinese. The bust was unveiled by Hungarian Prime Minister Ferenc Gyurcsány in 2007 as part of the preparations for the Shanghai Expo. Lu Xun Park is home to several hundred cherry trees, some of which are Yoshino trees transplanted from Ueno Park in Tokyo.

== History ==
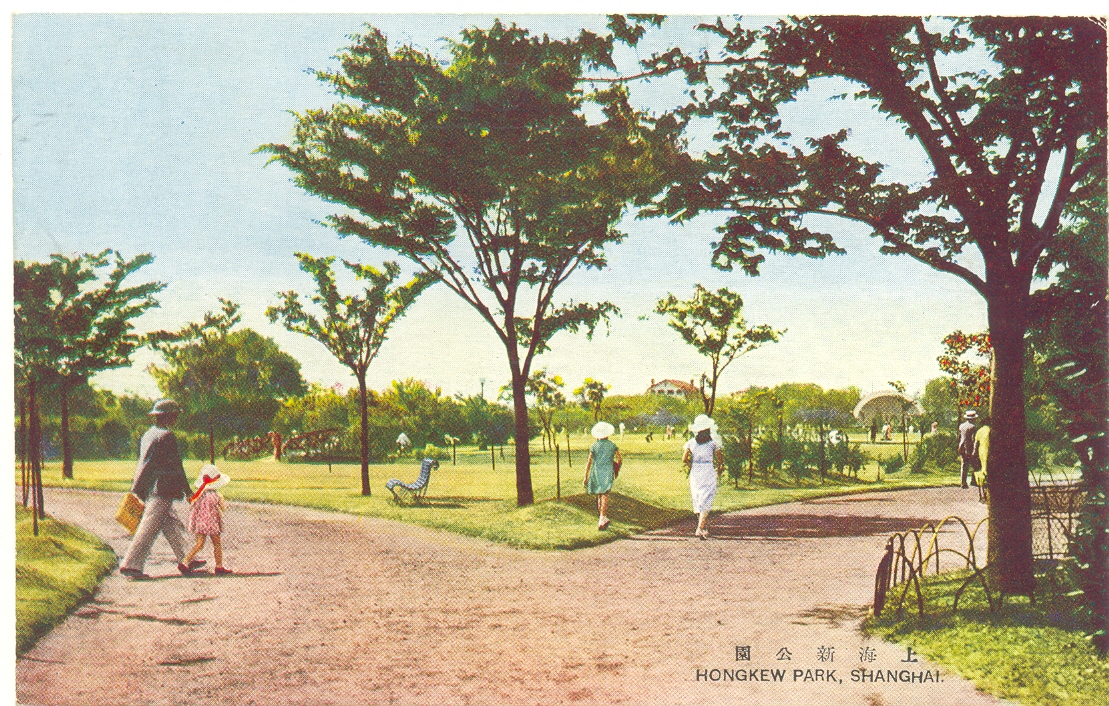
Early 20th-century postcard depicting Hongkou Park

In 1896, the Bureau of Construction of the Shanghai International Settlement purchased 39 acres of land in Hongkou (formerly romanized as Hongkew) just outside its boundary to use as a shooting range for the Shanghai Volunteer Corps. The field was redesigned by Donald MacGregor as the Hongkew Sports Games Park and Shooting Field in 1905, and completed in 1909. The new design was based on that of a park in Glasgow, and included a golf course, tennis courts, swimming pool, and bowling green. The park was expanded in 1917, and renamed again as Hongkew Park in 1922. It was the second largest park in Shanghai, next to Jessfield Park (now called Zhongshan Park). Both parks, despite lying in Chinese territory outside of the International Settlement, were administered by the Shanghai Municipal Council, the organization that governed the Settlement on behalf of the foreign community.

The Shanghai Municipal Band, the predecessor of the Shanghai Symphony Orchestra, performed summer concerts at Hongkou Park and the Public Garden (now Huangpu Park). These were attended by the foreign residents of the International Settlement, as Chinese residents were not permitted to enter either park. Hongkou Park, along with the other parks administered by the Shanghai Municipal Council, was opened to Chinese visitors for the first time in 1928.

The pre-1928 prohibition against Chinese visitors in foreign-administered Shanghai parks was the subject of much debate among Chinese intellectuals. The park regulations stated that the facilities were exclusively for the use of the foreign community, and also that dogs, horses, and bicycles were prohibited. Critics later paraphrased these regulations into various fictitious versions such as "Dogs and Chinese not admitted", juxtaposing the low status of Chinese citizens in their own country with that of dogs. Sun Yat-sen, founder of the Republic of China, denounced the restrictions in effect at the Garden and at Hongkou Park in a speech in 1924. Most famously, Bruce Lee's film Fist of Fury depicted Lee's character being barred from entry into the Public Garden, resulting in him kicking and breaking the sign displaying the regulations.

The second and fifth Far Eastern Championship Games were held at Hongkou Park in 1915 and 1921, respectively. The 1915 games were a major priority for the Beiyang government under Yuan Shikai, as well as for Chinese media covering the event. Yuan had agreed to Japan's Twenty-One Demands just prior to the games, leaving the Chinese crowds in attendance eager for victory against their Japanese opponents on the field. The 1915 games were among the earliest international sporting competitions to be held in China. They attracted a large number of spectators to the new stadium built near the Hongkou shooting range.

The 1921 games were notable for being the first to include female athletes, though their participation was limited to performing group calisthenics demonstrations with movements mimicking those of modern sports. The closing ceremony was disrupted by six Hunanese anarchists who fired a gun outside Hongkou Park and distributed anti-capitalist pamphlets.

=== Japanese occupation ===
Japanese settlement in Shanghai was predominantly concentrated in the Hongkou area. During the January 28 Incident of 1932, the Japanese military occupied much of Hongkou, and constructed a fortified base for the Imperial Japanese Navy near Hongkou Park. When Japan invaded China in 1937, much of the fighting during the opening Battle of Shanghai centered around the Japanese marine headquarters there, and around nearby North Sichuan Road. Hongkou remained under Japanese control until the end of World War II.

=== Bombing incident ===
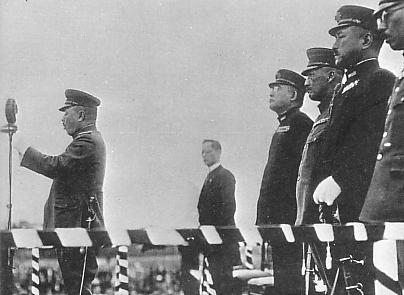
Japanese VIPs at Hongkou Park shortly before the bombing

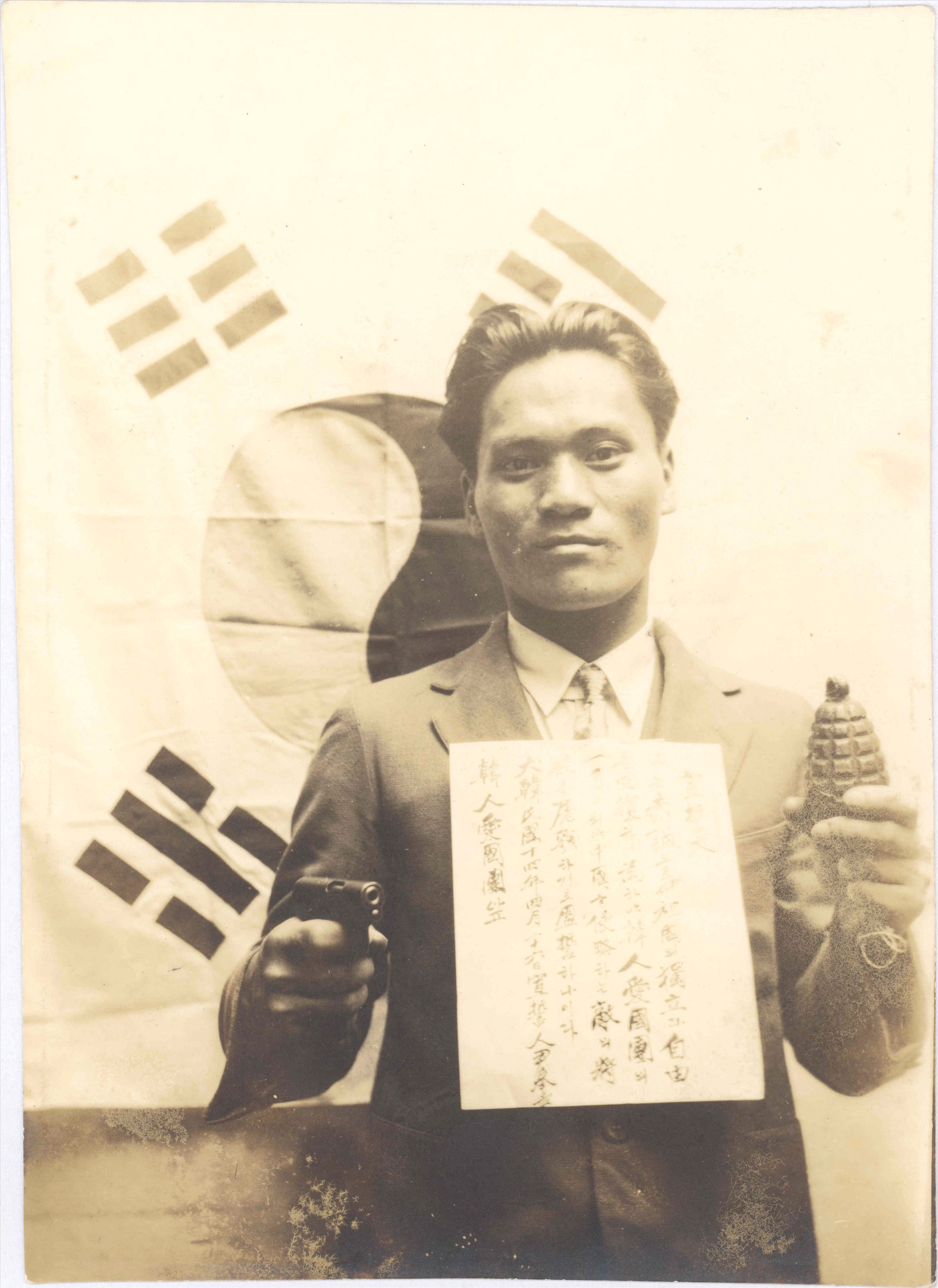
Yun Bong-gil

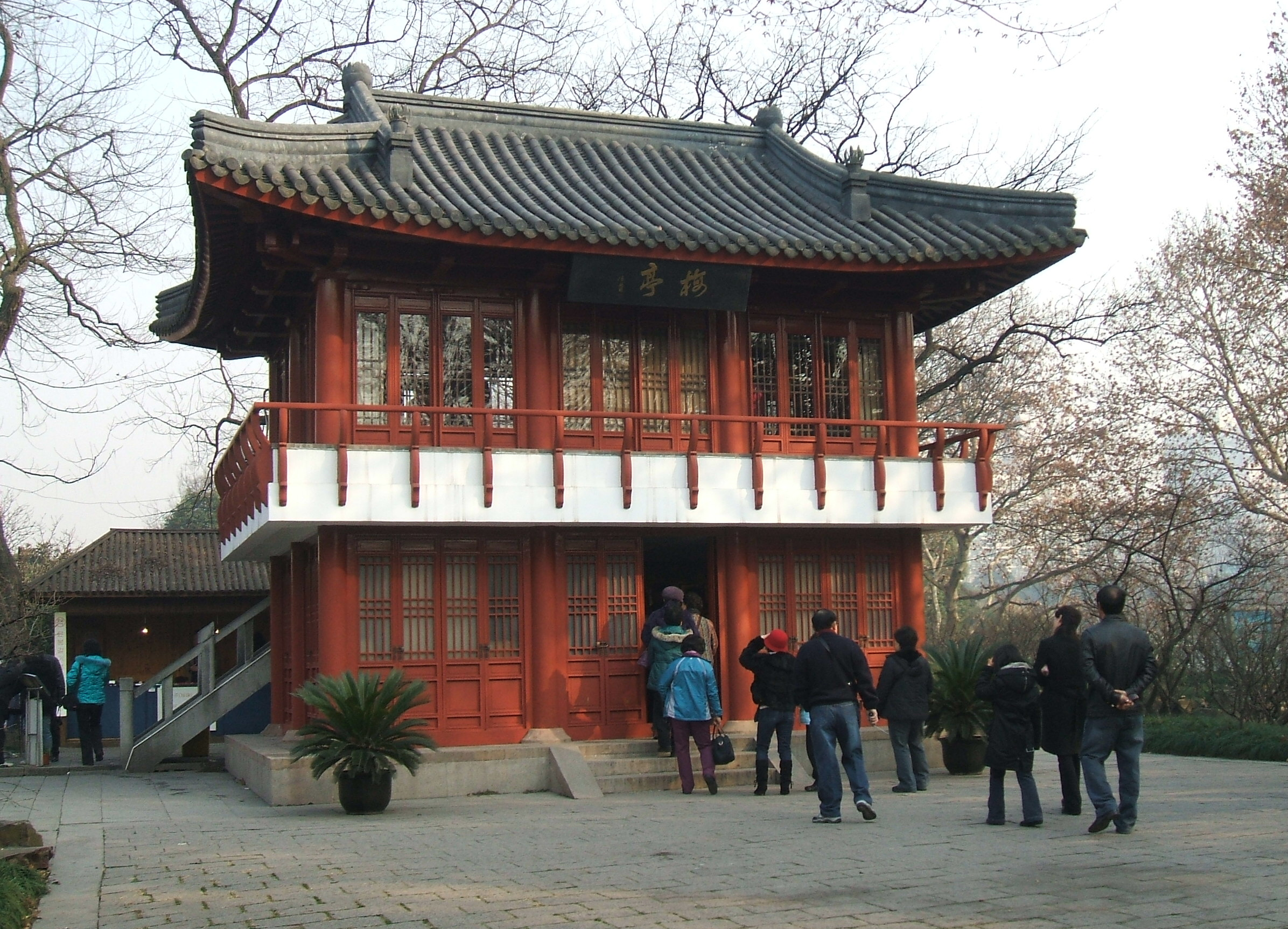
Yun Bong-gil Memorial Hall

On April 29, 1932, the Japanese military held a celebration of the birthday of Emperor Hirohito in Hongkou Park. Among the attendees were General Yoshinori Shirakawa, commander in chief of the Shanghai Expeditionary Army; Kawabata Teiji, government chancellor of Japanese residents in Shanghai; Kenkichi Ueda, commander of the 9th Division of the Imperial Japanese Army; Vice Admiral Kichisaburō Nomura of the Imperial Japanese Navy; and Mamoru Shigemitsu, diplomat. Yun Bong-gil, a Korean independence activist opposed to Japanese rule over Korea, entered the park carrying two bombs hidden in a lunchbox and a water bottle. After the Japanese national anthem had finished playing, Yun threw the water bottle bomb at the dais where the Japanese officials were gathered, and detonated it.

Shirakawa and Kawabata were killed in the explosion. Nomura, who later served as ambassador to the United States at the time of the Japanese attack on Pearl Harbor, was blinded in his right eye. Mamoru lost a leg; in 1945, as Japan's Minister for Foreign Affairs, he signed the Japanese Instrument of Surrender that marked the end of World War II, walking on the deck of the USS Missouri with an artificial leg and cane. Yun Bong-gil was arrested at the scene, taken to Japan, and executed.

In 2003, a two-story memorial hall dedicated to Yun Bong-gil was opened in the park with the support of the Chinese and South Korean governments. After a renovation, it was reopened in 2015 at a ceremony marking the 83rd anniversary of the bombing. The incident is also commemorated on a stone tablet featuring a bilingual inscription in Chinese and Korean.

=== Dedication to Lu Xun ===
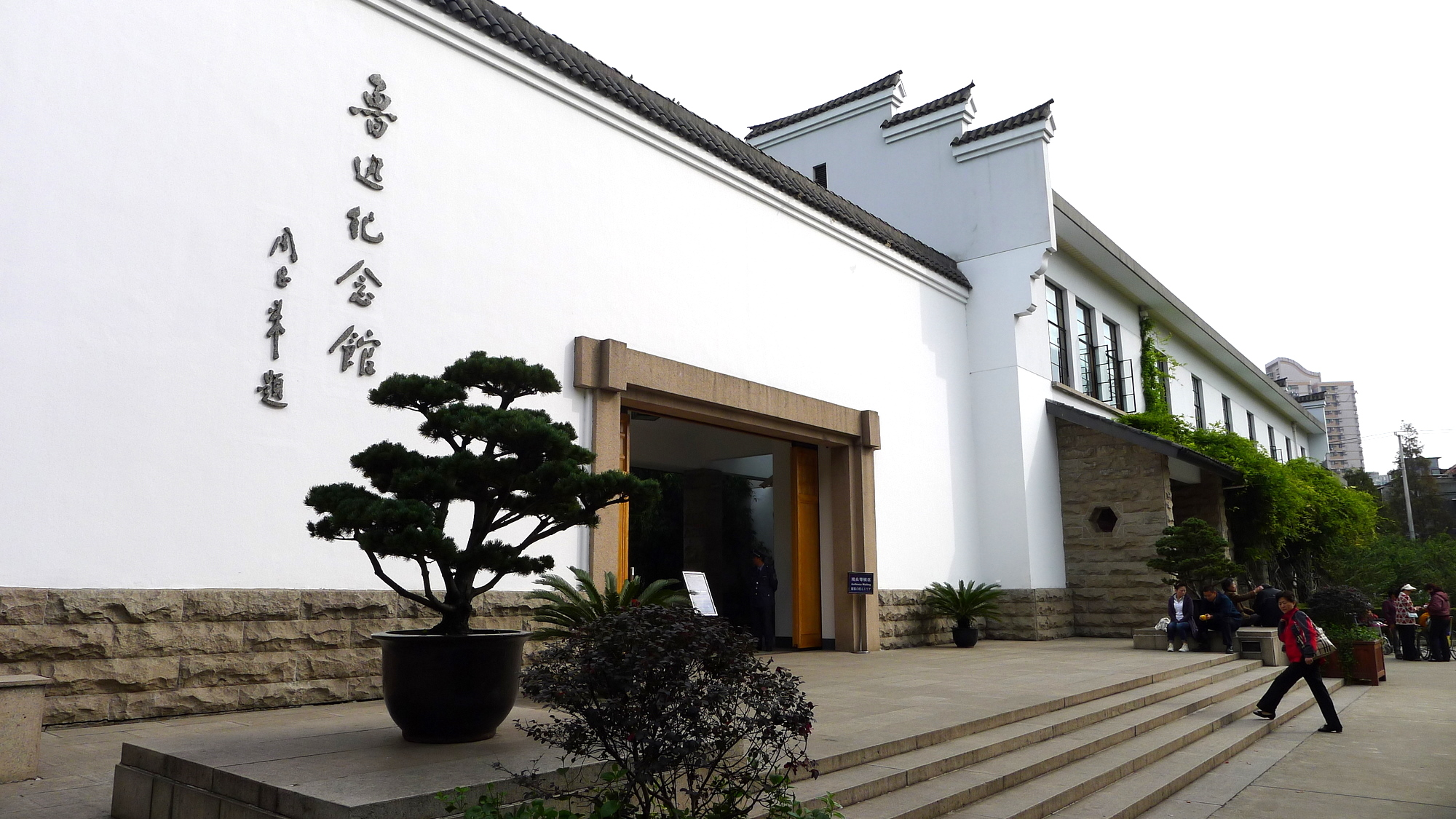
Lu Xun Memorial Hall

Lu Xun lived in Hongkou near the park in the last years of his life, having moved from Guangzhou to Shanghai's International Settlement to find refuge after the Kuomintang government initiated a purge of leftist intellectuals and communist party members in several Chinese cities under their control in 1927. He co-founded the League of Left-Wing Writers in 1930 at the Chinese Arts University on nearby Duolun Road.

After his death in 1936, Lu Xun was originally buried in the International Cemetery (Wanguo Cemetery). By this point, his reputation as a popular intellectual was already well-established. His coffin was draped in a white flag with the words "The Soul of the Nation" written on it. Lu Xun remained a potent political symbol of the left after his death, particularly after the establishment of the People's Republic of China under the Communist Party in 1949. The party canonized him as a heroic figure, praising his works and quoting him selectively for its own purposes.

The Lu Xun Memorial Hall (or Museum) was constructed inside Hongkou Park in 1951, and in 1956, Lu Xun's remains were reinterred in the park to mark the 20th anniversary of his death. The new tomb's inscription ("鲁迅先生之墓", "The Tomb of Mr. Lu Xun") was written in the calligraphy of Mao Zedong. The Beijing Lu Xun Museum was also established that year, at the site of Lu Xun's former home in Beijing. Lu Xun's tomb is one of the historical and cultural sites protected at the national level in Shanghai. The park was renamed Lu Xun Park in 1988.

== Transportation ==
The park can be reached by taking Shanghai Metro Line 3 or 8 to Hongkou Football Stadium Station.

== Gallery ==
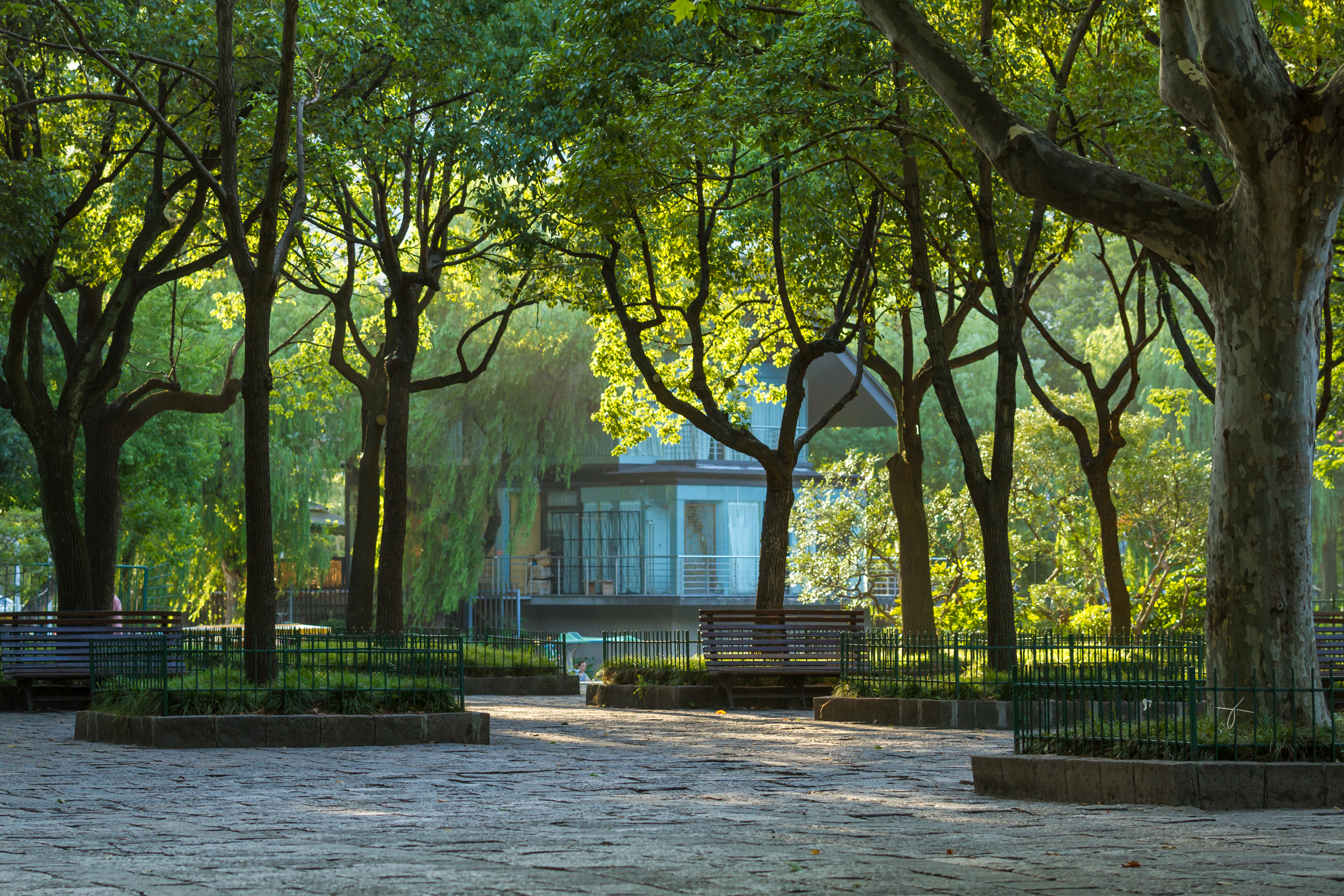

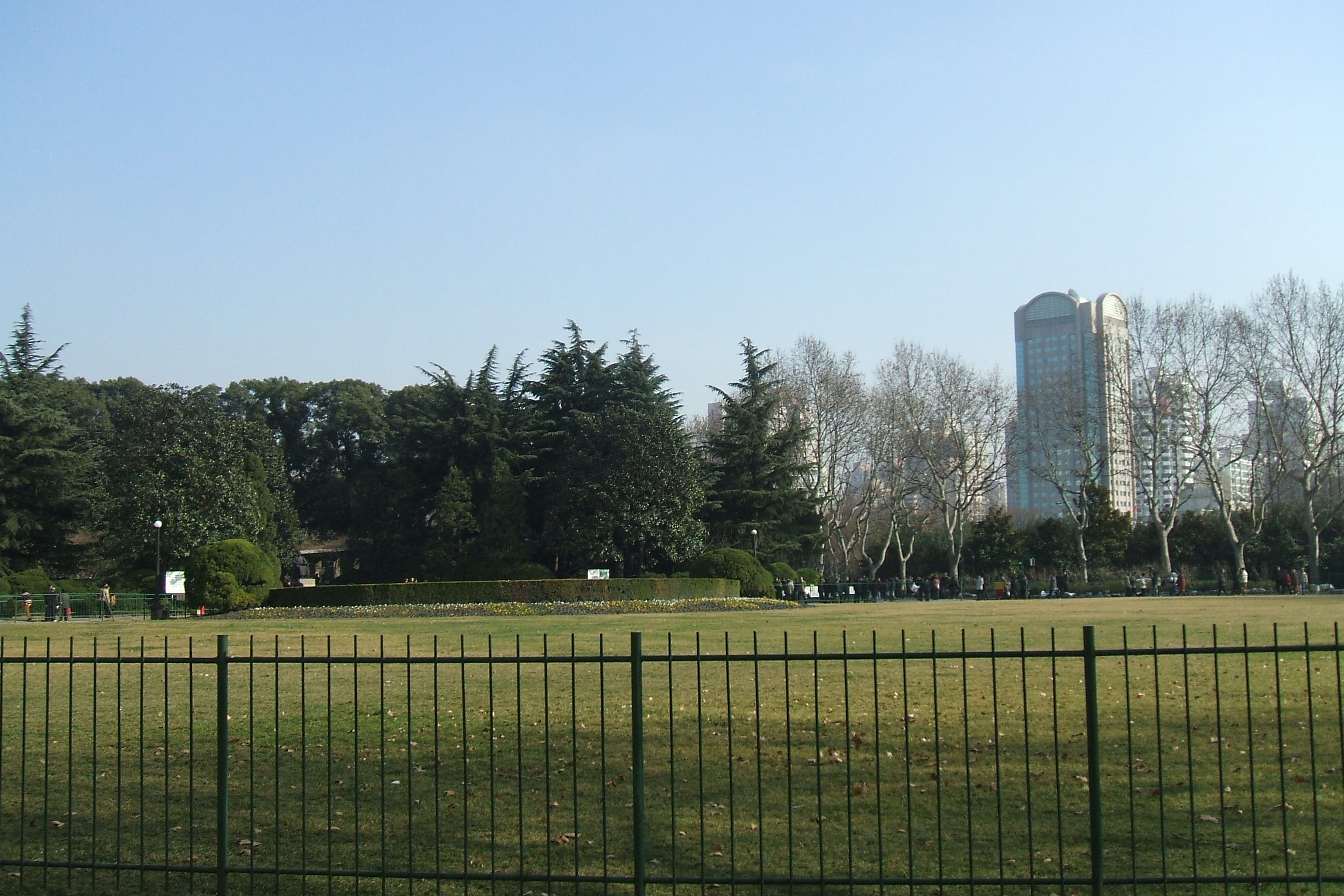

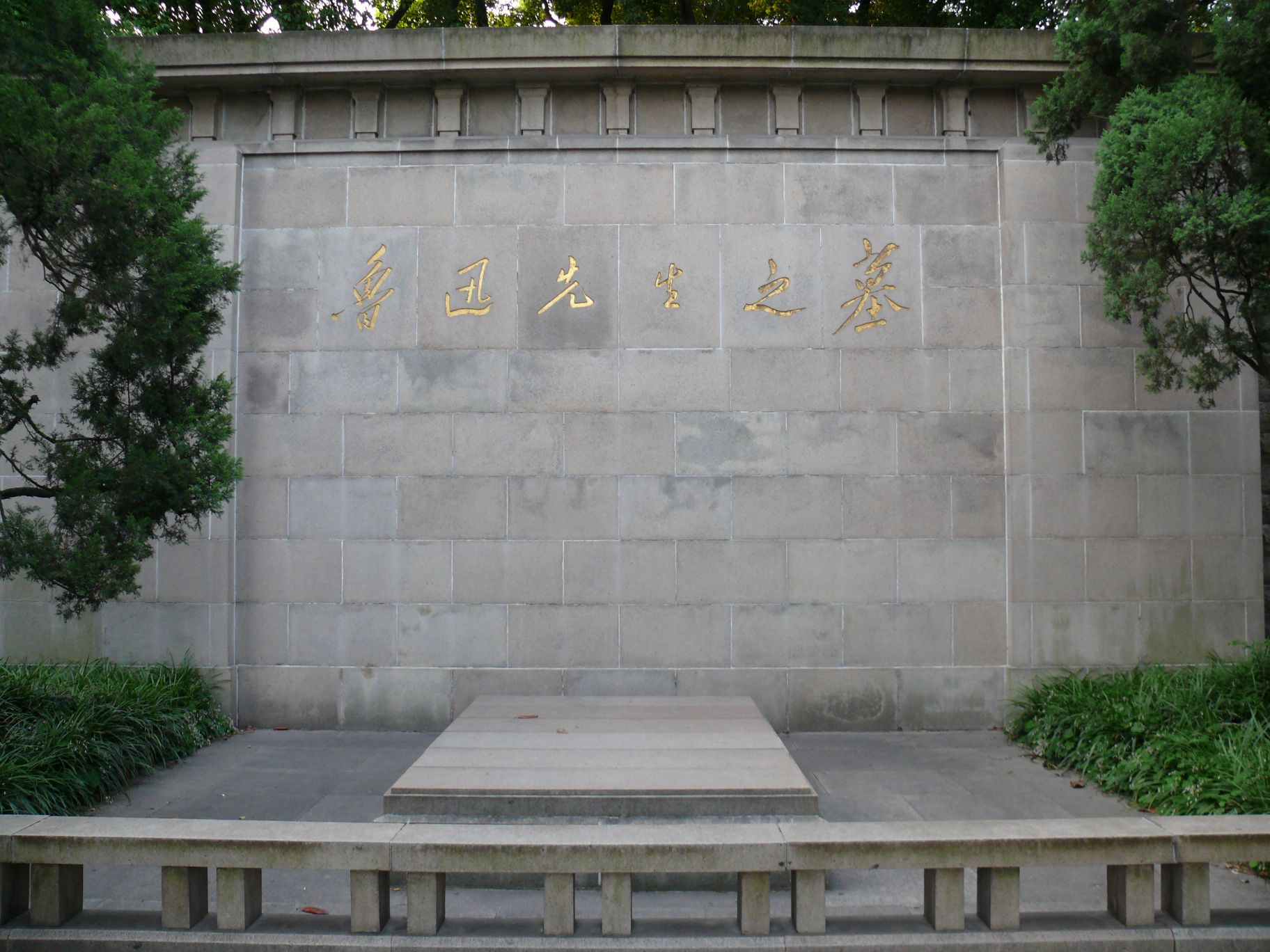
Lu Xun's tomb

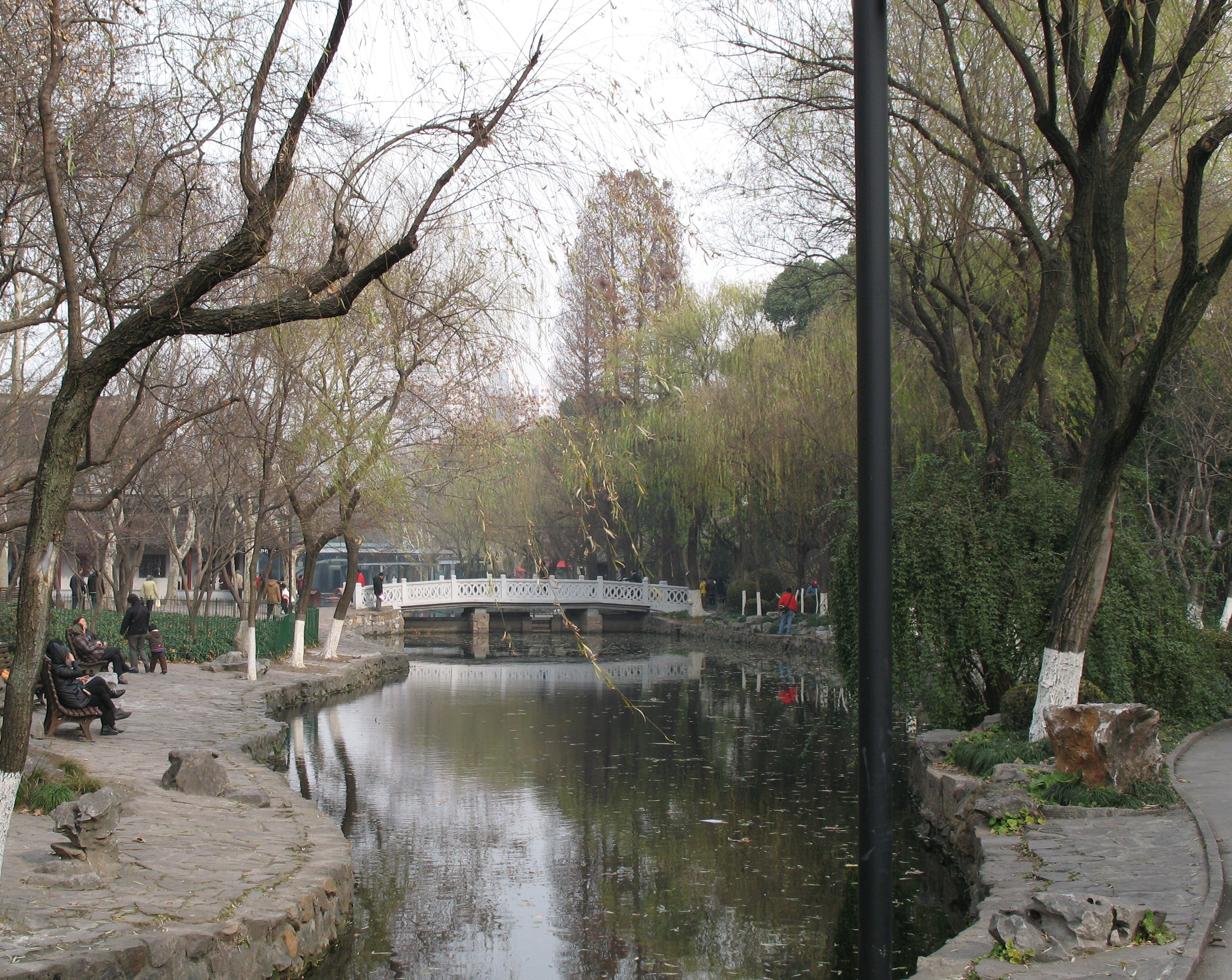

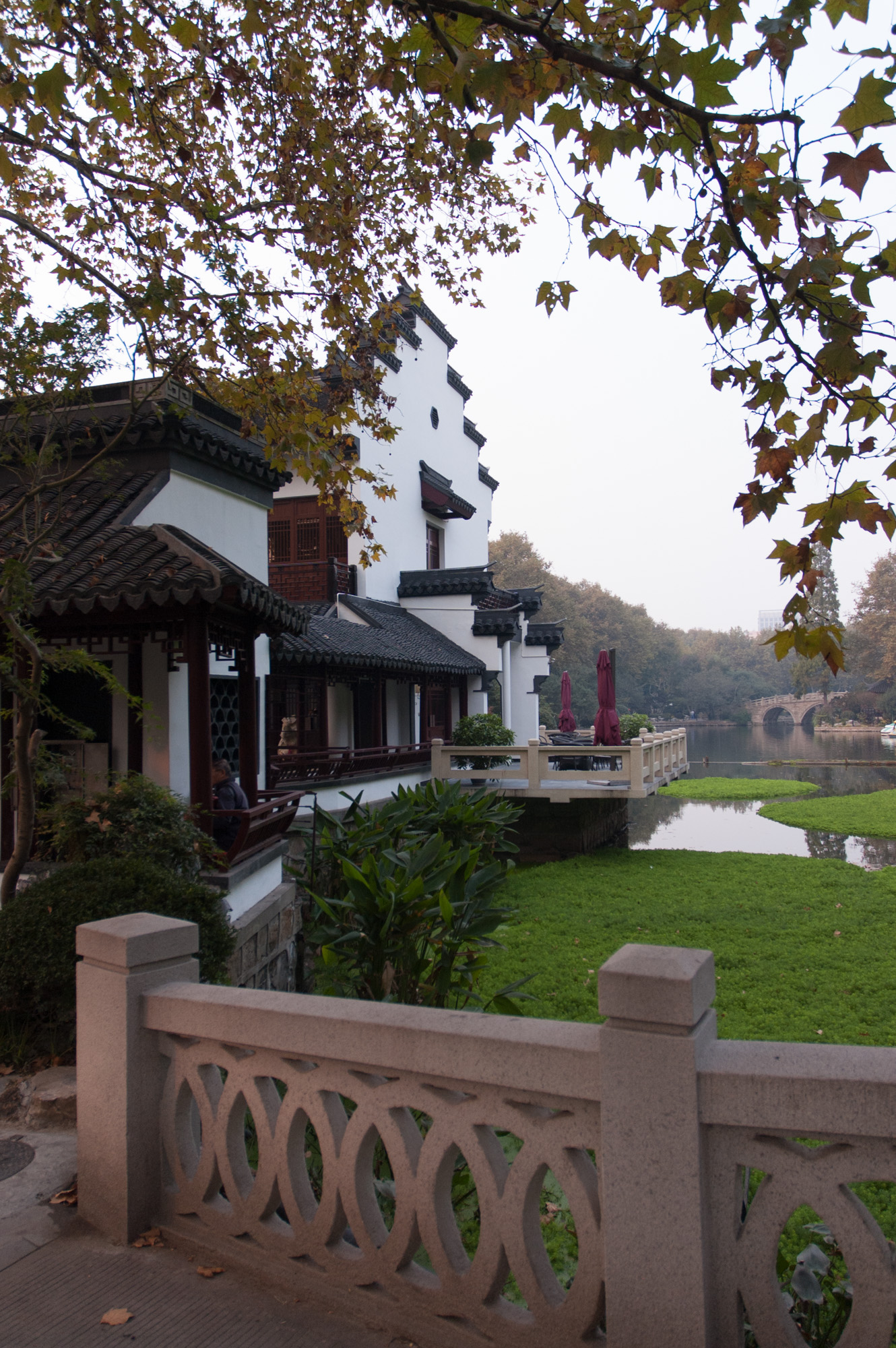
Te Li Ming Teahouse

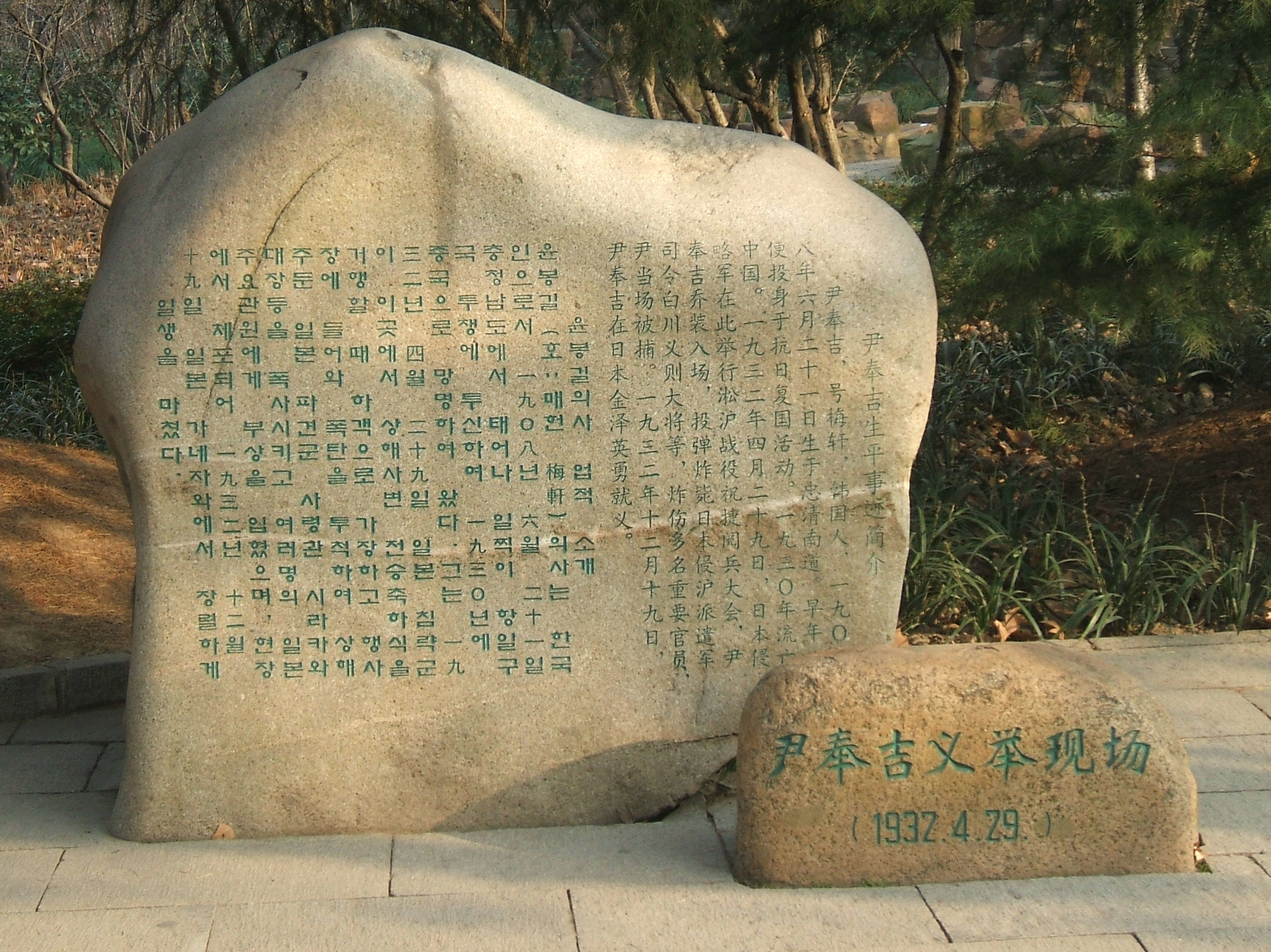
Stone commemorating the bombing incident

== See also ==
- Former Residence of Lu Xun (Shanghai)
- Lu Xun Park (Qingdao)
