= Duolun Road =

Street in Shanghai, China

Coordinates: 31.2620°N 121.4823°E

Duolun Road (simplified Chinese: 多伦路; traditional Chinese: 多倫路; pinyin: Duōlún Lù; Shanghainese: Dulen Lu), formerly Darroch Road (窦乐安路; 竇樂安路), is a historic street in Hongkou District, Shanghai, China.

== Location ==
Laid in 1911, the road is 550 metres long. Both ends of the L-shaped road join to North Sichuan Road near Lu Xun Park and Hongkou Stadium. The road is today reconstructed as a pedestrian street.

== History ==
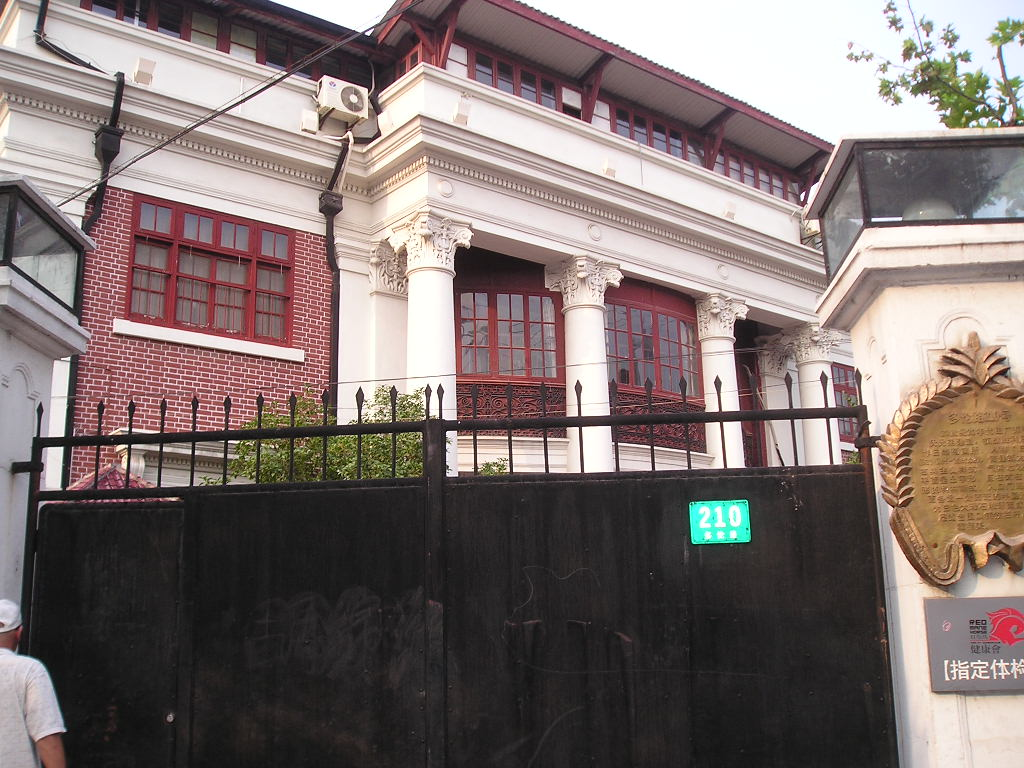
210 Duolun Rd, former residence of Bai Chongxi

Darroch (Duolun) Road was built by the Shanghai Municipal Council, the municipal authority of the Shanghai International Settlement. It was an "extra-settlement road" (Chinese: 越界筑路), built outside the boundaries of the International Settlement, but over which the Settlement authorities had extraterritorial jurisdiction. It was named after John Darroch, a British missionary to China who had been received by the Guangxu Emperor of the Qing Dynasty. A primarily residential street, the golden age of the road was in the 1920s and 30s, when it attracted writers and other prominent residents, giving it a reputation as a vibrant centre of thought and literature.

In 1943, during the Second Sino-Japanese War, the puppet government collaborating with the Japanese occupation changed the road name to "Duolun", after a county in Inner Mongolia. It became an ordinary residential street, until a revived interest in Republican-era history led at the end of the 20th century to it becoming a popular tourist and shopping destination, and the closure of the street to traffic.

== Notable residents ==
In the early 20th century, many writers and celebrities lived in the area around Darroch Road. Among them were famous writers, namely Lu Xun, Guo Moruo, Mao Dun, Ye Shengtao, and Wang Zaoshi, as well as members of the influential League of Left-Wing Writers including Ding Ling, Sha Ding and Qu Qiubai. The League itself was founded on Darroch Road. High-ranking political and military leaders H. H. Kung, Bai Chongxi, Tang Enbo and Chen Yi also lived there.

== Architecture ==
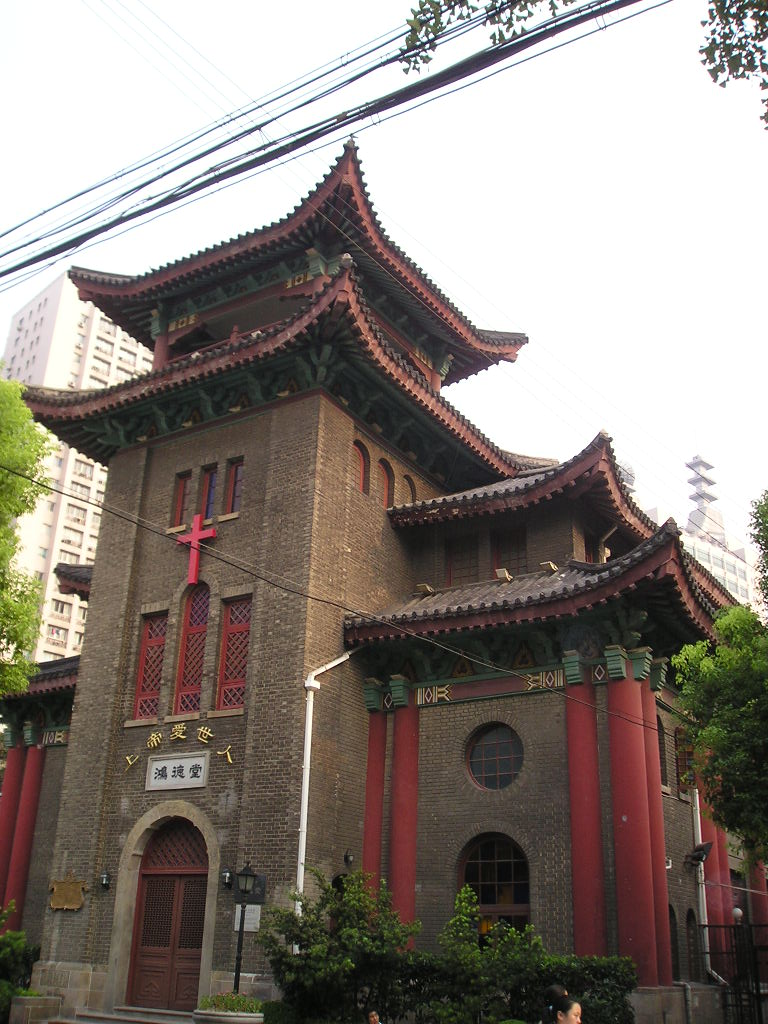
Fitch Memorial Church

Duolun Road is representative of the historic architecture of the 20th century in Shanghai. A number of larger private residences were initially built by Chinese industrialists, and many were later purchased by political and military personalities. Prominent private residences include the Islamic-style influenced former residence of H.H. Kung; No. 210, which was for a time the home of Bai Chongxi (and Pai Hsien-yung); and the French neoclassical former residence of Tang Enbo.

Fitch Memorial Church (called "Hongde Tang" (鸿德堂) in Chinese), named after George Field Fitch (費啟鴻) is a unique mixture of Chinese and western architectural styles, the only such mixed-style church to survive in Shanghai. The former campus of China Art University (中华艺术大学), in traditional style, was also where the League of Left-Wing Writers was founded. In the surrounding blocks, there is a well-preserved area of dense lilong housing (including both Shikumen and newer styles), showcasing the typical urban texture of Shanghai-style residential architecture.

== Regeneration and Duolun Museum of Modern Art ==
In order to counter degrading infrastructures and to rejuvenate the area, the local government launched a project of regeneration at the end of the century. A project began in 1998 to conserve and restore the historic buildings and turn them into museums, galleries, cafes or craft shops. In the project the local infrastructure was upgraded and new cultural elements such as street sculptures were added to the new pedestrian street. The sites of important historical events and residences of prominent historical people would be made more accessible and open to the public. A museum of modern art (Duolun MOMA) was also part of the project. Pedestrianisation was completed in 1999.

== See also ==
- Former Residence of Lu Xun (Shanghai)
