= Former Residence of Lu Xun (Shanghai) =

Former Residence of Lu Xun in Shanghai
- 上海鲁迅故居
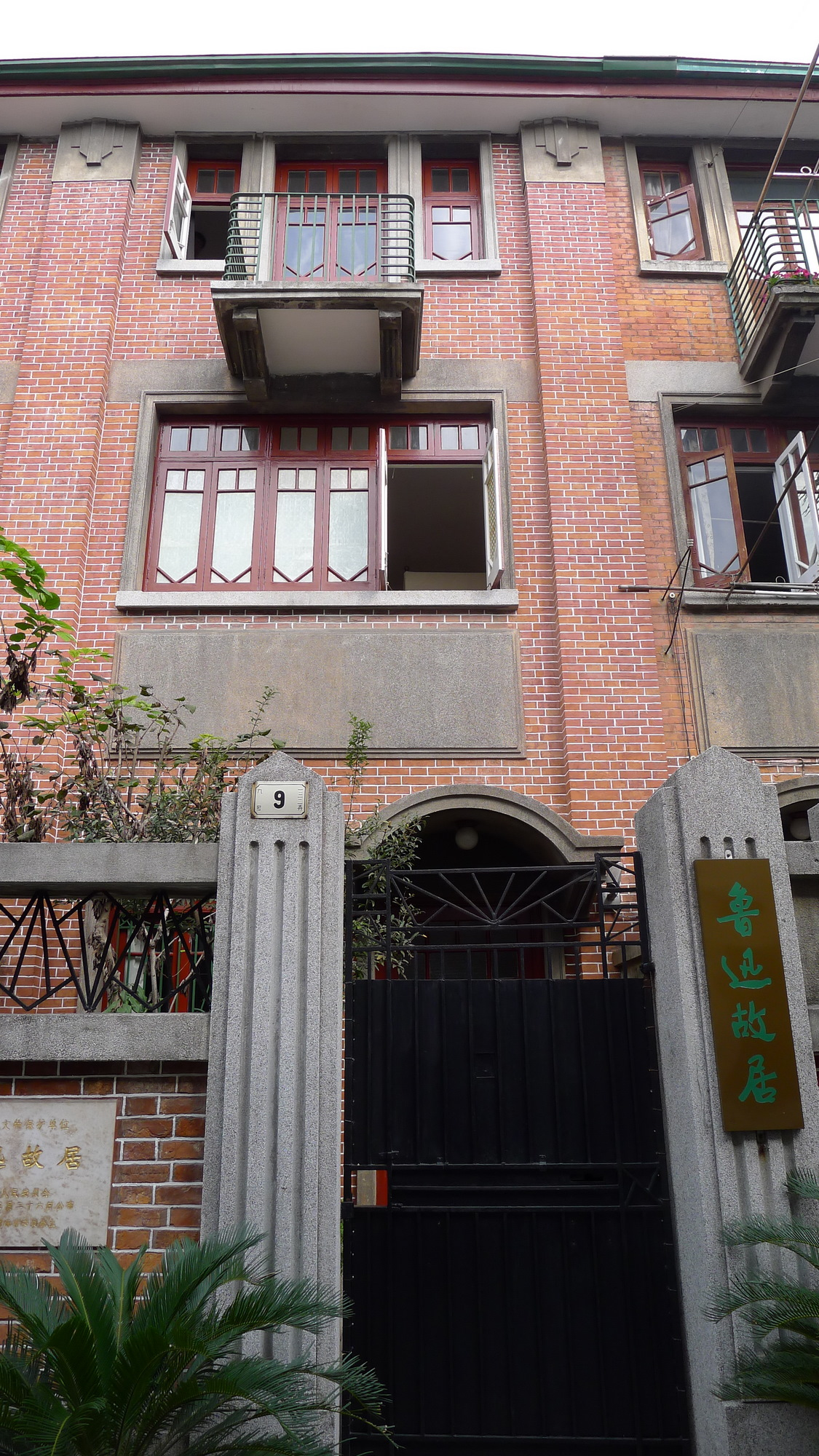
- The Former Residence of Lu Xun in Shanghai
- Interactive map of the Former Residence of Lu Xun in Shanghai area

General information
- Status: Completed
- Type: Museum
- Location: 9 Continental Terrace, Lane 132, Shanyin Road, Hongkou District, Shanghai, China
- Completed: 1931
- Opened: 1950

Technical details
- Floor count: 3
- Floor area: 223 m^{2}

The Former Residence of Lu Xun in Shanghai (Chinese: 上海鲁迅故居) located at 9 Continental Terrace, Lane 132, Shanyin Road, Hongkou District, Shanghai, China, is the former residence of Lu Xun (1881–1936), a noted Chinese writer. Lu lived in the house from 1933 to his death in 1936.

== History ==
Lu settled in Shanghai in October 1927. Lu first lived in a house at 23 Jingyunli (Chinese: 景云里), on Donghengbin Road, Hongkou District. He then moved to Room 2093 of the Beichuan Apartments (Chinese: 北川公寓, formerly known as the Ramous Apartments) on North Sichuan Road. He moved the rented house at 9 Continental Terrace on April 11, 1933. In Shanghai, he published a nine essay collection and a short stories collection called Old Tales Retold (Chinese: 故事新编), and co-founded the League of Left-Wing Writers in 1930 at the Chinese Arts University on nearby Duolun Road. He translated and edited foreign works as well. Lu died in his bed on October 19, 1936, aged 55. The house was opened as a museum to the public in January 1950. It has been listed as a Protected Historical and Cultural Site of Shanghai (Chinese: 上海市文物保护单位) since 1977.

== Layout and nearby ==
The three-story building was constructed using red brick and tiles. It covers an area of 78 m^{2} and has a floor space of 222.72 m^{2}. The first floor is divided into a reception room and a dining room, with the front door facing south. Lu's bedroom and study are located on the second floor. Most of his furniture is still placed as in his day. On a bedroom table is a clock that reads 5.25 am, the exact time of his death; his son occupied the third floor.

In proximity to the house are numerous other attractions dedicated to Lu Xun. These include a monument, a Memorial Hall, a park renamed in his honor, as well as his tomb.

== See also ==
- Beijing Lu Xun Museum
- Lu Xun Native Place
- Duolun Road
