= Lu Xun Native Place =

Childhood home of Lu Xun in Zhejiang, China

Coordinates: 29.9948°N 120.5822°E

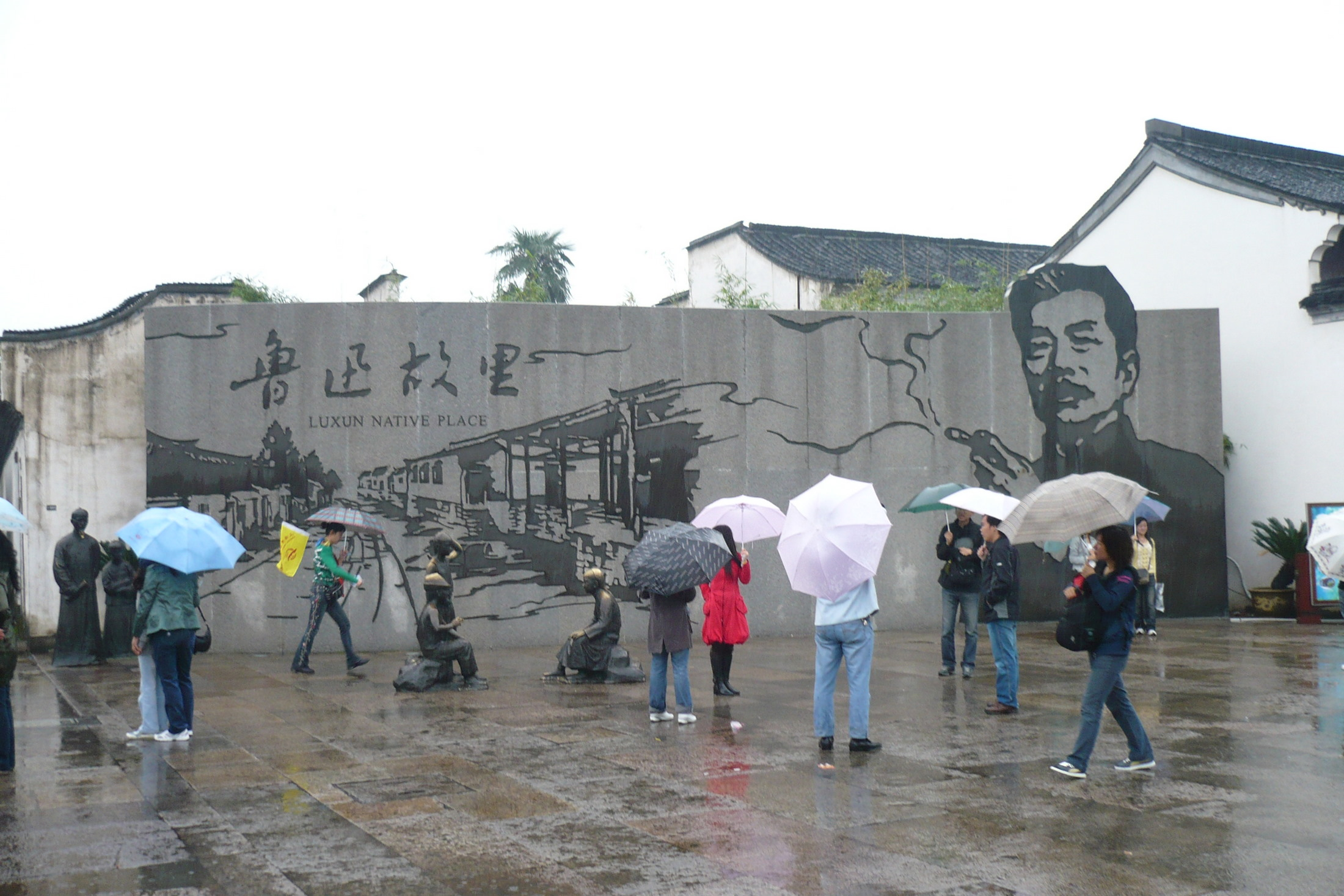
Lu Xun Native Place.

Lu Xun Native Place (Simplify Chinese: 鲁迅故里; pinyin: Luxun Guli) is the childhood home and neighborhood of Lu Xun. Lu Xun is his pen name; his legal name was Zhou Zhangshou, and later renamed himself Zhou Shuren. Lu is one of the foremost writers of Chinese literature in the early 20th century. Lu Xun Native Place is located at 241 Lu Xun Middle Road, Yuecheng District, Shaoxing, Zhejiang Province, China, and has been collected as a national museum and cultural education area. It is the hometown where Lu Xun was born and lived, and it been repaired and protected in 1953.

Lu Xun Native Place covers an area of 500,000 square meters, and includes Lu Xun's former residences, Baicao Garden, Sanwei Study Room, Lu Xun's ancestral residence, Changqing Temple, and Tugu Temple. Lu Xun Native Place retains and restores Lu Xun's original living environment.

== History ==
On 25 September 1881, Lu Xun was born in Shaoxing Lu Xun's former residence west building.

In May 1949, shortly after the establishment of the people's regime in Shaoxing, began to prepare for the construction of Lu Xun Memorial Hall, and gradually carried out the collection of cultural relics of Lu Xun, collection and publicity, research work. The Shaoxing Lu Xun Memorial Museum opened in 1953.

In 2008, after extensive restoration and reconstruction, Lu Xun Native place was opened by the Shaoxing city government. It contains his residence as well as a 50-acre block of related buildings and parks.

Since 1 June 2008, Lu Xun Memorial Museum is free for everyone who has Chinese ID.

Since 2012, Lu Xun Native Place has been classified as a AAAAA scenic area by the China National Tourism Administration. In a typical year, it receives approximately 2 million visitors. It has been visited by notable figures such as Jiang Zemin, Hu Jintao, and Wen Jiabao.

In 2018, Lu Xun's Memorial Museum and scenic area has been open to tourists at night for free.

== Scenic area ==
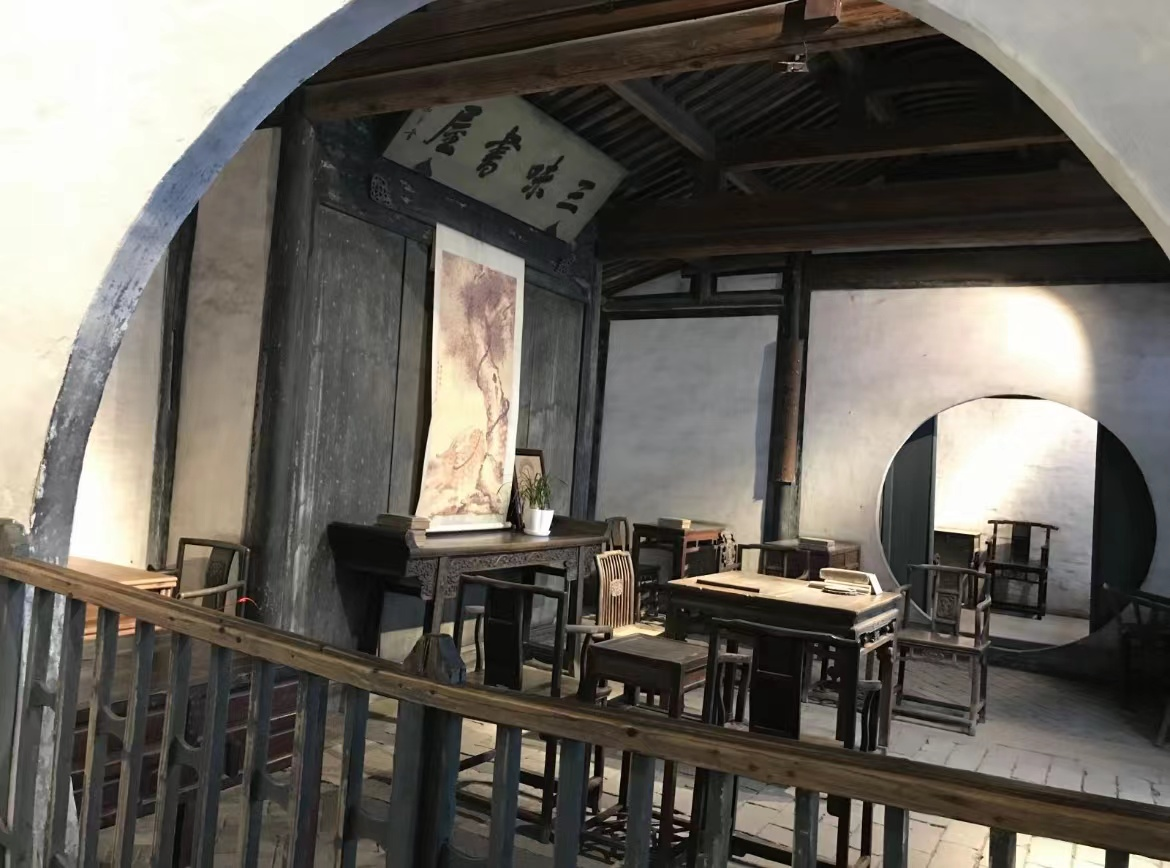
San-wei Study Room and plaque

The area contains the home in which he was born and spent his childhood and teenage years. It also contains his school, Sanwei Study Room, Baicao Garden, Changqing Temple, and Tugu Temple which he often referenced in his writings. He and his entire family lived in this series of courtyards.

Baicao Garden: According to Lu Xun's description in his book 'From Baicao Garden to Sanwei Study Room', this garden was a big courtyard behind his house, with many plants in it. There were houses in back and in front of the garden, and two sides were bounded by white walls. Various grasses and trees grew there, including: mulberries, acacia, garlic etc.

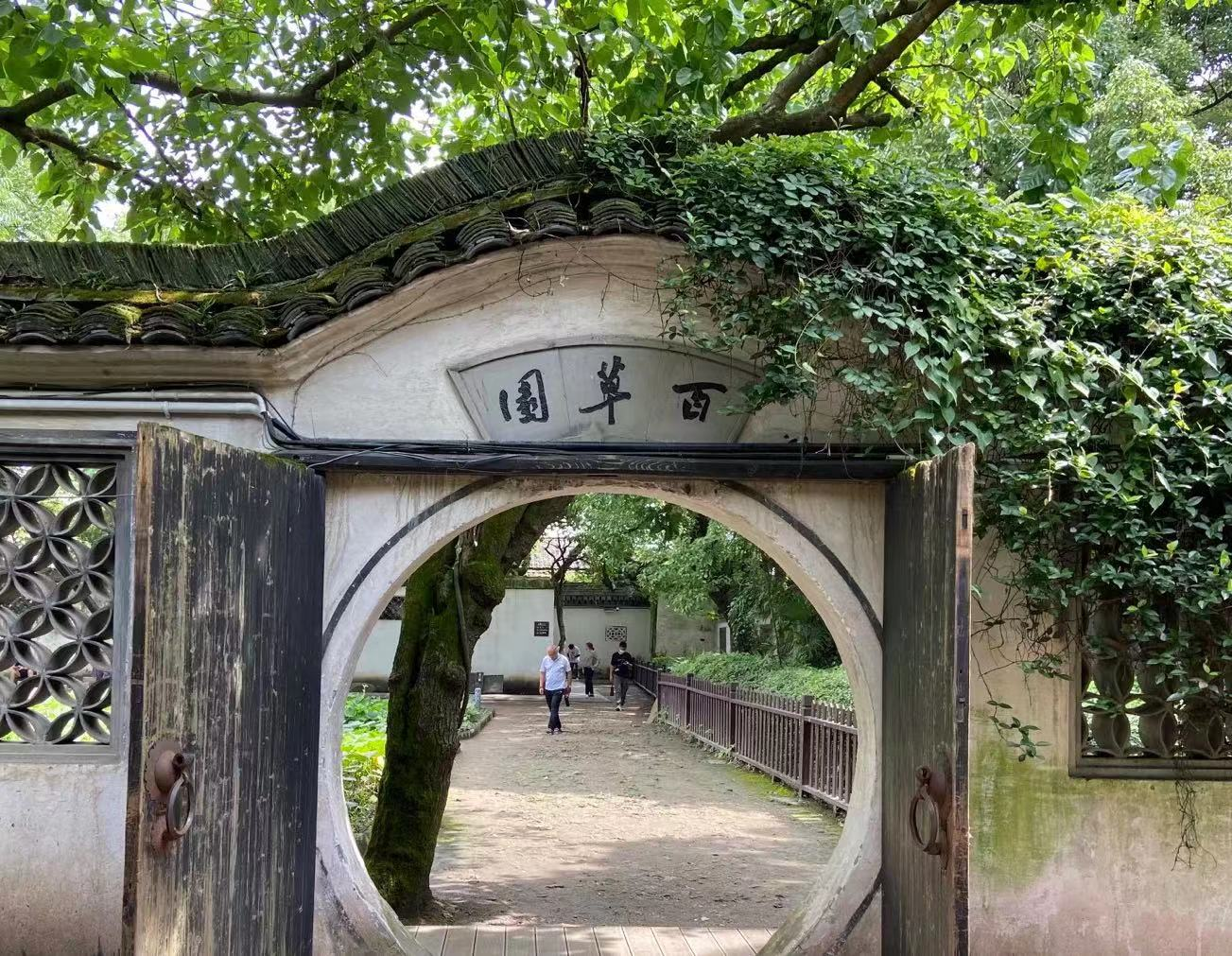
Baicao Garden

Sanwei Study Room: Sanwei Study Room was a private school in Shaoxing city, back then only rich people were allow to study in private school. Lu Xun in 'From Baicao garden to Sanwei Study room' mentioned in the front of Sanwei Study Room there was a plaque written 'Sanwei Study Room' 三味书屋. On both sides, there were several black old style chairs and tables. Lu Xun began to study here at age 12.

Lu Xun's Memorial Museum: Lu Xun memorial Hall retains the original environment where Lu Xun lived when he was alive. Inside of Lu Xun memorial Hall contains some of Lu Xun's belongings and timeline of lu Xun's life experience. The total construction area is about 5000 square meters, and the total area of Lu Xun memorial hall is about 6000 square meters.

Lu Xun's former residence: Lu Xun spent his childhood in his former residence, and it includes Baicao Garden and Sanwei Study Room. The construction built in during the reign of Emperor Jiaqing in year 1796–1820. The building is divided into three sections, consisting of a hall, a side compartment and minor rooms.

== See also ==
- Beijing Lu Xun Museum
- Former Residence of Lu Xun (Shanghai)
