= North Sichuan Road =

Road in Shanghai, China

Coordinates: 31.2581°N 121.4829°E

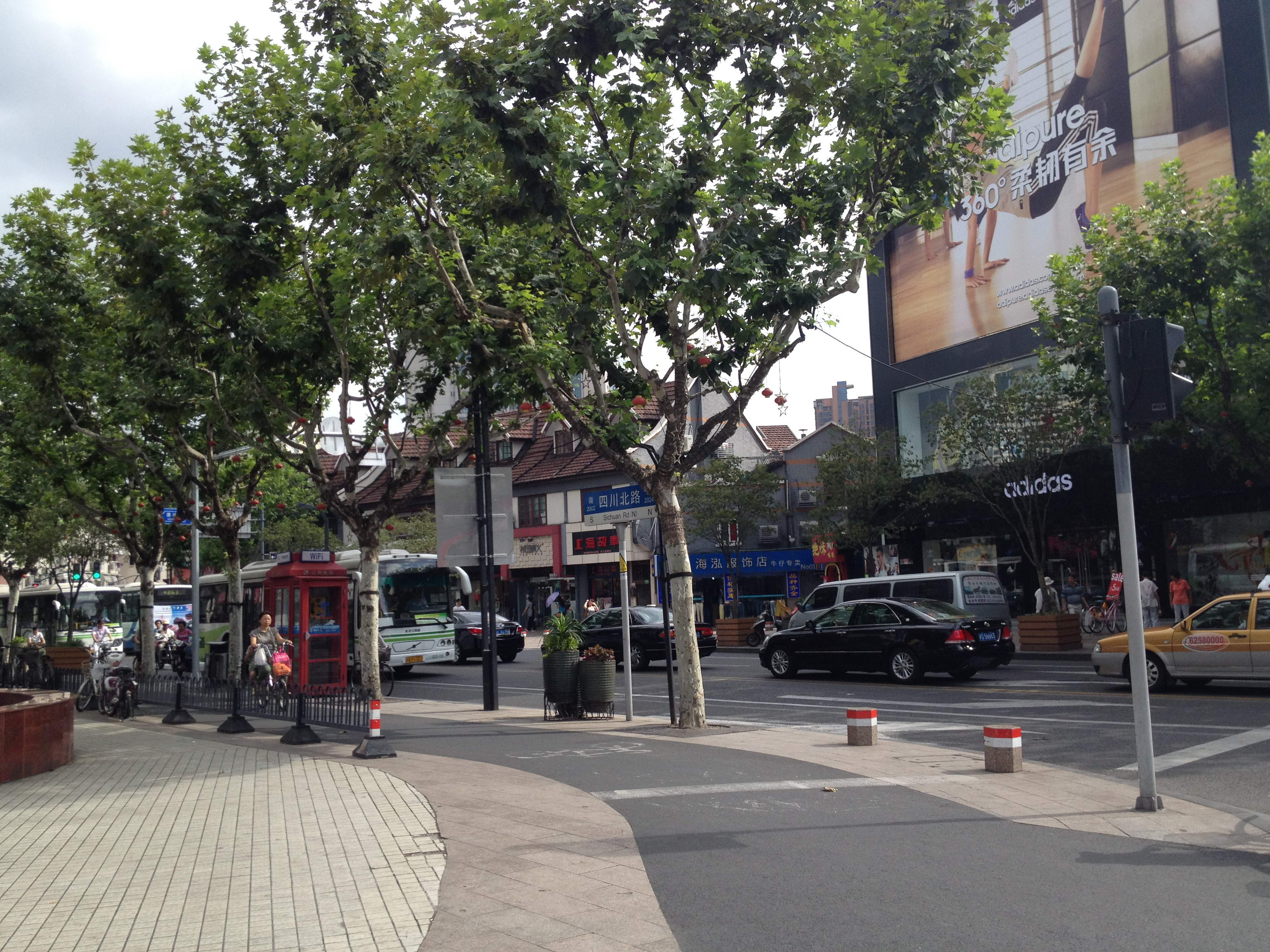
North Sichuan Road

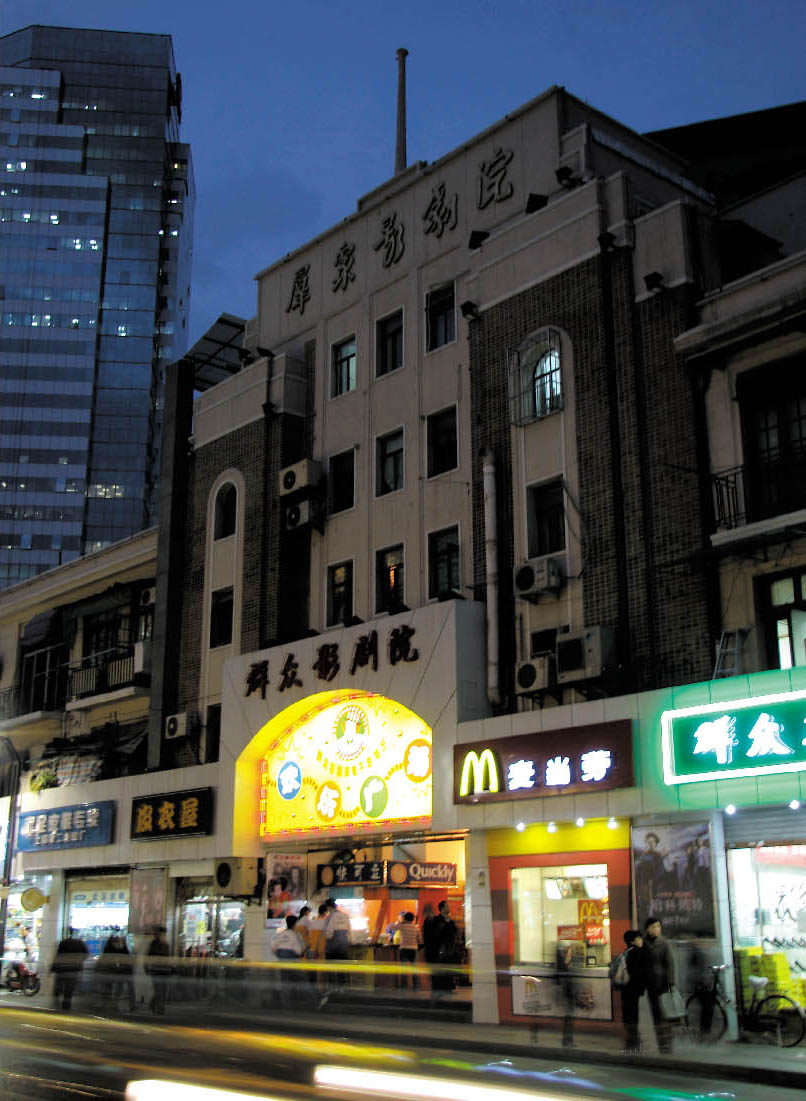
Qunzhong Theatre on North Sichuan Road

North Sichuan Road (Chinese: 四川北路; pinyin: Sìchuān Běi Lù) is a shopping street in Hongkou District, Shanghai, China. From the Suzhou Creek in the south, the road crosses North Suzhou Road, Haining Road, and Hengbang Road among others, and connects with Shanyin Road in the north, giving the road an "S" shape. It joins Duolun Road, and runs to East Jiangwan Road then turns to the west, ending at Lu Xun Park.

== History ==
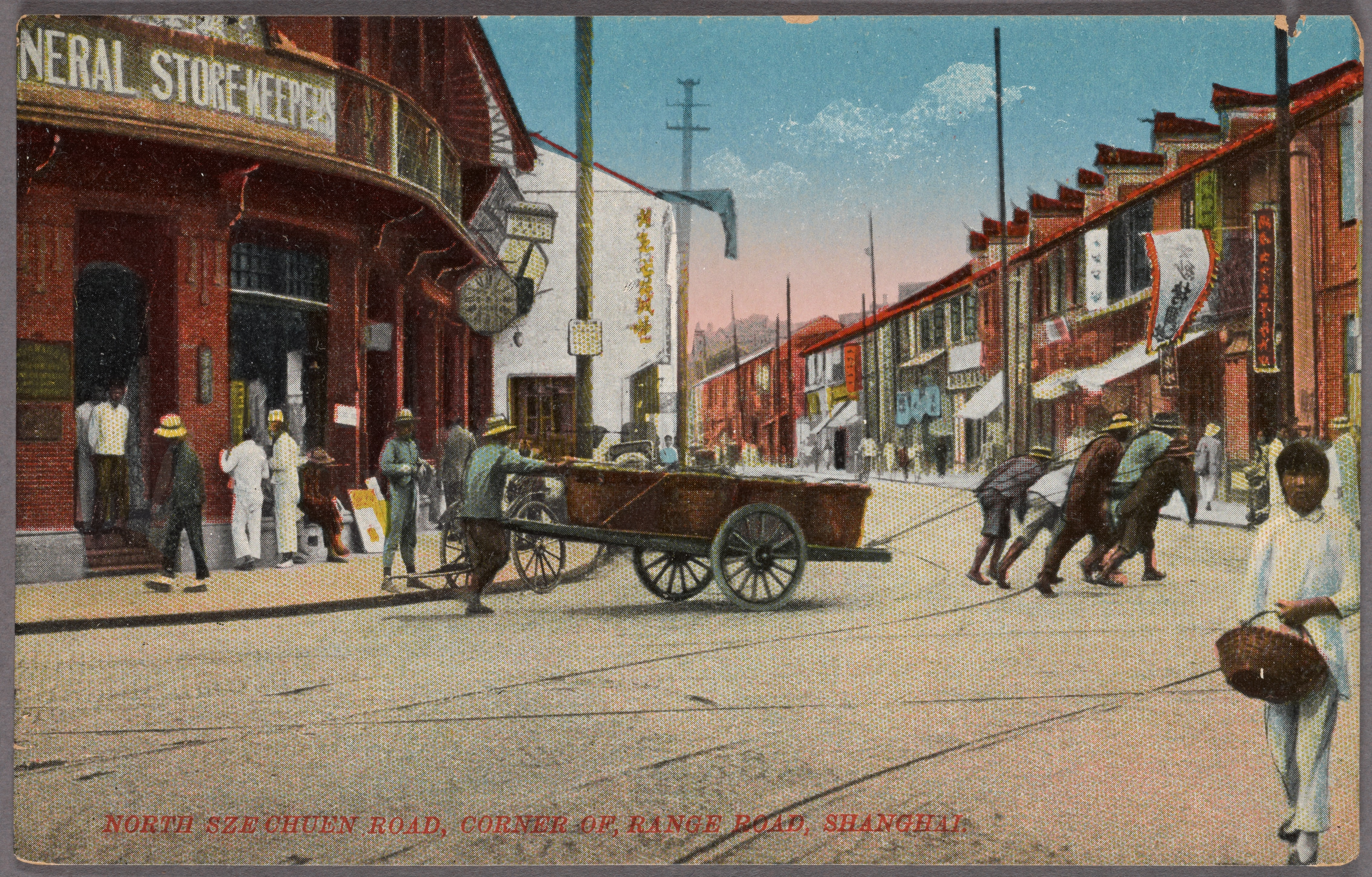
North Sze Chuen Road in 1907

Before Shanghai was settled as a port city, North Sichuan Road was only a secondary street linking Suzhou Creek and Baoshan Town (now Baoshan District). During the 1860s, there were several stores and a natural ice stadium. After the completion of the construction of the bridge over Suzhou Creek and the Woosung Railway, more and more shops and inhabitants moved to this area. In 1877, the government started to pave the street, and in the same year, Gongji Hospital (now the First People's Hospital) moved from the French Concession to this area. Later on, with the construction of the road system, it grew up gradually. Firstly, it was named as the North of the Ferry Bridge. Then because of its connection with the Sichuan Road, it was renamed as the North of the Sichuan Road.

During the 1920s, an increasing number of Japanese immigrated to this area. Many Japanese stores, restaurants, tea houses, hospitals, schools and public facilities appeared, including Goumaizuhe (now a Sichuan Chinese traditional medicine Store), Fumin Hospital (now the Fourth People's Hospital), North Japan Xunchang primary school (now a middle school attached to Education College), Neishan Hospital, and the Japan Printing store. There was also a special vegetable market for Japanese immigrants in the area. Thanks to the development of the public facilities around this area, from the 1920s, the North of the Sichuan Road became the third largest street of Shanghai after Nanjing Road and Huaihai Road.

== Events ==
When the Battle of Shanghai broke out on August 13, 1937, the area was occupied by Japanese troops. Because of severe controls imposed by the Japanese, most of the local inhabitants moved out. The stores along the North of the Sichuan Road gradually closed with only a few Japanese stores remaining open. The road went into decline during this period.

In 1945, after the Second World War, Japanese troops and immigrants moved out. More and more shops came back to this area. Stores, Fuxing Middle School, a theater and book stores reopened. A new Public Museum (now at No. 1844 North Sichuan Road) was established. In the same year, trolley cars and bus systems were resumed. On 1 January 1946, the North Sichuan Road was formally named North Sichuan Road.
