= Beijing Lu Xun Museum =

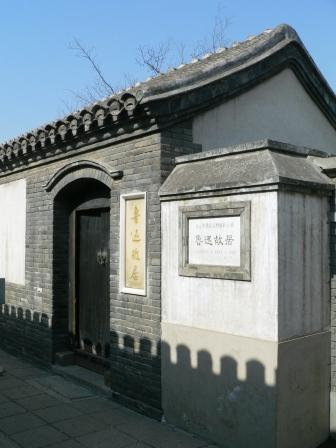
- A gate of the museum
- Established: 1956
- Location: Beijing, China
- Coordinates: 39.925808°N 116.358727°E
- Type: house museum

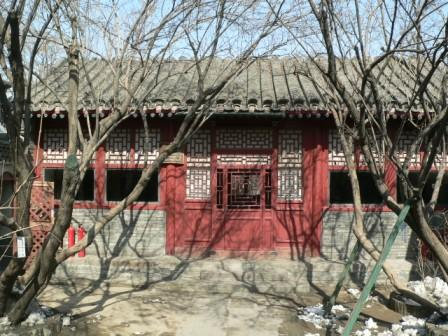
Inside the museum

The Beijing Lu Xun Museum (Chinese: 北京鲁迅博物馆) is a museum in Fucheng Gate Avenue, Beijing, China. The buildings in which the museum situated at was Lu Xun's former Beijing residence. The writer's house museum was established in 1956. The museum is dedicated to Lu Xun's life and achievements and features large quantities of scripts, photos, pictures related to Lu. In addition to materials related to Lu Xun, the museum contains a large collection of artworks.

== Books ==
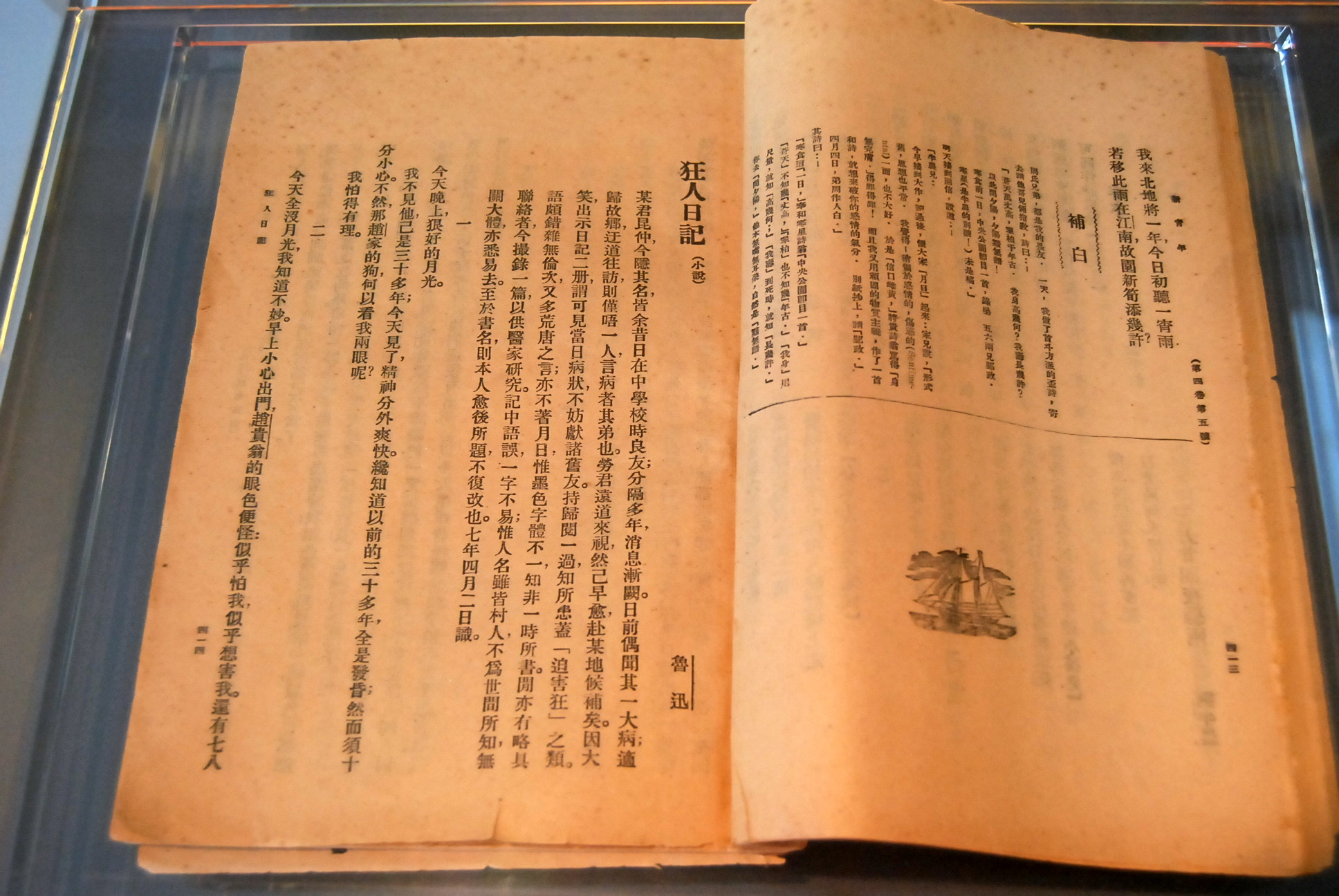

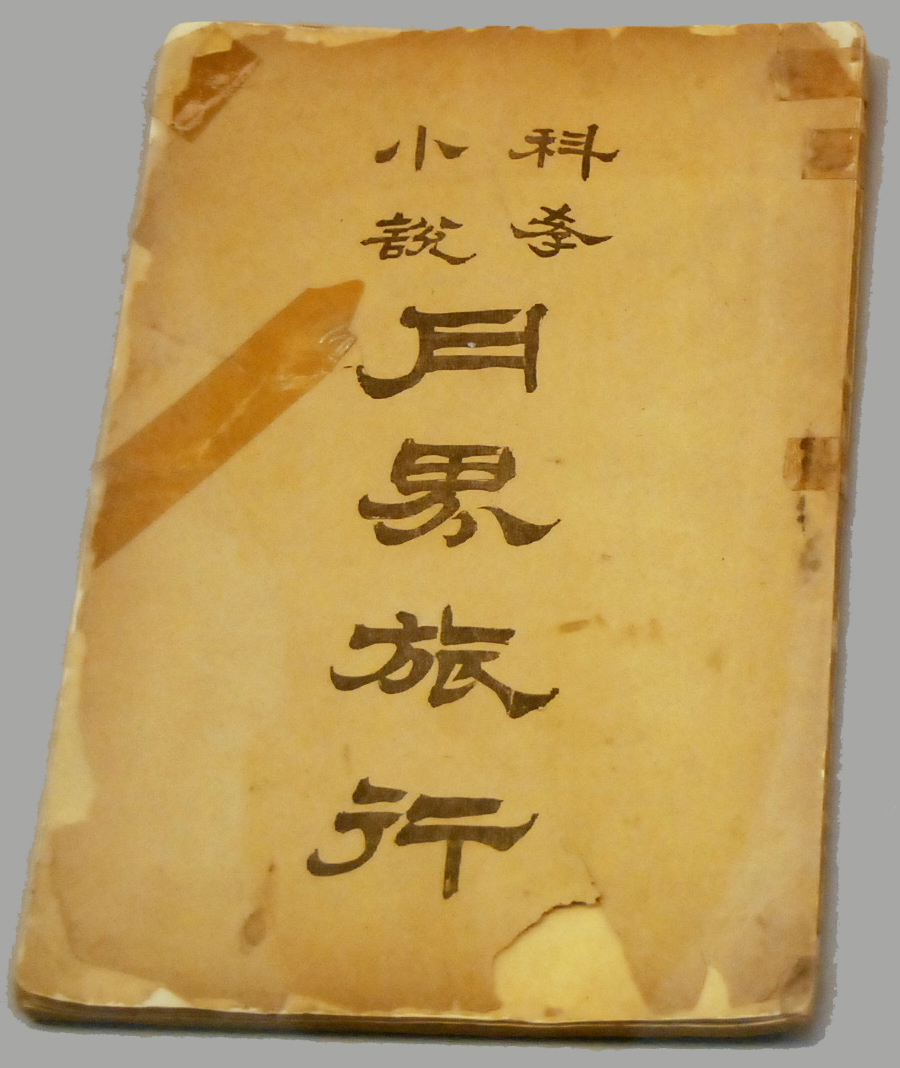

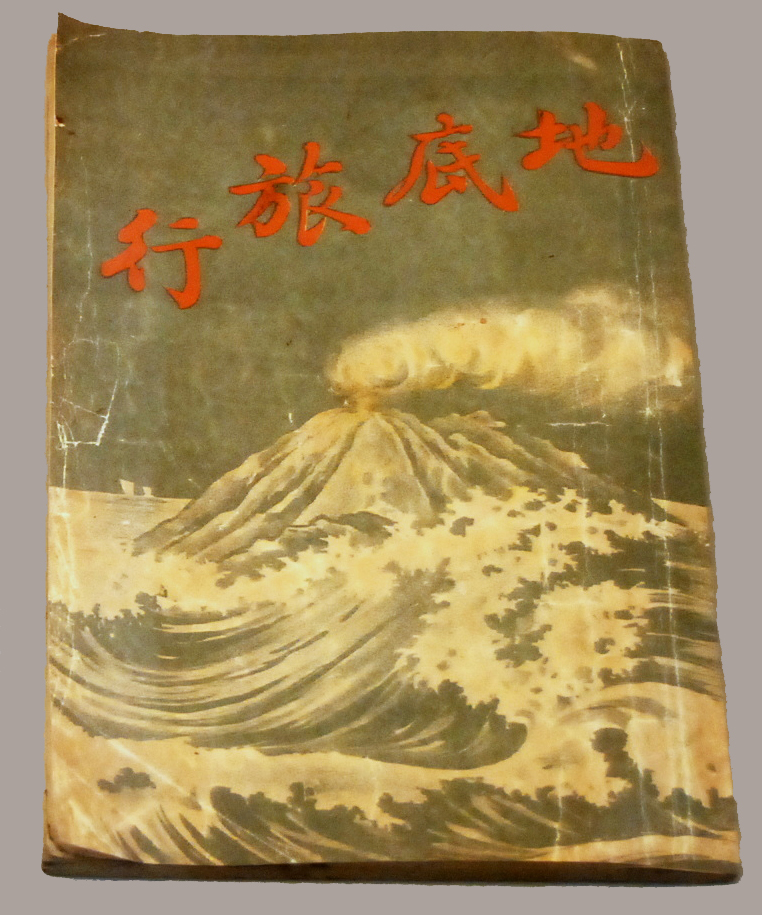

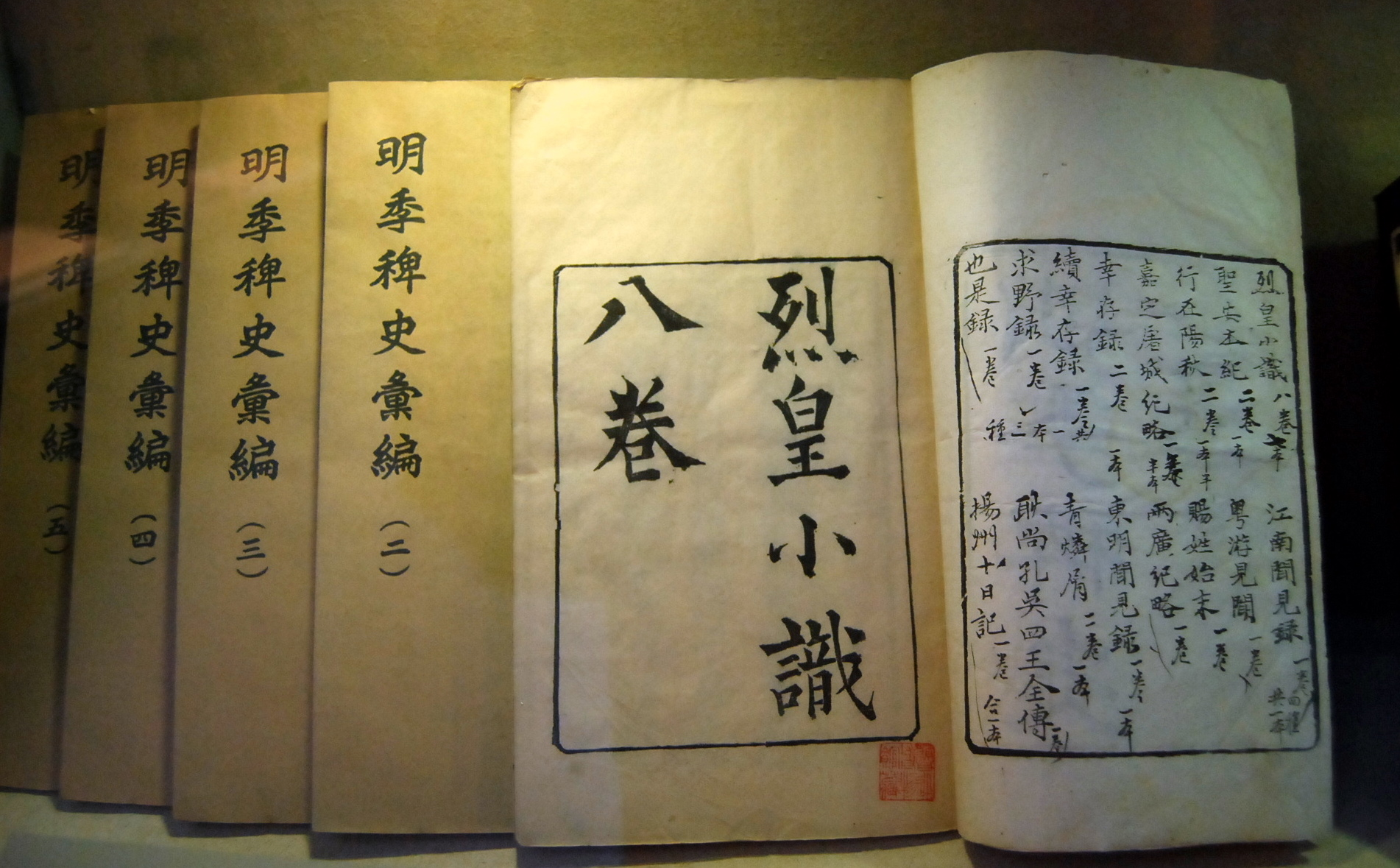

== Art ==
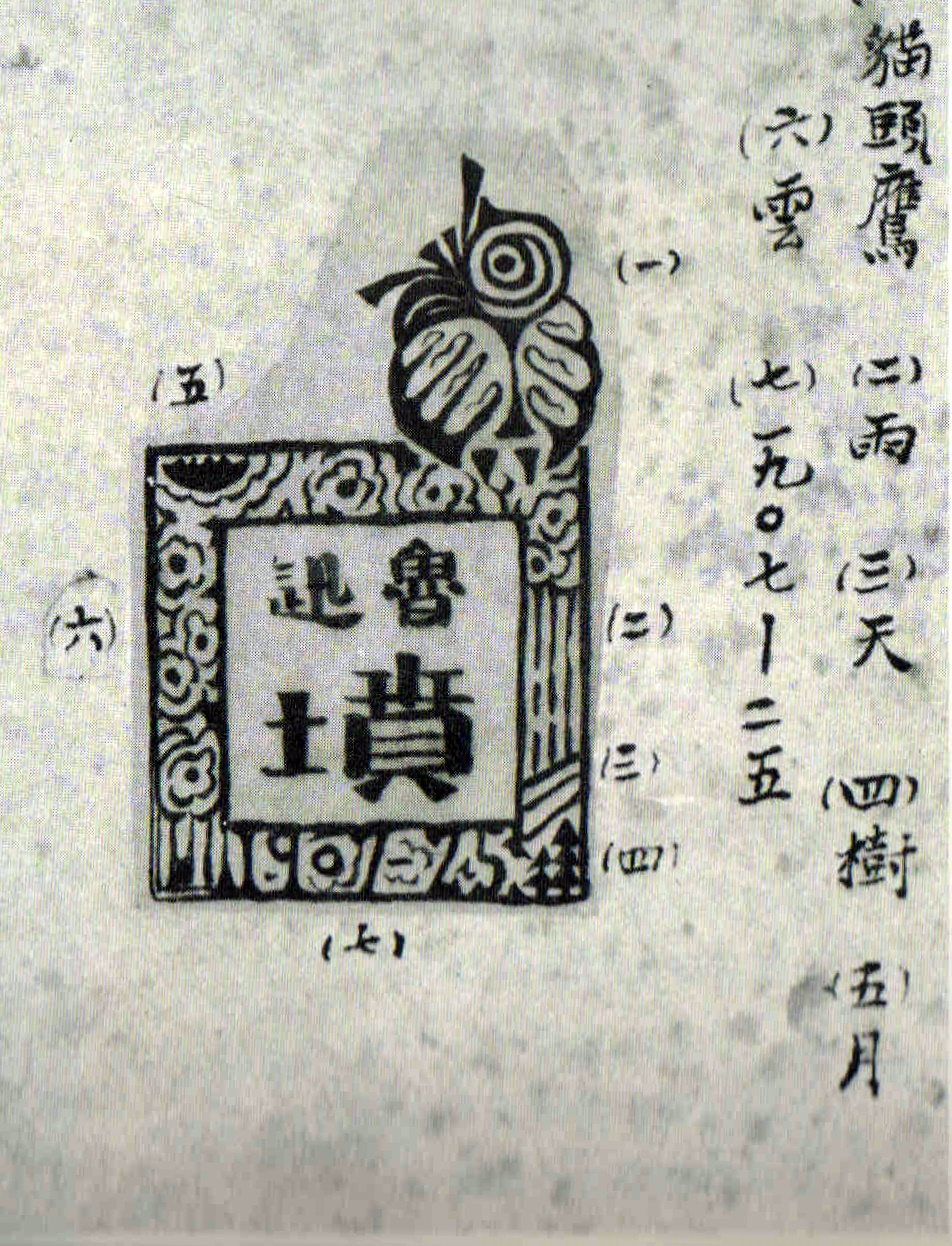
Original book cover design for Wen by Lu Xun

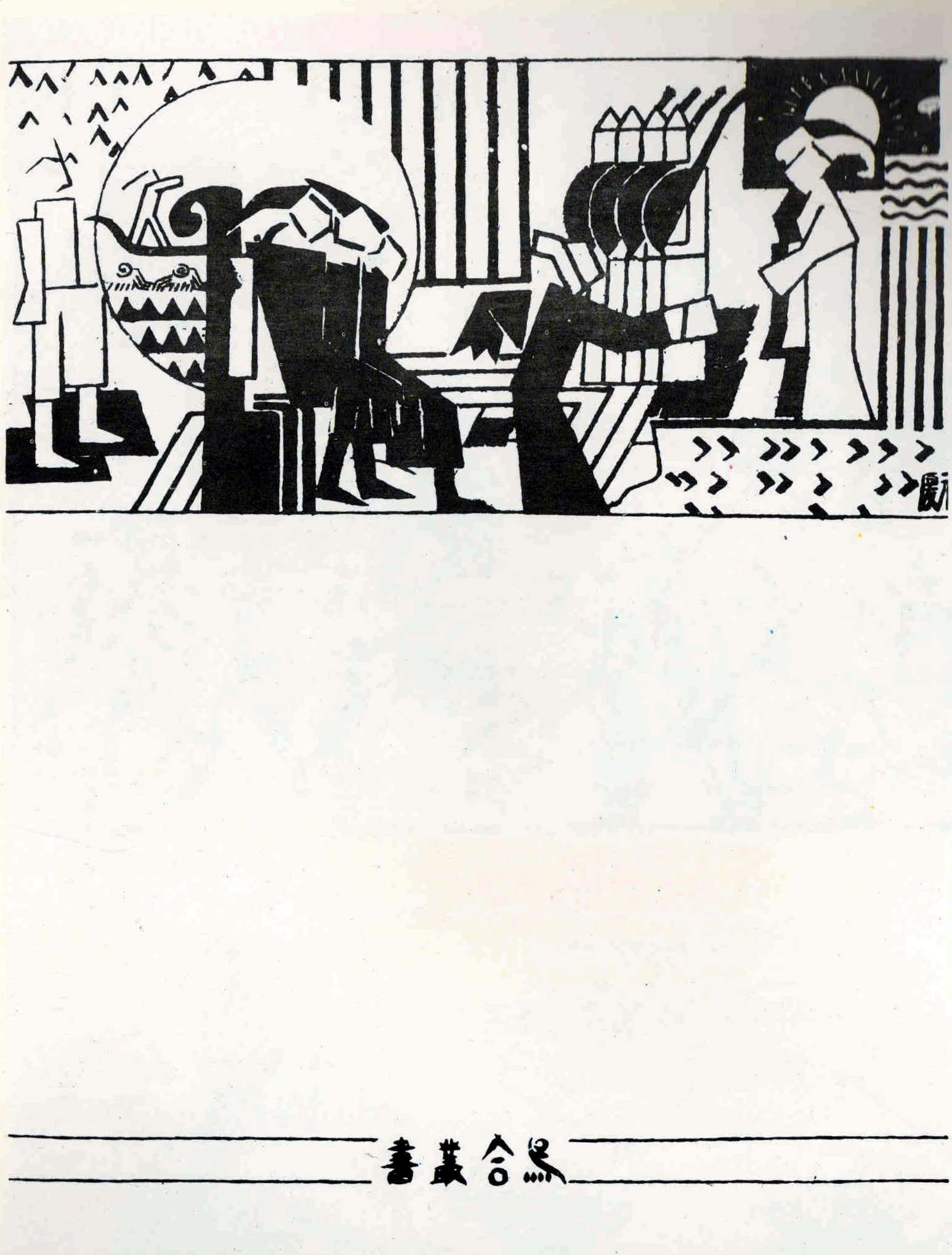
Wuhecongshu book cover by Tao Yuanqing (1893–1929)

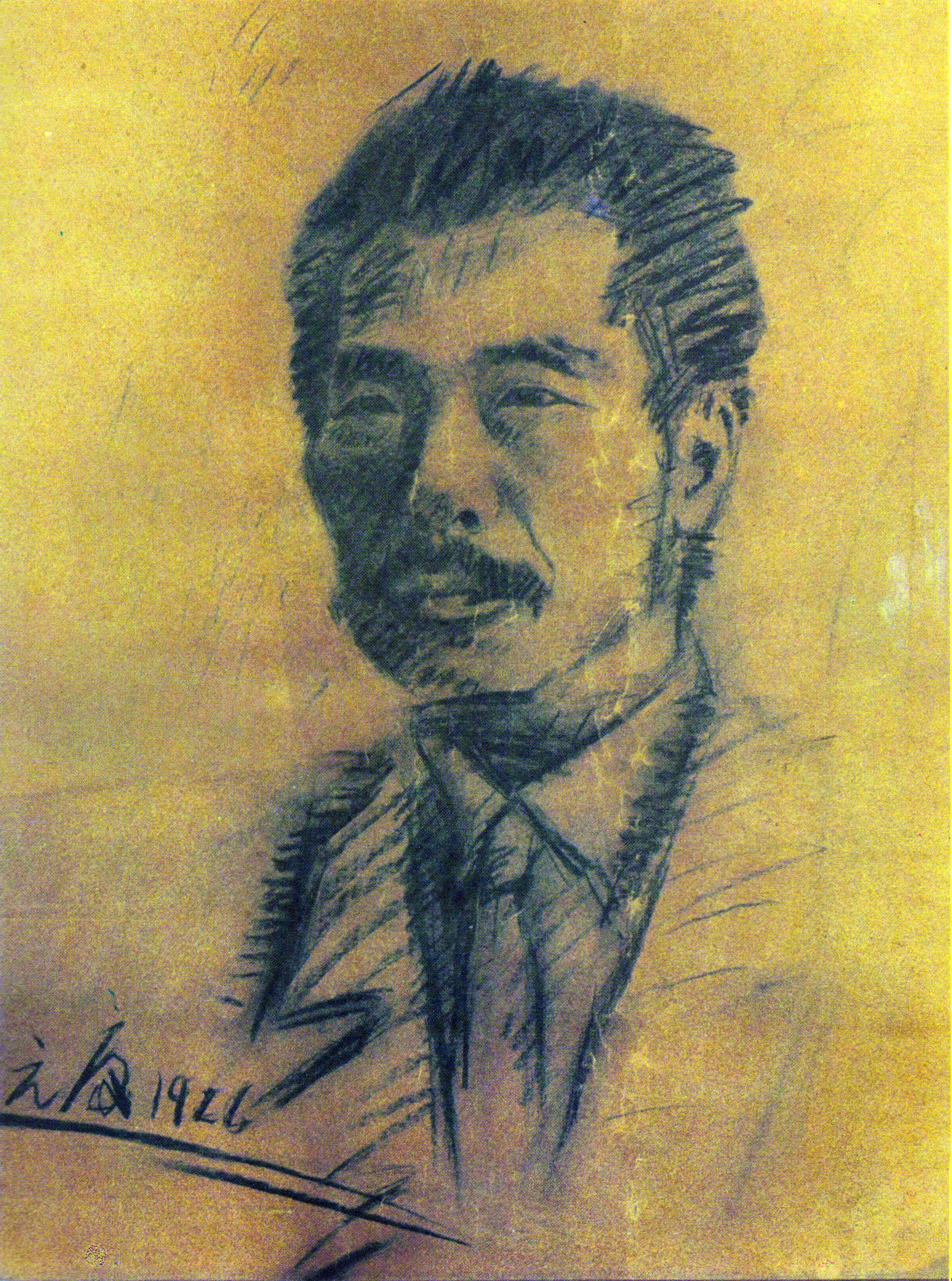
Portrait of Lu Xun by Tao Yuanqing (1893–1929)

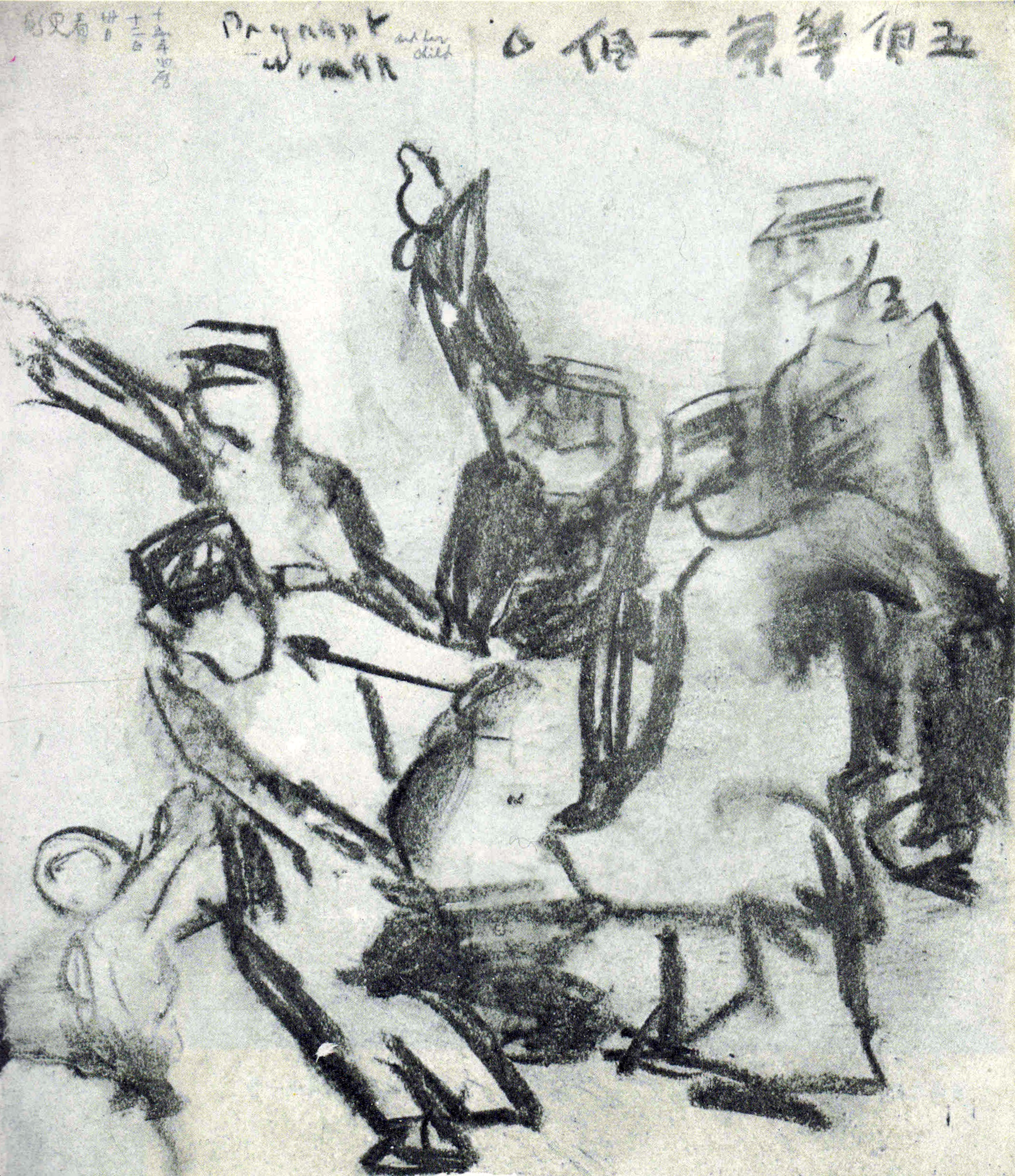
"Five Policemen and an O" by Situ Qiao (1902–1958)

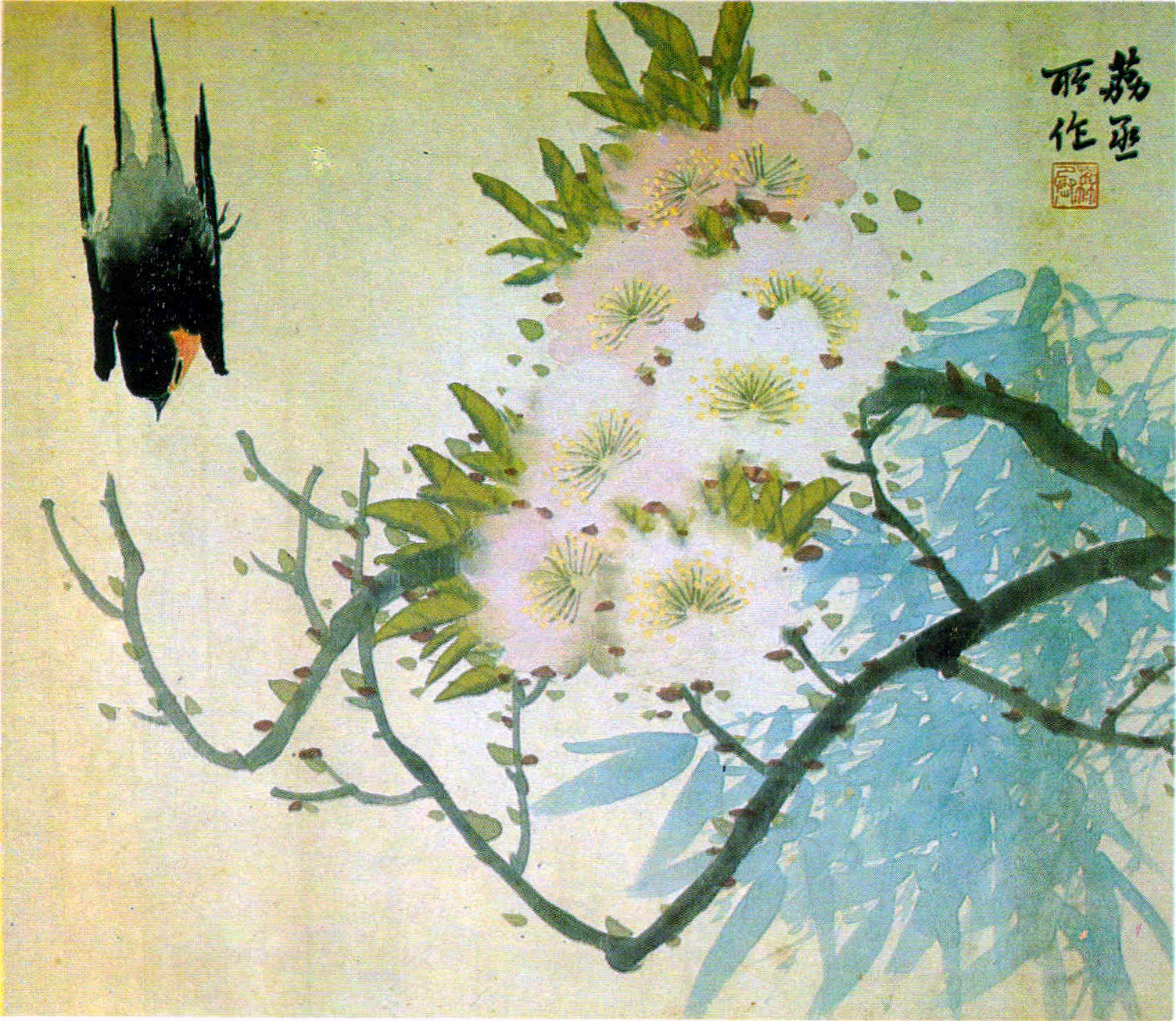
Chunya by Li Licheng (1881–1942), 1931

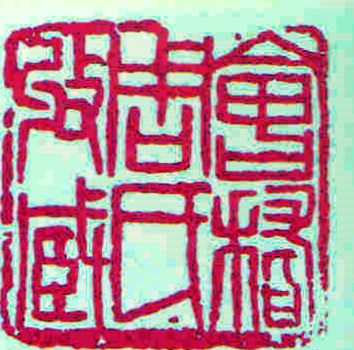
Seal by Chen Shizeng (1876–1923), 1915

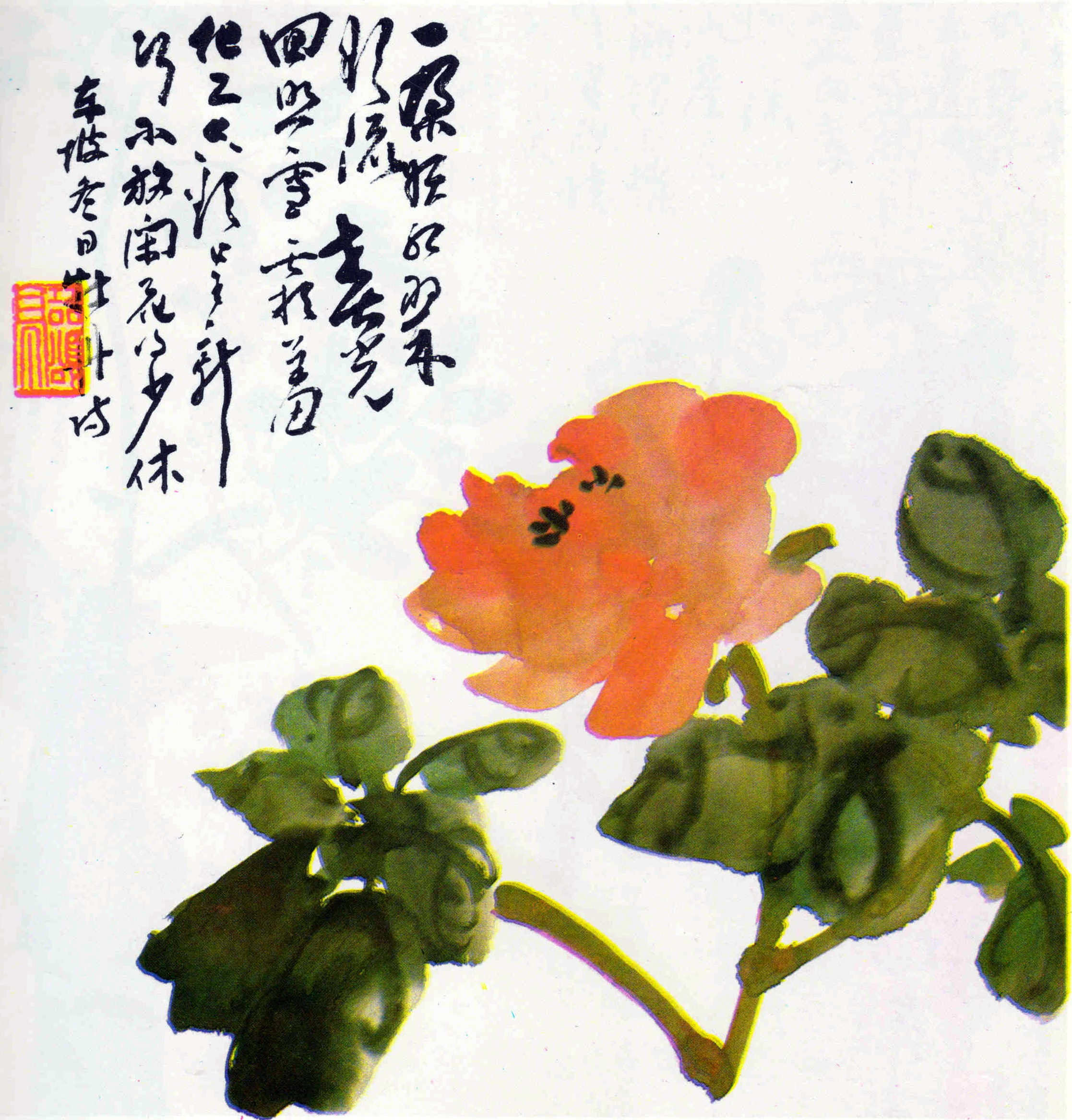
Peony by Chen Shizeng (1876–1923), 1915

== See also ==
- Former Residence of Lu Xun (Shanghai)
- Lu Xun Native Place
- List of museums in China
